= Fall Creek, Texas =

Community in Texas, US

Coordinates: 32°23′53″N 97°39′05″W

Fall Creek is a master-planned community in unincorporated Harris County, Texas, United States. The 1,300 acres (530 ha) community is 3 miles (4.8 km) away from George Bush Intercontinental Airport in Houston and 15 miles (24 km) away from Downtown Houston. Fall Creek was developed by Johnson Development and Jefferson Development.

== History ==
House sales in Fall Creek were scheduled to begin in late 2001. Fall Creek is on the former site of the El Dorado Country Club.

On February 26, 2011, construction of the main lanes between U.S. Highway 59 (Eastex Freeway) and U.S. Highway 90 (Crosby Freeway) was completed, thus completing the entire Beltway system.

== Location and property ==
The 1,260 acres (510 ha) community is on the northern side of Beltway 8, 3 miles (4.8 km) away from George Bush Intercontinental Airport in Houston and 15 miles (24 km) away from Downtown Houston. Fall Creek was developed by Johnson Development and Jefferson Development.

In 2004 Ralph Bivins of the Houston Chronicle said that Fall Creek had "one of the shortest downtown commutes among any of the master-planned communities started in the last two or three years." The development companies estimate the travel time between Fall Creek and Bush Airport to be eight minutes. Bivins said in 2001 that Fall Creek, then in development, would be closer in proximity to Downtown than Atascocita and Kingwood. The developers promoted the community's location as its selling point; Steve Pierce, the general manager of Fall Creek, described Fall Creek as "the closest master-planned community to downtown." In 2001 Bivins said that Fall Creek would be "in a strong position" because long commutes and traffic congestion became concerns to Houston area commuters. Fall Creek is in proximity to U.S. Route 59. Larry Johnson, an employee of Fall Creek co-developer Johnson Development, described U.S. 59 as "probably the best freeway in town." Pierce also said that Fall Creek was not prone to flooding. The modus operandi of the developers was that they found tracts of land near a major freeway that would put residents in a position to have quick commutes to their workplaces. Bivins compared Fall Creek to Silverlake, a community in Brazoria County developed by Johnson Development.

The development plans for Fall Creek specified that it would have about 1,500 apartment units, a hotel and conference center, office buildings, schools, and shopping centers. Redstone Golf Properties was scheduled to develop two golf courses at Fall Creek. Bivins described Fall Creek as "heavily wooded with oaks and pines."

== Education ==
Fall Creek is within the Humble Independent School District. The community is zoned to Fall Creek Elementary School, Woodcreek Middle School, and Summer Creek High School. Prior to the opening of Fall Creek Elementary, the community was served by Summerwood Elementary School. Originally the community was served by Humble High School. When Atascocita High School, scheduled to open in 2006, opened, Atascocita High began to serve Fall Creek. Atascocita stopped serving Fall Creek when Summer Creek opened.
