= Kingwood High School =

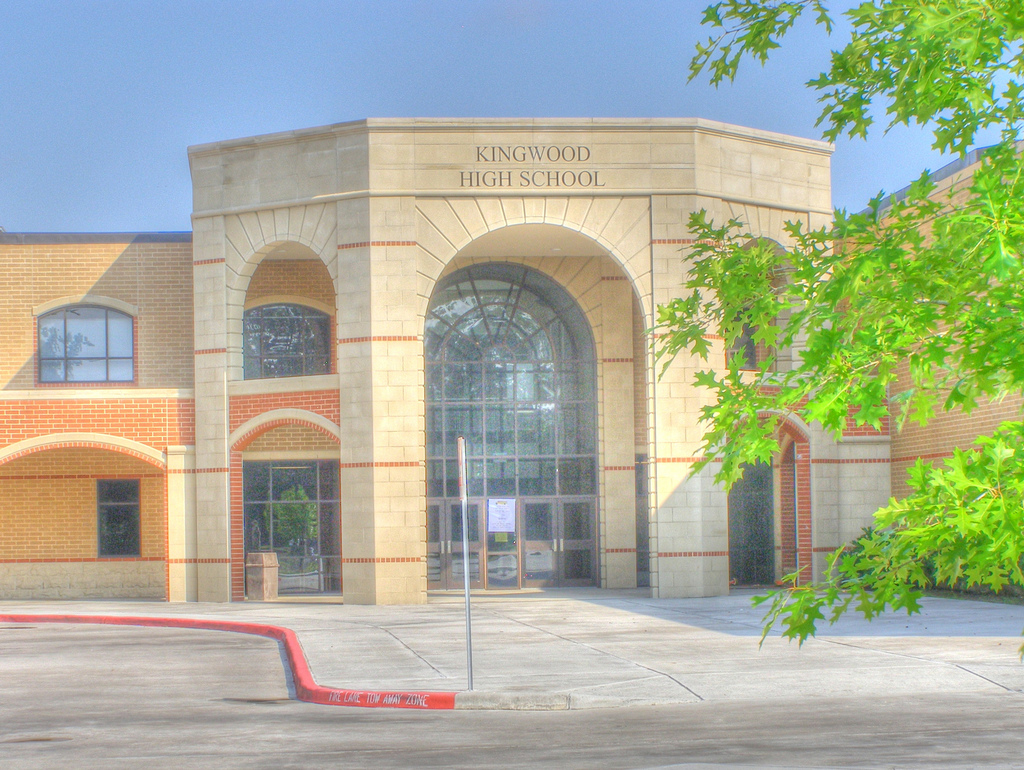

Location
- 2701 Kingwood Drive; Kingwood, Texas 77339; United States; 30.045733°N 95.193782°W

Information
- Funding type: Public
- Motto: "Learning for all...whatever it takes."
- Established: 1979
- School district: Humble Independent School District
- Principal: Meredith LeBlanc
- Teaching staff: 171.10 FTE
- Grades: 9–12
- Enrollment: 2,899 (2023-2024)
- Student to teacher ratio: 16.94
- Campus type: City: Large
- Colors: Navy blue, Columbia blue, and white
- Nickname: Mustangs
- Rivals: Atascocita High School Humble High School
- Newspaper: The Kingwood Courier
- Yearbook: Hoofprints
- Website: www.humbleisd.net/o/khs

Kingwood High School is a Humble Independent School District secondary school located in the Kingwood community of Houston, Texas, United States and serves Portions of Kingwood and Atascocita.

Kingwood was designated a National Blue Ribbon School in 1984, and it has received the Lone Star Cup five times (1999, 2001, 2003, 2004, and 2005). Its feeder schools are Creekwood Middle School, Atascocita Middle School, and Riverwood Middle School.

== History ==
Kingwood High School opened in the fall of 1979, under Principal Andy Wells. A 9th grade campus at 4015 Woodland Hills Drive opened in 1993. It was in operation until spring 2008. Kingwood was annexed into the City of Houston in 1996. Prior to 1996 both campuses were in the Kingwood census-designated place in an unincorporated area in Harris County.

Since then, the school has undergone numerous additions and renovations, including a three-year project, with a cost of $50 million, which began in 2006, and completed December 2008. Prior to fall 2007, as 9th graders attended the separate campus, combined enrollment was over 4,000, making Kingwood High School the 7th largest Texas public high school by enrollment at the time. The former 9th grade campus was renovated and is now an independent high school, called Kingwood Park High School. The first four-year class back on the main campus entered in fall 2008, and graduated in the spring of 2012.

Just before the beginning of the 2017-2018 school year, Kingwood High School was badly damaged by flooding caused by Hurricane Harvey. This meant that the students that year took their classes at Summer Creek High School.

The school reopened in March 2018 after having repairs worth upwards of $70 million.

== Academics ==
For the 2018-2019 school year, the school received an A grade from the Texas Education Agency, with an overall score of 93 out of 100. The school received a B grade in two domains, School Progress (score of 83) and Closing the Gaps (score of 89), and an A grade in Student Achievement (score of 95). The school received three of the seven possible distinction designations for Academic Achievement in Science, Academic Achievement in English Language Arts/Reading, and Academic Achievement in Social Studies.

Circa 2001 the school began using the Smaller Learning Communities program so students had assistant principals provide counseling to them.

== Student body and faculty ==
In 2006 the student population was 3,940. That year Todd Spivak of the Houston Press wrote "Most students hail from white, well-heeled families" and that "For them college is a birthright." In 2006 the number of the teaching staff exceeded 200.

== Athletics ==
The Mustangs have won 32 team state championships and 5 national championships (boys' swimming and diving: 1993, 1994, 2006 and 2020 Boys' Cross Country: 1994, 1996, 2001).

In 2006 Spivak credited the large population of the school for making the school's athletic programs strong.

State championships for the Mustangs in sports include the following:

- Boys' basketball: 2005
- Boys' baseball: 2005, 2025
- Boys' cross-country: 1988, 1993, 1994, 1995, 1996, 1997, 1998, 2001, 2002
- Boys' swimming and diving: 1993, 1994, 1995, 2002, 2006, 2007, 2009
- Boys' Track and Field: 2014
- Girls' Soccer: 1995, 1999, 2026
- Girls' Swimming and Diving: 1994, 2004, 2010, 2011
- Girls' Cross-Country: 1994, 1995, 1997, 2001, 2002, 2004, 2009, 2010
- Girls' Lacrosse: 2006, 2013
- Boys' Golf Individual - 1992
- Boys Gymnastics - 2010

== Kingwood HS Band ==
The Kingwood HS Band, or known as the Kingwood High School Mighty Mustang Military Marching Band (KM4B), is a 6A marching band that carries on the tradition of military marching throughout its fall marching season. KM4B has won several awards and granted several opportunities since its establishment in 1979, such as participating in the Rose Parade and the HEB Houston Thanksgiving Day Parade and more, with its latest being winning 3rd place at the 5A/6A Division of the 2025 Texas UIL Military Marching Band Contest.

== Notable alumni ==
- Jacqueline Anderson, actress and entrepreneur
- Scott Campbell (tattoo artist), New York-based artist
- Mindy Finn, politician
- Kyle Finnegan, professional baseball player
- Ryan Jorgensen, professional baseball player
- Todd Lowe, actor
- Josh Pastner, head basketball coach, UNLV
- Lance Pendleton, professional baseball player, formerly of the New York Yankees and the Houston Astros
- Taylor and Blake Powell, musicians
- Travis Swanson, professional football player, Miami Dolphins
- Masyn Winn, professional baseball player, St. Louis Cardinals
- Nic Wise, professional basketball player
- Dr. John Delony, author, co-host of the nationally syndicated radio program The Ramsey Show, and host The Dr. John Delony Show podcast.
