= Humble Independent School District =

School district in Texas, United States

Address
- 10203 Birchridge Drive Humble, Texas, 77338; United States

District information
- Type: Public
- Grades: PK–12
- Established: February 18, 1919; 107 years ago
- Superintendent: Dr. Roger Brown
- Governing agency: Texas Education Agency
- Schools: 52
- NCES District ID: 4823910

Students and staff
- Enrollment: 48,552 (2023–2024)
- Teachers: 3,381.40 (on an FTE basis) (2023–2024)
- Staff: 3,156.89 (on an FTE basis) (2023–2024)
- Student–teacher ratio: 14.36 (2023–2024)

Other information
- Website: www.humbleisd.net

Humble Independent School District is a school district located in Humble, Texas, United States. It serves the city of Humble, small portions of the city of Houston (including the community of Kingwood), and portions of unincorporated Harris County (including the communities of Atascocita and Fall Creek). A small section of the district extends into Montgomery County. For the 2022–2023 school year, the district enrolled 48,552 students.

Humble ISD currently has five high schools, one magnet high school, eleven middle schools, and thirty elementary schools. The district's flagship high school, Humble High School, opened in 1918. It later moved to a new building, Charles Bender High School in 1929, and eventually to its current location on Wilson Road, as Humble High School, in 1965. In 1979, Humble ISD opened Kingwood High School in the northern part of the district. Quest High School, the district's magnet high school of choice, opened in 1995 in the Community Learning Center.

In recent years, Humble ISD has become one of the fastest growing school districts in Texas. Humble High School's population grew to over 3000 students, which led to the opening of Atascocita High School in 2006. AHS was designed with smaller learning communities, in which students take their core classes in one of eight houses located at the school. After the opening of AHS, Humble and Kingwood High Schools were renovated and installed with smaller learning communities. In 2007, the district opened Kingwood Park High School at the former Kingwood ninth grade campus. Continued growth in the southern part of the district led to Humble ISD building Summer Creek High School, which opened in 2009.

In 2010, the school district was rated "recognized" by the Texas Education Agency.

== History ==
Circa 1996, prior to the City of Houston annexing Kingwood, 2,600 people lived in both the City of Houston and within Humble ISD. As of 2017 it is one of the school districts in the state with the highest growth rates.

== Schools ==
=== High schools ===
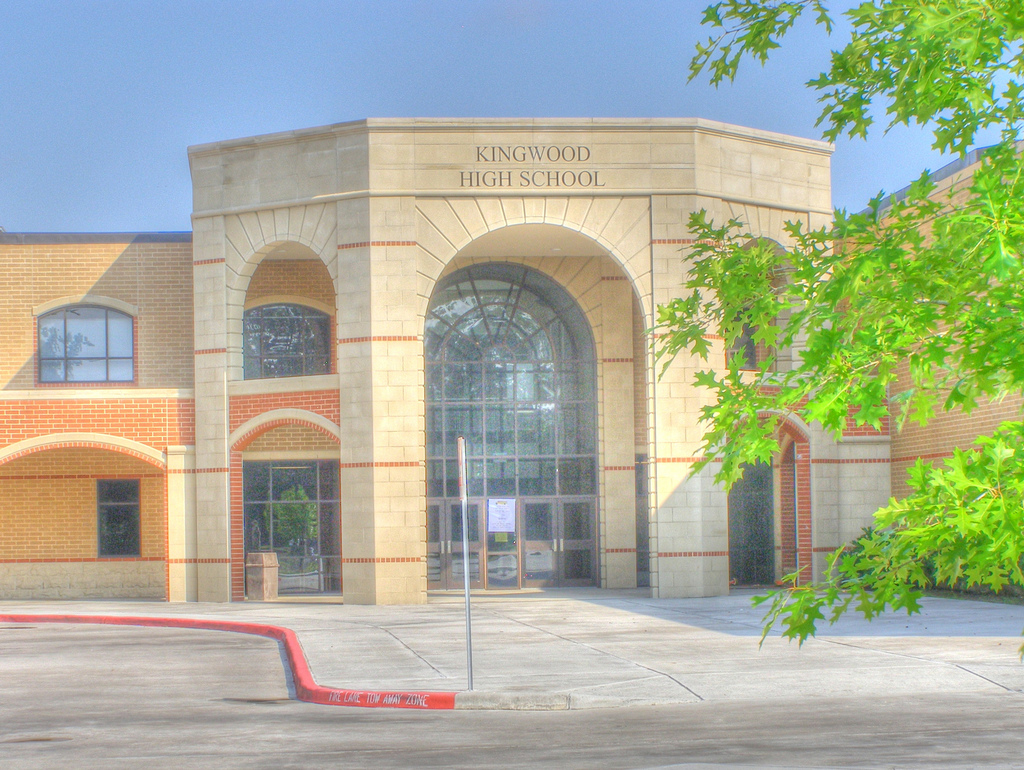
Kingwood High School

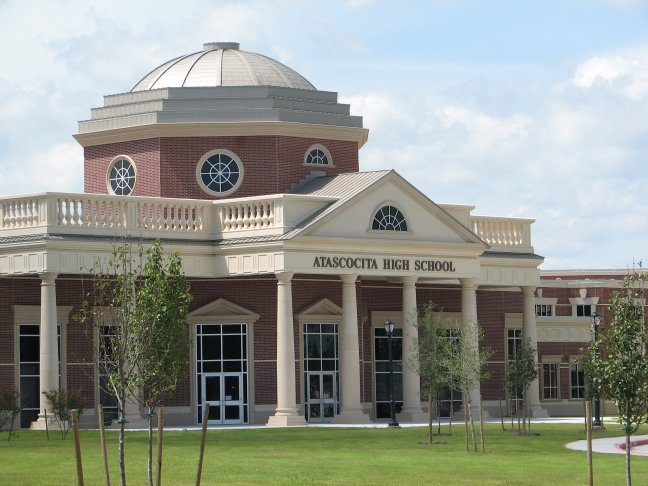
Atascocita High School

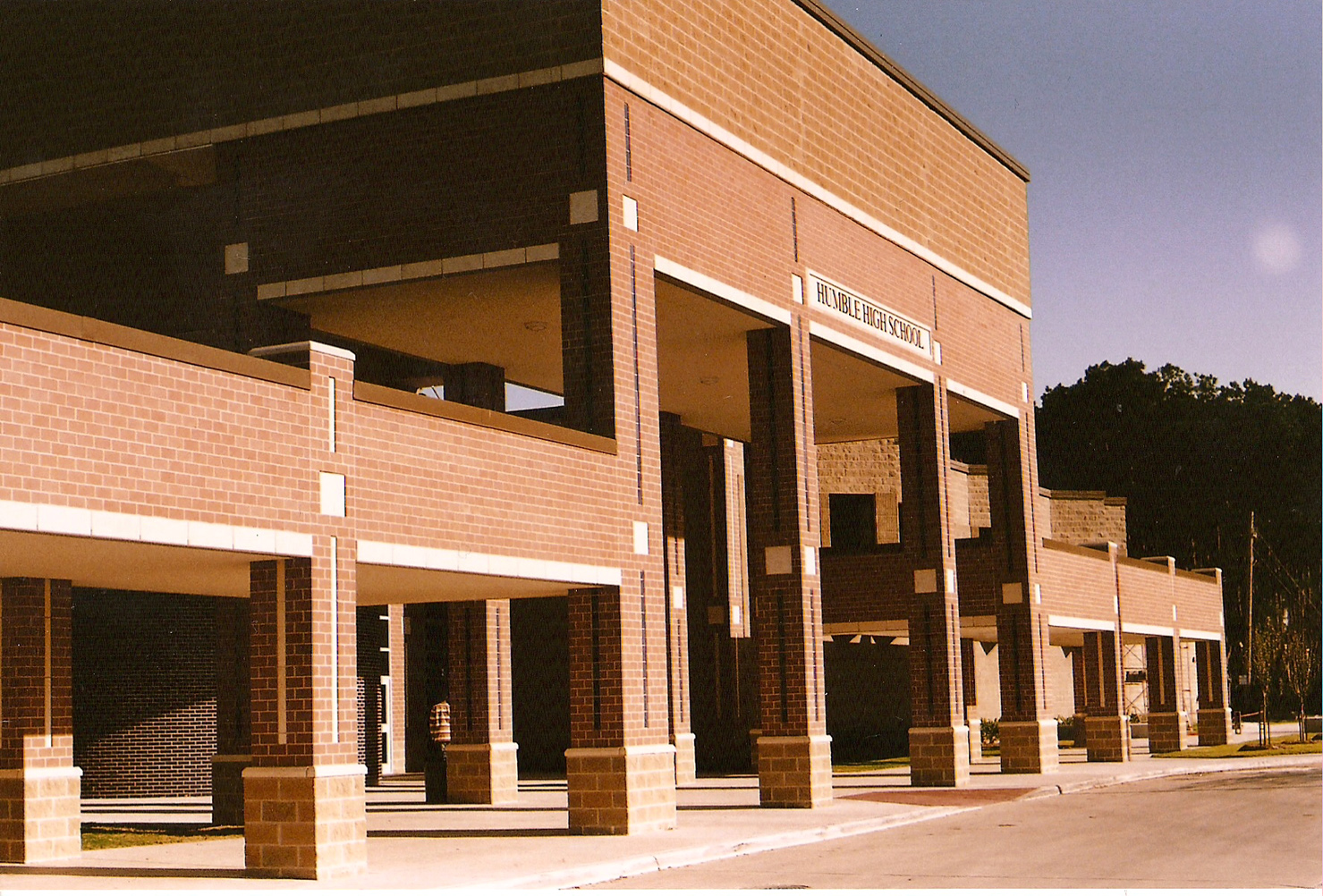
Humble High School

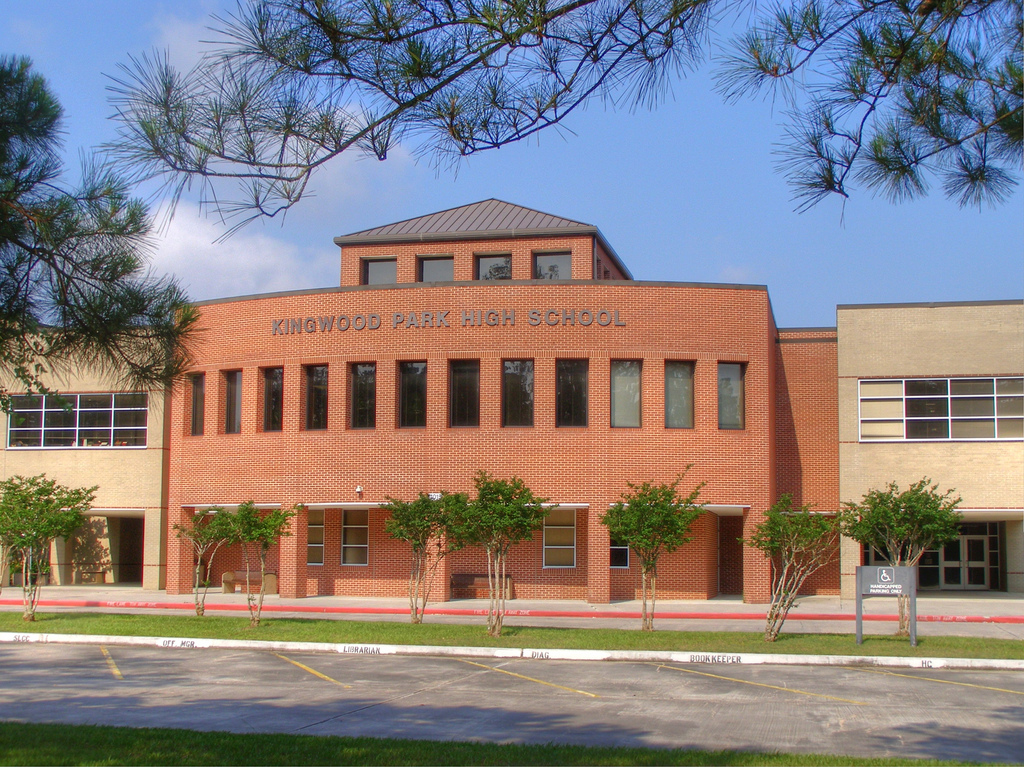
Kingwood Park High School

High schools in Humble ISD
School	Atascocita	Humble	Kingwood	Kingwood Park	Summer Creek	Sconzo Early College
Location	Atascocita (Note: Unincorporated)	Humble	Houston	Houston	Harris County	Humble
Year opened	2006	1965 (Note: Originally opened in 1918 as Humble High School; moved to a new building in 1929 as Charles Bender High School; moved to its current location and gained current name in 1965.)	1979	2007 (Note: The building had previously been a 9th grade campus for Kingwood High School.)	2009	1995
School colors	Red, white, blue	Purple, white	Navy blue, light blue, white	Forest green, silver, black	Maroon, gold	Forest green, gold
School mascot	Eagle	Wildcat	Mustang	Panther	Bulldog	Knight
Principal	Will Falker	Donna Ulrich	Michael Nasra	Lisa Drabing	Brent McDonald	Nachelle Williams
University Interscholastic League classification	6A	6A	6A	5A	6A	N/A
Enrollment	3,621	2,960	2,725	1,643	2,019	393

=== Middle schools ===
- Atascocita
- Creekwood
- Humble
- Kingwood
- Riverwood
- Ross Sterling
- Timberwood
- West Lake
- Woodcreek
- Autumn Ridge
- Lake Houston

=== Elementary schools ===
==== Feeders of Atascocita MS ====
- Maplebrook Elementary School (Atascocita)
- Pine Forest Elementary School (Atascocita, unincorporated area)
- Timbers Elementary School (Atascocita, unincorporated area)
- Fall Creek, Lakeshore and Summerwood elementary schools fed into Atascocita MS before the opening of Woodcreek MS

==== Feeders of Creekwood MS ====
- Bear Branch Elementary School (Houston)
- Greentree Elementary School (Houston)
- Hidden Hollow Elementary School (Houston)
- Pine Forest Elementary School (Kings River sections 9-10 only)

==== Feeders of Humble MS ====
- North Belt Elementary School (Humble, unincorporated area)
- Park Lakes Elementary School (Atascocita, unincorporated area)
- Whispering Pines Elementary School (Atascocita, unincorporated area)

==== Feeders of Kingwood MS ====
- Bear Branch Elementary School (partial)
- Elm Grove Elementary School (Houston)
- Foster Elementary School (Houston)
- Woodland Hills Elementary School (Houston)

==== Feeders of Riverwood Middle School ====
- Deerwood Elementary School (Houston)
- Shadow Forest Elementary School (Houston)
- Willow Creek Elementary School (Houston)

==== Feeders of Ross Sterling MS ====
- Humble Elementary School (Humble)
- Jack M. Fields Sr. Elementary School (Humble)
- Lakeland Elementary School (Humble)
- River Pines Elementary School (Atascocita, unincorporated area)

==== Feeders of Timberwood MS ====
- Atascocita Springs Elementary School (Humble, opening August 2010) (Note: Constructed to LEED and Collaborative for High Performance Schools standards)
- Eagle Springs Elementary School (Atascocita, opened in 2005)
- Oak Forest Elementary School (Atascocita, unincorporated area)
- Oaks Elementary School (Atascocita, unincorporated area)

==== Feeders of Woodcreek MS ====
- Fall Creek Elementary School
- Lakeshore Elementary School (Houston, opened August 2009)
- Ridge Creek Elementary School
- Summerwood Elementary School (Atascocita, unincorporated area)

==== Feeders Of West Lake MS ====
- Atascocita Springs Elementary (Atascocita, unincorporated)
- Lakeshore Elementary (Houston, opened in 2009)
- Groves Elementary (Atascocita, unincorporated)

==== Feeders Of Autumn Ridge MS ====
- Ridge Creek Elementary
- Centennial Elementary
- Autumn Creek Elementary
- Park Lakes Elementary
