= K-Park =

K-Park may refer to:

- Kingwood Park High School, educational facility in Houston, Texas, USA
- K-Park Training Academy, association football venue in East Kilbride, Scotland
