= Forest Cove =

Forest Cove can refer to a place in the United States:

- A section of Kingwood, Houston, Texas
