= The Powell Brothers =

Country music artist from Texas, US

The Powell Brothers is a country music recording artist from Kingwood, Texas. The group was formed by brothers Taylor and Blake Powell in February 2014.

== Background ==
Blake and Taylor Powell are both multi-instrumentalists. They first toured together in 2006 as a hired backing musicians, and continued to play as such until Blake graduated from Kingwood High School in 2007, and Taylor in 2010. Post-graduation, both of the brothers briefly attended Berklee College of Music. In their individual careers, the brothers have worked as songwriters, producers, band members, music directors, and session players for more than 30 artists internationally, including: Drew Cline, Grace Pettis, Granger Smith, Haley Cole, Jon Wolfe, Sam Riggs and the Night People, Tucker Jameson, Shane Smith And The Saints, and Will Makar. In February 2014 they were both on the verge of pursuing separate careers on opposite sides of the United States, but instead, decided to form The Powell Brothers and focus on making their own music.

In June 2016, Chad W. Tolar, Esq. joined the team and was named a partner in Powell Brothers Productions, along with Taylor Powell and Blake Powell. The three partners also made Tolar Powell Entertainment, LLC, a booking and management company based in McAllen, Texas.

The group has shared the stage with Country musicians like Brothers Osborne, Billy Currington, Jon Pardi, Lee Brice, Cody Johnson, Josh Turner, Gary Allan, Granger Smith, Carly Pearce, Parker McCollum, The Cadillac Three and more. The Powell Brothers are a national touring act performing on average 160 dates across 25 states every year. The band performs at events in the United States including the 2019 World Series at Minute Maid Park in Houston, Texas, the Dallas Cowboys 2021 season home opener on Monday Night Football at AT&T Stadium in Arlington, Texas, the 2021 National Finals Rodeo at the Las Vegas Convention Center, the 2022 Houston Livestock Show & Rodeo at NRG Stadium in Houston, Texas and more.

== Members ==
- Taylor Powell (Lead Vocals, Guitar & Bass)
- Blake Powell (Guitar, Bass & Backing Vocals)

== Discography ==
Year	Album
2014	The Powell Brothers (Acoustic EP)
2014	"No More" (Single)
2015	RCA Studio A - Day One (Live EP)
2016	Four Wheel Hotel (Single)
2017	Introducing... The Powell Brothers (EP)
2017	Evangeline (Single)
2018	Coming Home (Single)
2018	Somewhere Down The Road (Single)
2019	Leave on the Light (Album)
2019	The Way You Are (Single)
2020	How It's Done (Single)
2021	Twenty Twenty (EP)
2021	Hopeless (Single)
2021	Blinding Lights (Single)
2022	Buy A Ticket (Single)
2022	Better Now (Single)
2023	Be Somebody (Single)
2024	What Took You So Long (Single)
