= Christian Life Center Academy =

Private school in Kingwood, Texas, United States

Location
- 806 Russell Palmer Rd. Kingwood, Texas 77339; United States; 30.0660993°N 95.22514319999999°W

Information
- Type: Private, Coeducational
- Religious affiliation: Christian
- Established: 1992
- Grades: K-12
- Enrollment: 400
- Colors: Maroon and White
- Nickname: Cougars
- Website: clc-church.com/pages/school

Christian Life Center Academy (CLCA) is a private, college preparatory Christian school serving primary, secondary and postgraduate students located in the Kingwood area of Houston. It was previously in another section of the city of Houston, near Humble.

CLCA serves approximately 150 students from Daycare – 12th Grade and is a self-supporting agency of the Christian Life Center Church.

== History ==
In 1992, Christian Life Center Academy opened its doors to 25 students. Notable alumni include Ben McLemore of the Sacramento Kings, DeAndre Jordan of the L.A. Clippers, and Latavious Williams of Bilbao Basket. Christian Life Center is part of Christian Life Center church. In addition to the church ministry, Christian Life Center also has a coffee shop, book store, day care center and a Christian school with nearly 400 children in the Kingwood area.

== Notable alumni ==
- Junior Cadougan (born 1990), professional basketball player
- DeAndre Jordan, NBA player
- Michale Kyser (born 1991), basketball player for Hapoel Holon in the Israeli Basketball Premier League
- Ben McLemore, NBA player
- Augustine Rubit (born 1989), basketball player in the Israeli Basketball Premier League
- Latavious Williams (born 1989), NBA player
