= Charles Bender High School =

High school in Humble, Texas

Coordinates: 29.9976°N 95.2603°W

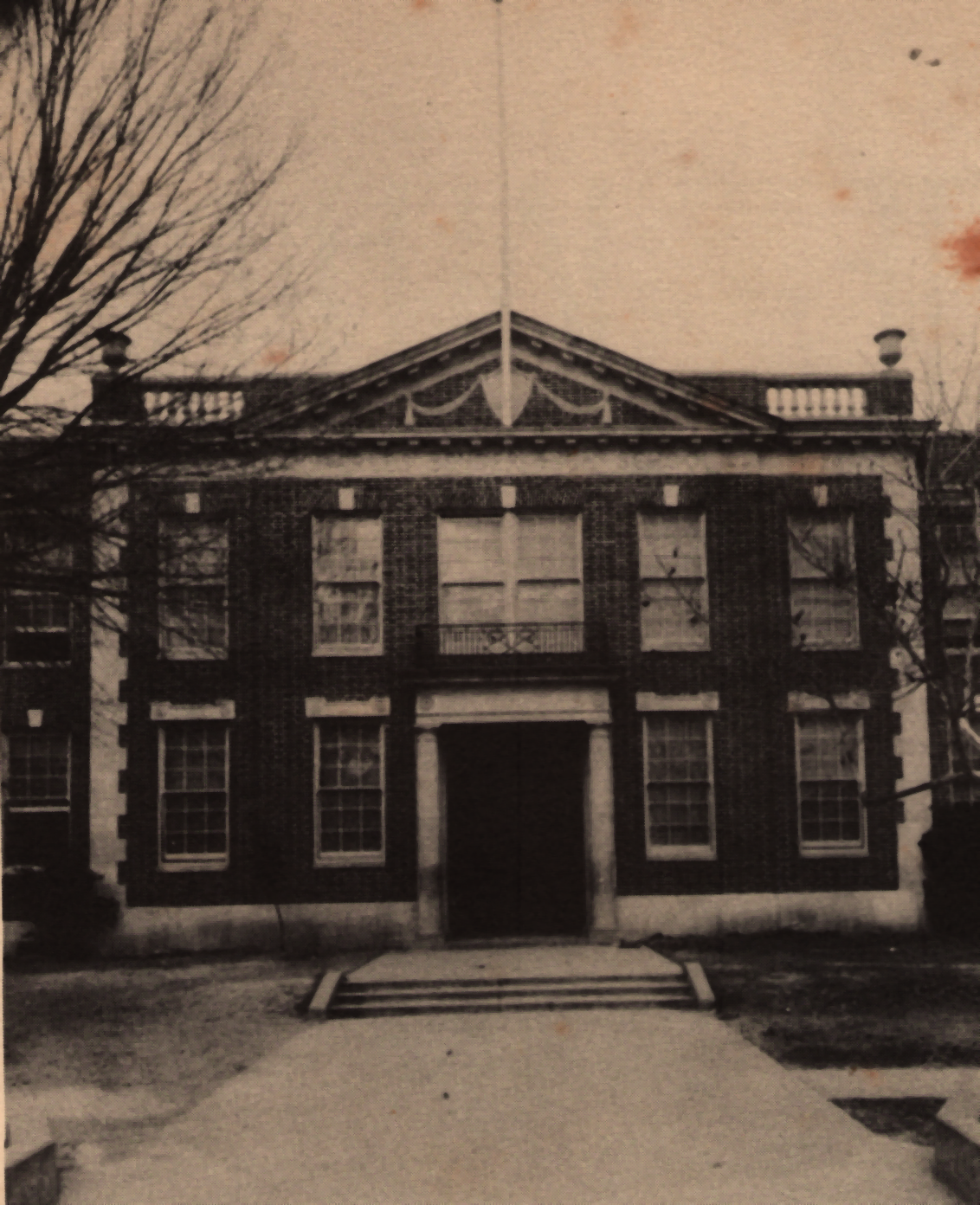

Information
- Established: 1930
- Closed: 1965

Charles Bender High School was the second high school built in Humble, Texas and the third school there to provide high school seniors with diplomas.

== History ==
The first school with high school graduates was the Humble School, which served all grades (1-11). The first students to graduate were the Inmann twins, Edith and Ethel, who graduated in 1911. Starting in 1918, students graduated from Humble High School on Higgins Street, built next door to the Humble School. When Humble High School opened, the Humble School was renamed to the Humble Grammar School. The Humble Grammar School was destroyed in a pre-dawn fire on January 26, 1929. The land occupied by the Humble Grammar School, Block 26 in Bender's First Addition was donated by the estate of Charles Bender in 1909.

After the destruction of the Humble Grammar School, the school board voted to have a new building constructed. After H. E. McKay and 53 other citizens submitted a formal petition, the school board voted to hold a bond election to fund a new junior-senior high school building of $140,000 on February 12, 1929. The bond election was held on March 12, 1929 and passed with 312 citizens voting for the bond and 36 against it.

The board had been conferring with architects; it was of a unanimous opinion that Robert E. Lee High School at Goose Creek, reduced to size, was about what was needed for Humble, and that the architect Harry D. Payne would meet with the board.

On March 28, 1929, the school board voted to name the new school Charles Bender High School in honor of the Bender family for donations and loyal support. At the same meeting, Payne presented preliminary plans for the new high school at standard scale. The plans were approved with few changes. On April 15, 1929, the children of Charles Bender send a letter to the school board thanking them for honoring their father.

A lengthy battled ensued between citizens and the school board over the location of the new school. Several citizens wanted the new school on grounds with much more land, to provide the students more opportunities. The school board eventually decided to build the school on the site of the destroyed Humble Grammar School.

On May 13, 1929, the school board accepted the drawings and specifications for Charles Bender High School by architect Harry D. Payne, along with plans for remodeling Humble High School into use as a grammar school. On June 5, 1929, the school board approved contracts for the construction of the school: C. W. Ennis was awarded te general contract for $124,350; Walker Heating and Plumbing was awarded the contract for $16,755 (plus $19,50 for work on the Humble High School renovation), Caywood Electric was awarded a contract of $6,200, and Harry D. Payne was paid architect fees of $7,492.75

A ceremony for the laying of the cornerstone was held on Saturday, September 29, 1929 at 4 PM.

On December 6, 1929, Payne offered his fee as 3% for coordinating contract, instead of the agreed upon 5%, to allow better purchase of equipment for the school. On January 4, 1930 the Bender family donated $3,025 to furnish the stage scenery for the high school.

On February 5, 1930, the school board accepted possession of Charles Bender High School (dependent on final inspection). The building encompassed 31,376 square feet (2,914.9 m^{2}) and contained 20 classrooms. The school board eventually paid Payne his full 5% commission.

Even though the school was named Charles Bender High School, it was frequently referred to as the Humble High School, since it was the only one in the town.

In 1955, the old Humble High School building, which occupied the adjoining lot, was torn down to make way for additions to Bender High School. In early 1956, a new cafeteria, band room, and gymnasium were added.

In 1959, grades 8-12 attended Bender High School.

In 1965, a new school opened in the district — Humble High School on Wilson Road. Charles Bender High School was converted to a junior high, which received students from Humble Elementary and Lakeland Elementary.

In 1973, the building was converted for use as the district administration center. The renovation was completed in January 1974.

== Status ==
The building was later modified and used as the Curriculum and Staff Development Center. In 2003, after the opening of the Instructional Support Center in Kingwood, the former Charles Bender High School building was abandoned and has been vacant ever since. The building has been in disrepair and suffers from problems with asbestos. Over the years, many former students and community members have rallied around preserving the building.

Humble High graduate and teacher at Atascocita High School, Gaby Diaz and her students led a charge to preserve the building. They built a website (www.impossibleisunamerican.com) to advertise their mission. Impossible Is Un-American was a motto of Charles Bender High School engraved over a back door. The motto descends from the original Humble High School building (built in 1918).

In May 2011, the school district transferred ownership of the building to the City of Humble, who have hopes of preserving it. The district also transferred ownership of the two blocks of land the building sits on (originally donated by the Bender family), which has been the center of the school district since 1909.

In 2015, the school was renovated and became the Charles Bender Performing Arts Center.
