= Humble, Texas =

City in Harris County, Texas, United States

- City
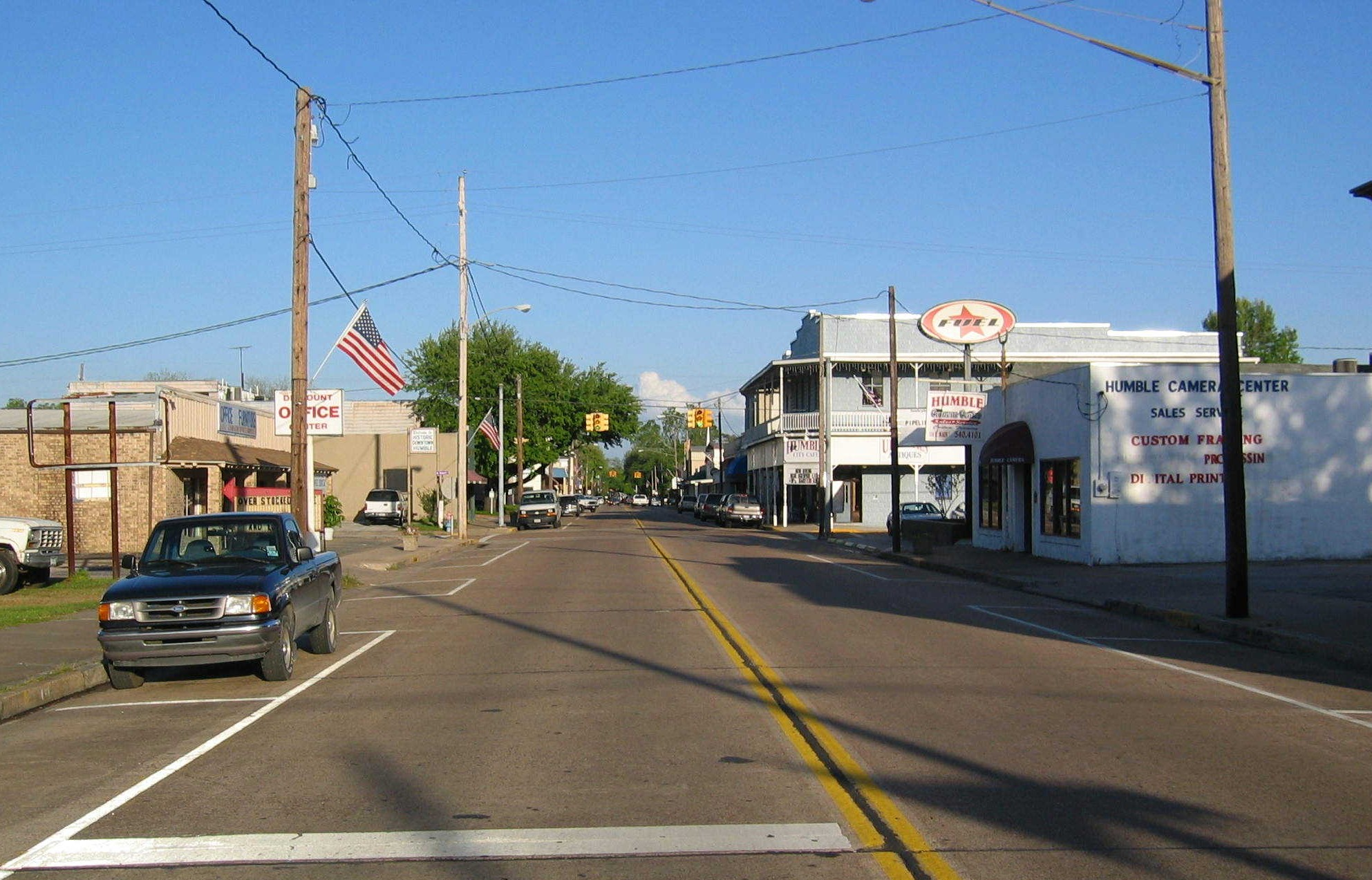
- Downtown Humble facing east, 2005
- Motto: "Where people make a difference"
- Location in Harris County and the state of Texas
- Coordinates: 29°59′53″N 95°15′53″W
- Country: United States
- State: Texas
- County: Harris
- Incorporated: 1933

Government
  - Mayor: Norman Funderburk

Area
  - Total: 9.83 sq mi (25.45 km^{2})
  - Land: 9.76 sq mi (25.29 km^{2})
  - Water: 0.062 sq mi (0.16 km^{2})
- Elevation: 90 ft (27.4 m)

Population (2020)
  - Total: 16,795
  - Density: 1,620.6/sq mi (625.72/km^{2})
- Time zone: UTC-6 (CST)
  - Summer (DST): UTC-5 (CDT)
- ZIP codes: 77338, 77339, 77345-7346, 77396
- PO Boxes: 77205, 77325, 77347
- Area code: 281
- FIPS code: 48-35348
- GNIS feature ID: 1374175
- Website: www.cityofhumbletx.gov

Humble (/ˈʌmbəl/ UM-bəl) is a city located in the Houston metropolitan area. Humble became an oil boomtown in the early 20th century when oil was first discovered there in 1904. By 1905, the Humble oilfield was the largest producing oilfield in Texas. Humble was home of the Humble Oil and Refining Company, a predecessor of Exxon.

As of the 2020 census, the city population was 16,795.

== History ==
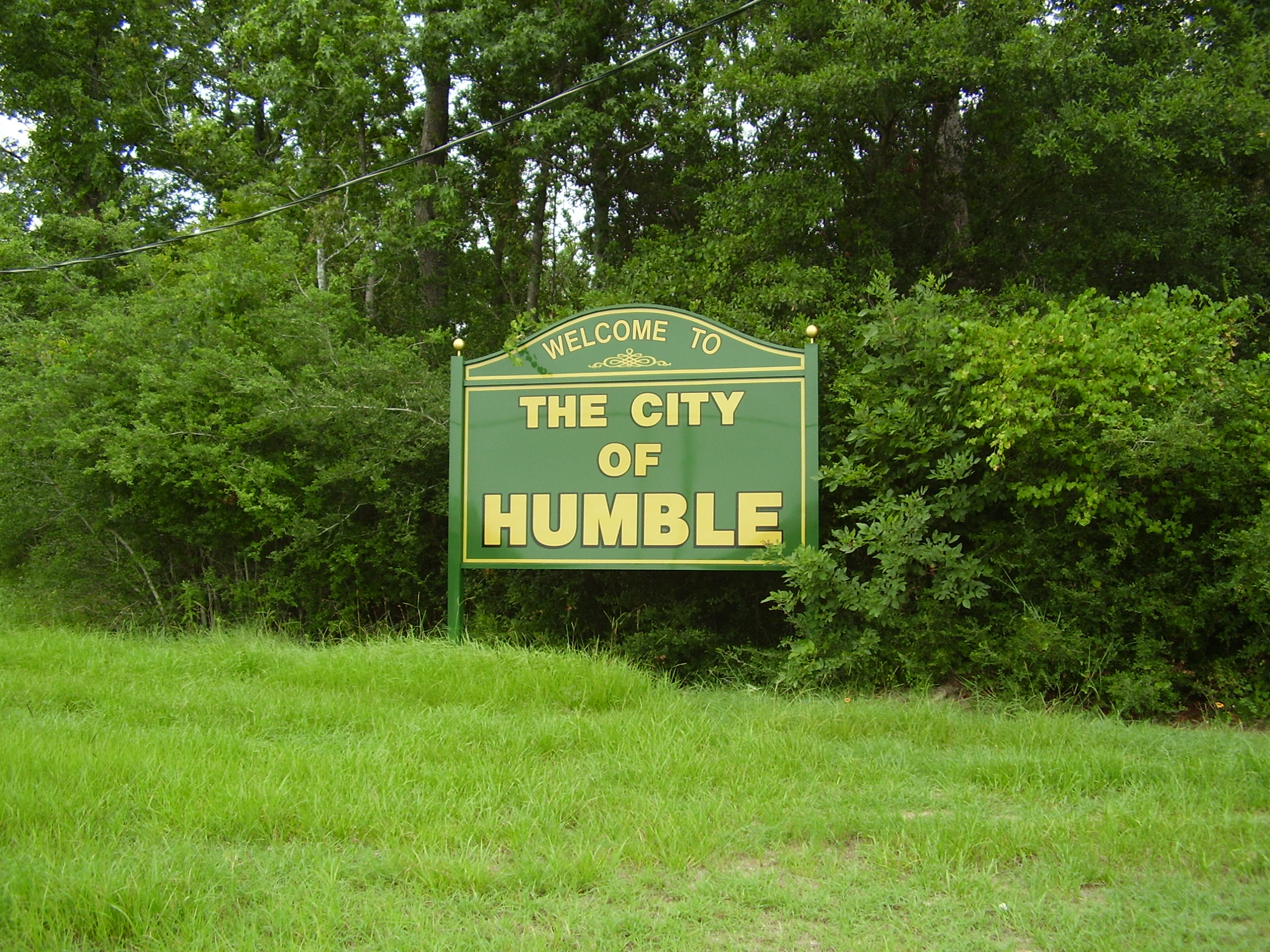
Sign marking Humble

Contemporary settlement of the Humble area began in the early 19th century. Joseph Dunman is believed to be the first settler in 1828. A ferry was built nearby, across the San Jacinto River. The area of Humble became a center for commercial activity due to the region's large oil industry. The city got its name from one of the original founders/settlers, Pleasant Smith Humble, who opened the first post office in his home and later served as justice of the peace. In 1883, a city directory reported that he operated a fruit stand. In 1885, he was a wood dealer, and in 1900, the District 99, Justice Pct. 4, Harris Co., Texas Census reported his occupation as attorney at law.

Humble became an oil boomtown in the early 1900s when oil was first produced there several years after the famous 1901 Spindletop discovery in Beaumont, Texas. Railroad linkage was established in 1904, and shortly thereafter the first tank car of oil was shipped out of Humble's oil field. By 1905 the Humble oilfield was the biggest producing field in Texas. The Humble oil fields are still active and have produced over 138,835,590 barrels (22,073,095 m^{3}) of oil. The town was the home of the Humble Oil & Refining Company, founded in 1911. Standard Oil of New Jersey acquired a 50% interest in Humble in 1919, and the rest of the company in September 1959. Standard continued to use the Humble name until it was phased out as part of Standard's 1973 rebranding as Exxon.

When the oil boom receded, many land owners returned to truck farming, dairy farming and the timber industry.

Humble City Council passed, by a 5–1 vote, a public smoking ban that took effect on March 6, 2012.

== Geography ==
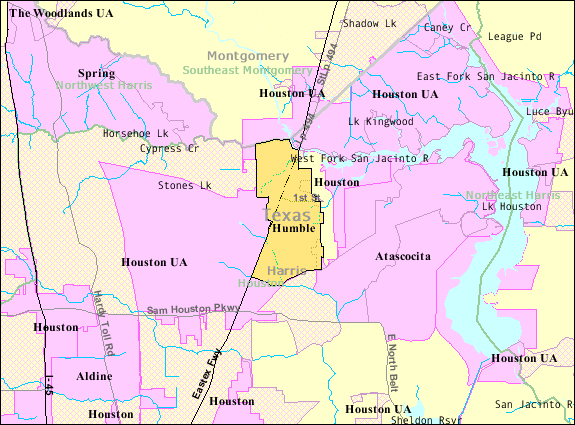
Map of Humble

Humble is located at 29°59′42″N 95°15′54″W (29.994920, –95.264873). According to the United States Census Bureau, the city has a total area of 9.9 square miles (26 km^{2}), of which 9.9 square miles (26 km^{2}) is land and 0.10% is water.

Downtown Humble is located on a salt dome. Most of the petroleum production is shallow and encircles the city by about a 2.5-mile (4.0 km) radius.

=== Climate ===
According to the Köppen Climate Classification system, Humble has a humid subtropical climate, abbreviated "Cfa" on climate maps. It is characterized by hot, humid summers and generally mild to cool winters.

== Demographics ==
Historical population
Census	Pop.	Note	%±
1940	1,371		—
1950	1,388		1.2%
1960	1,711		23.3%
1970	3,272		91.2%
1980	6,729		105.7%
1990	12,060		79.2%
2000	14,579		20.9%
2010	15,133		3.8%
2020	16,795		11.0%
U.S. Decennial Census

=== Racial and ethnic composition ===
Humble city, Texas – Racial and ethnic composition Note: the US Census treats Hispanic/Latino as an ethnic category. This table excludes Latinos from the racial categories and assigns them to a separate category. Hispanics/Latinos may be of any race.
Race / Ethnicity (NH = Non-Hispanic)	Pop 2000	Pop 2010	Pop 2020	% 2000	% 2010	% 2020
White alone (NH)	8,295	4,964	3,807	56.90%	32.80%	22.67%
Black or African American alone (NH)	2,075	3,193	4,596	14.23%	21.10%	27.37%
Native American or Alaska Native alone (NH)	72	45	31	0.49%	0.30%	0.18%
Asian alone (NH)	468	399	408	3.21%	2.64%	2.43%
Native Hawaiian or Pacific Islander alone (NH)	30	129	241	0.21%	0.85%	1.43%
Other race alone (NH)	16	19	74	0.11%	0.13%	0.44%
Mixed race or Multiracial (NH)	217	150	447	1.49%	0.99%	2.66%
Hispanic or Latino (any race)	3,406	6,234	7,191	23.36%	41.19%	42.82%
Total	14,579	15,133	16,795	100.00%	100.00%	100.00%

=== 2020 census ===
As of the 2020 census, there were 16,795 people, 6,151 households, and 3,411 families residing in Humble. The median age was 33.7 years, with 25.9% of residents under the age of 18 and 12.7% who were 65 years of age or older. For every 100 females there were 94.0 males, and for every 100 females age 18 and over there were 90.5 males age 18 and over.

There were 6,151 households in Humble, of which 38.1% had children under the age of 18 living in them. Of all households, 36.0% were married-couple households, 20.9% were households with a male householder and no spouse or partner present, and 34.9% were households with a female householder and no spouse or partner present. About 26.9% of all households were made up of individuals and 8.0% had someone living alone who was 65 years of age or older.

There were 6,651 housing units, of which 7.5% were vacant. The homeowner vacancy rate was 1.4% and the rental vacancy rate was 8.1%.

99.8% of residents lived in urban areas, while 0.2% lived in rural areas.

Racial composition as of the 2020 census
Race	Number	Percent
White	5,187	30.9%
Black or African American	4,691	27.9%
American Indian and Alaska Native	209	1.2%
Asian	417	2.5%
Native Hawaiian and Other Pacific Islander	250	1.5%
Some other race	3,151	18.8%
Two or more races	2,890	17.2%
Hispanic or Latino (of any race)	7,191	42.8%

=== 2000 census ===
As of the census of 2000, there were 14,579 people, 5,460 households, and 3,652 families residing in the city. The population density was 1,477.5 inhabitants per square mile (570.5/km^{2}). There were 5,908 housing units at an average density of 598.7 per square mile (231.2/km^{2}). The racial makeup of the city was 69.24% White, 14.49% African American, 0.68% Native American, 3.22% Asian, 0.26% Pacific Islander, 9.07% from other races, and 3.04% from two or more races. Hispanic or Latino of any race were 23.36% of the population.

There were 5,460 households, out of which 37.0% had children under the age of 18 living with them, 44.6% were married couples living together, 16.8% had a female householder with no husband present, and 33.1% were non-families. 26.3% of all households were made up of individuals, and 5.9% had someone living alone who was 65 years of age or older. The average household size was 2.62 and the average family size was 3.18. In the city the population was spread out, with 28.0% under the age of 18, 12.3% from 18 to 24, 31.8% from 25 to 44, 19.4% from 45 to 64, and 8.5% who were 65 years of age or older. The median age was 30 years. For every 100 females, there were 96.1 males. For every 100 females age 18 and over, there were 91.4 males.

The median income for a household in the city was $37,834, and the median income for a family was $46,399. Males had a median income of $34,434 versus $26,988 for females. The per capita income for the city was $17,678. About 12.2% of families and 15.5% of the population were below the poverty line, including 22.2% of those under age 18 and 7.4% of those age 65 or over. CityData.com says that the crime rates for Humble were higher than the average United States crime rate. The average crime rate for cities with under 30,000 people was 294.7; Humble's crime rate was at 593.7.

== Economy ==
Petroleum has been the basis of Humble's economy since oil was discovered there in the early 1900s. The city was the namesake for Humble Oil and Refining Company, which was acquired by Standard Oil of New Jersey in 1919 and later absorbed in that company's 1973 rebranding as Exxon corporation.

Humble is home to DeLorean Motor Company (aka Classic DMC), a parts and maintenance supplier to owners of the DMC DeLorean, a sports car made famous by the movie Back to the Future. Established in 1995, Classic DMC has no relationship to the original 1980s DeLorean Motor Company of Detroit, Michigan, that produced the car between 1981 and 1983.

== Arts and culture ==
=== Museums and other points of interest ===
The exit ramp for downtown Humble on Interstate 69/U.S. Route 59

- Humble Negro Cemetery
- Humble Museum, 601 Higgins Street

== Parks and recreation ==
The Shell Houston Open, an annual PGA Tour event, is played at Golf Club of Houston, located in an unincorporated area near Humble. The tournament is historically held at the end of March-beginning of April, one week before the Masters, the season's first Major.

== Government ==
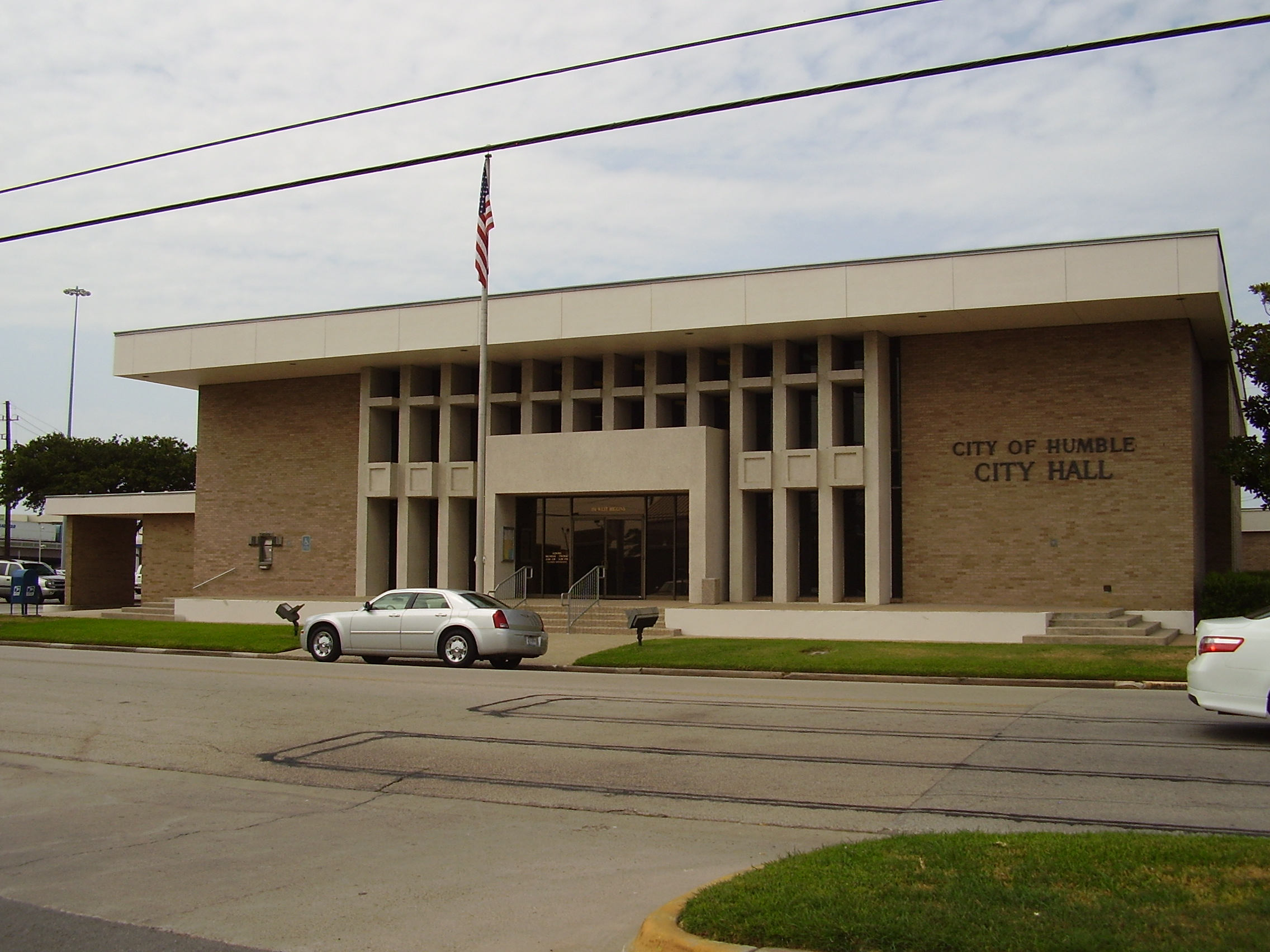
Humble City Hall

=== County, state, and federal representation ===
Harris County operates a tax office at 7900 Will Clayton Parkway in Humble.

The U.S. Postal Service operates the Humble Post Office. Some locations in the City of Houston have Humble mailing addresses.

== Education ==
=== Primary and secondary schools ===
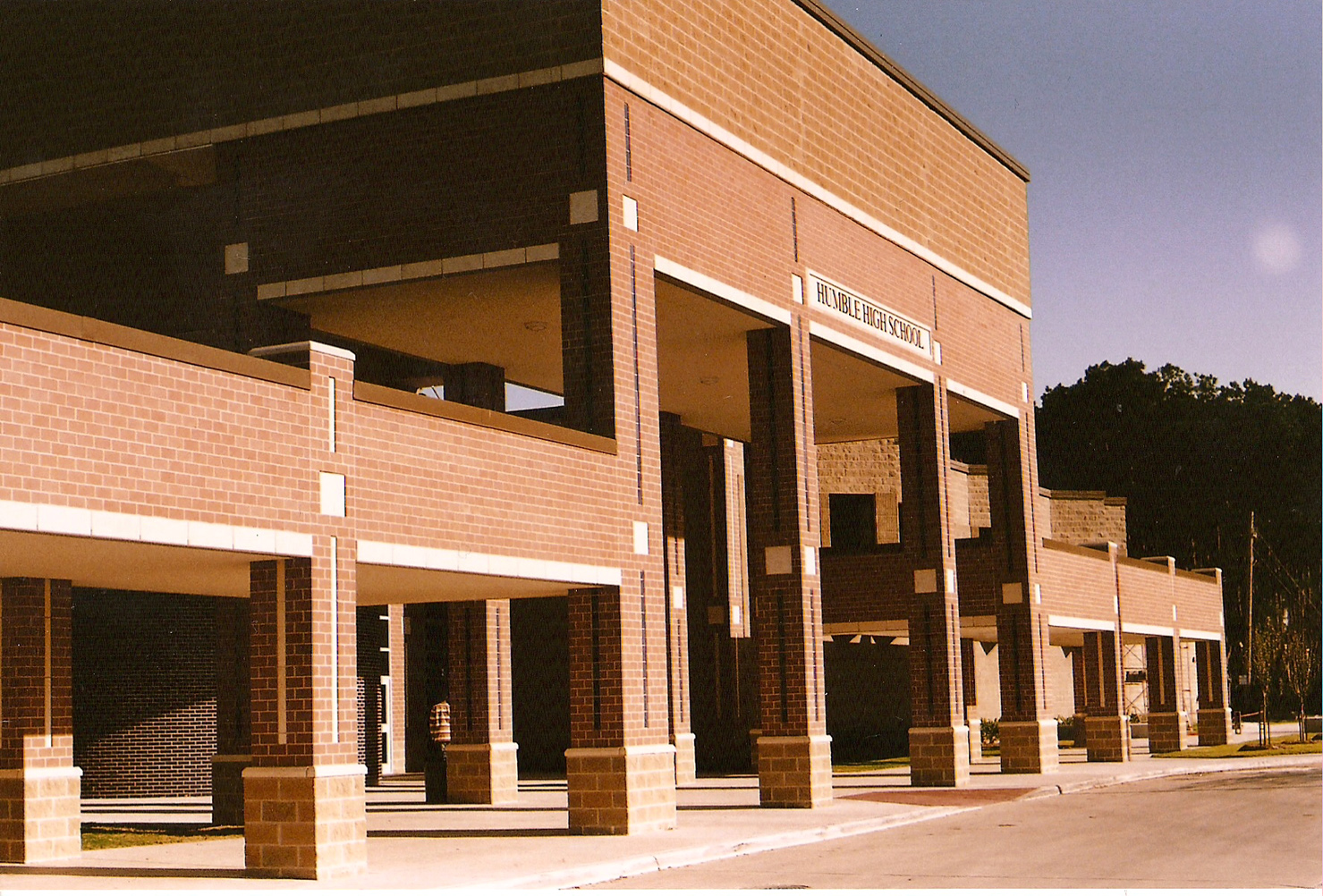
Humble High School

The majority of the city of Humble is served by the Humble Independent School District.

The city of Humble has three public elementary schools:

- Humble Elementary School
- Jack M. Fields, Senior Elementary School
- Lakeland Elementary School

Humble is served by Ross Sterling Middle School (formerly by Humble Middle School), and Humble High School.

All students attending the Humble Independent School District have the option to apply to Guy M. Sconzo Early College, a magnet high school that as of the 2016–2017 school year is contained within but separated from Humble High School. A portion of the city limits is within the Aldine Independent School District (AISD). AISD built Marine D. Jones Middle School (initially named Townsen Boulevard Middle School) in the Humble city limits.

A Christian Prek-12 Humble Christian School, is in Humble. Humble Christian School allows opportunities to families who come from Christian backgrounds. Catholic K–8, St. Mary Magdalene School, is in Humble. The closest Catholic high school is Frassati Catholic High School in north Harris County; the planners of the school intended for it to serve Humble. Holy Trinity Episcopal School, a Christian PK–5 school, is in Harris County, in proximity to Humble. Christian Life Center Academy, a private school, was in a section of the city of Houston, near Humble, while having an Humble postal address. It is now in the Kingwood area of Houston.

=== Community colleges ===
Lone Star College System (formerly the North Harris Montgomery Community College District) serves the area. In 1972, residents of Humble ISD and two other K–12 school districts voted to create the North Harris County College District. The community college district began operations in the Harris County/Montgomery County's northern hemisphere in the fall of 1973. The Humble area is currently served by Lone Star College, Kingwood which operates the Humble Center for outreach.

=== Public libraries ===
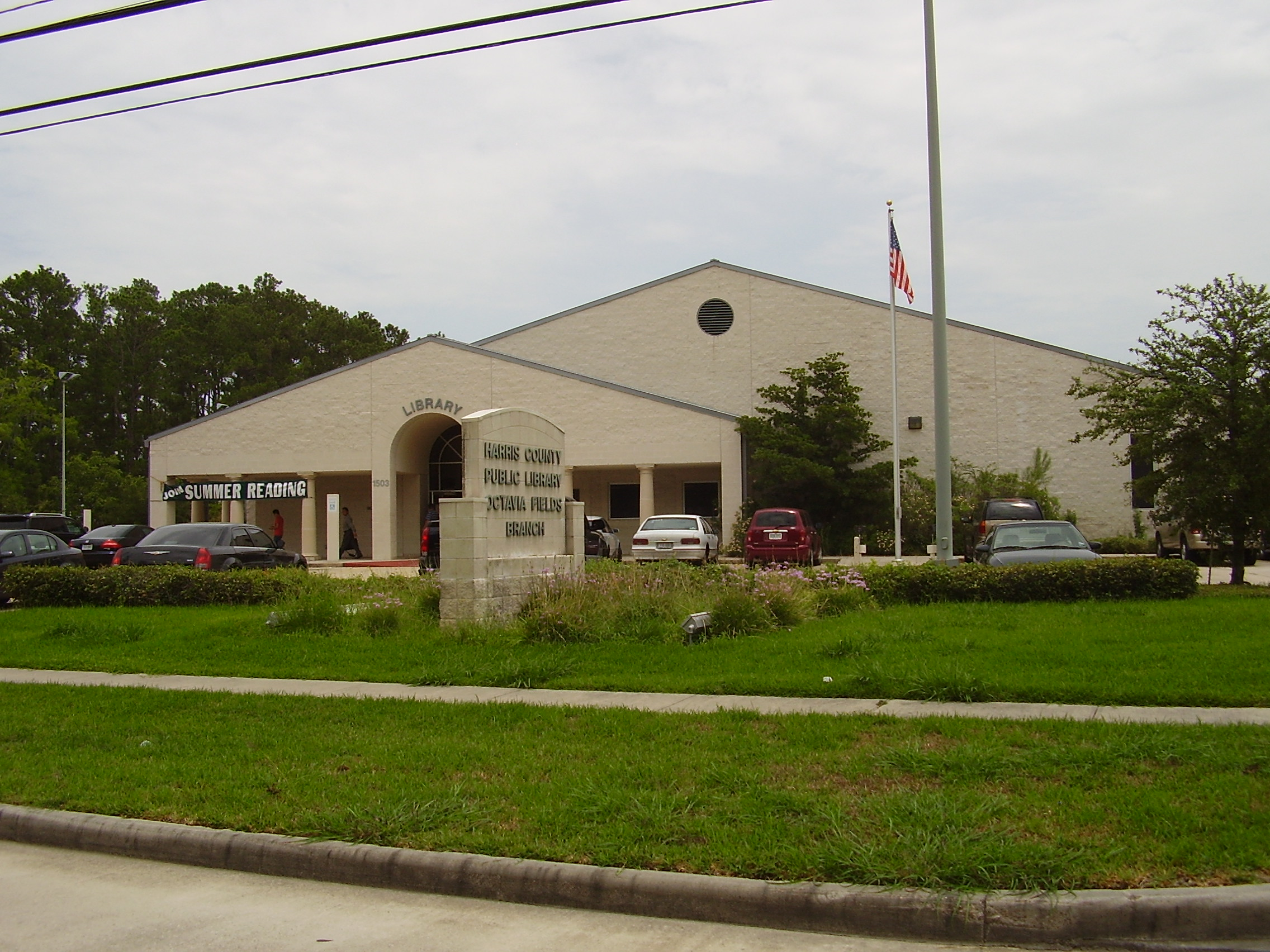
Octavia Fields Branch Library

The Harris County Public Library Octavia Fields Branch Library is located at 1503 South Houston Avenue in Humble. Humble's first public library opened in 1921 with the books stored in the high school. In 1923 the library was split between the Humble High School and the Woodward School at Moonshine Hill. In 1926 the library moved to a church. In 1928 the library moved into the then-new Humble courthouse. In the early 1930s the library moved to city hall. In 1932 the city hall courtroom became a reading room. In the early 1960s a man named Tom Shelton donated a house and lot at the intersection of First Street and Avenue D. The house was remodeled and opened as the Shelton Memorial Library. On October 9, 1969, the library moved to 111 West Higgins Street. It received the name Octavia Fields Memorial Library from Octavia Fields, the grandmother of Jack Fields, a former Congress member. The current 15,000-square-foot (1,400 m^{2}) branch opened on June 27, 2001.

Some areas outside of Humble with Humble postal addresses are in proximity to the Baldwin Boettcher Branch Library at Mercer Park. The 10,137-square-foot (941.8 m^{2}) branch opened in 1986. It was built on donated land. It was named after Baldwin Boettcher, a German settler. His descendants deeded the homestead to Harris County. The plans said that the Boettcher staff would assist the Mercer Park staff in finding any botanical reference books that they or the public need.

== Media ==
Humble news is reported in three community newspapers: Community Impact Newspaper Lake Houston/Humble/Kingwood edition, The Tribune Newspaper and The Observer Newspaper. Community Impact Newspaper covers several Houston Metro suburban areas as well as Austin and DFW Metro markets. The Observer is also the business location of Christian radio station KSBJ, call sign 89.3 FM radio.

Houston Chronicle is the metrowide paper.

== Infrastructure ==
=== Health care ===
Harris County Hospital District operates the E. A. "Squatty" Lyons Health Center in Humble. The clinic opened in 1991, replacing a clinic in Bordersville. The nearest public hospital is Lyndon B. Johnson Hospital in northeast Houston.

Humble Surgical Hospital is a multi-specialty, physician-owned surgical hospital. Humble Surgical Hospital opened in 2010.

=== Postal service ===
The United States Postal Service Humble Post Office is located at 1202 1st Street East. The Foxbrook Finance Unit is located near Humble in an unincorporated area; On Monday May 10, 2008, the Foxbrook post office was dedicated as the "Texas Military Veterans Post Office" in a ceremony hosted by U.S. Congressperson Ted Poe.

=== Prison system ===
- Pam Lychner State Jail, a Texas Department of Criminal Justice state jail for men, is located in Atascocita in unincorporated northeast Harris County, east of Humble.

== Notable people ==
- Imad Baba, soccer player
- Nidal Baba, soccer player
- Jackie Battle, NFL football player
- Bertrand Berry, NFL football player
- Sam Cosmi, NFL/Romanian football player
- Dan Crenshaw, U.S. representative
- Leon Flach, soccer player
- The Grappler, professional wrestler
- Alberto Gonzales, 80th United States Attorney General
- Dan Huberty, Republican member of the Texas House of Representatives from Humble since 2011
- Howard Hughes, entrepreneur, aerospace engineer, filmmaker, inventor, investor, aviator, philanthropist
- Jerrod Johnson, NFL football player
- Donny Kelley, racing driver
- Wakaichiro Ken, sumo wrestler
- David Kersh, country singer
- Bizzle, Christian Rapper
- Hailey Kilgore, actress and singer
- David Meece, Christian musician
- Stephan McCurley, racing driver
- Harold Montgomery, politician, businessman, educator, and farmer; born in Humble
- Aaron Glenn, head coach of the New York Jets and former NFL football player

== Literary references ==
Humble is the site of a Confederate concentration camp in Harry Turtledove's alternate history novel Settling Accounts: In at the Death.

== Gallery ==
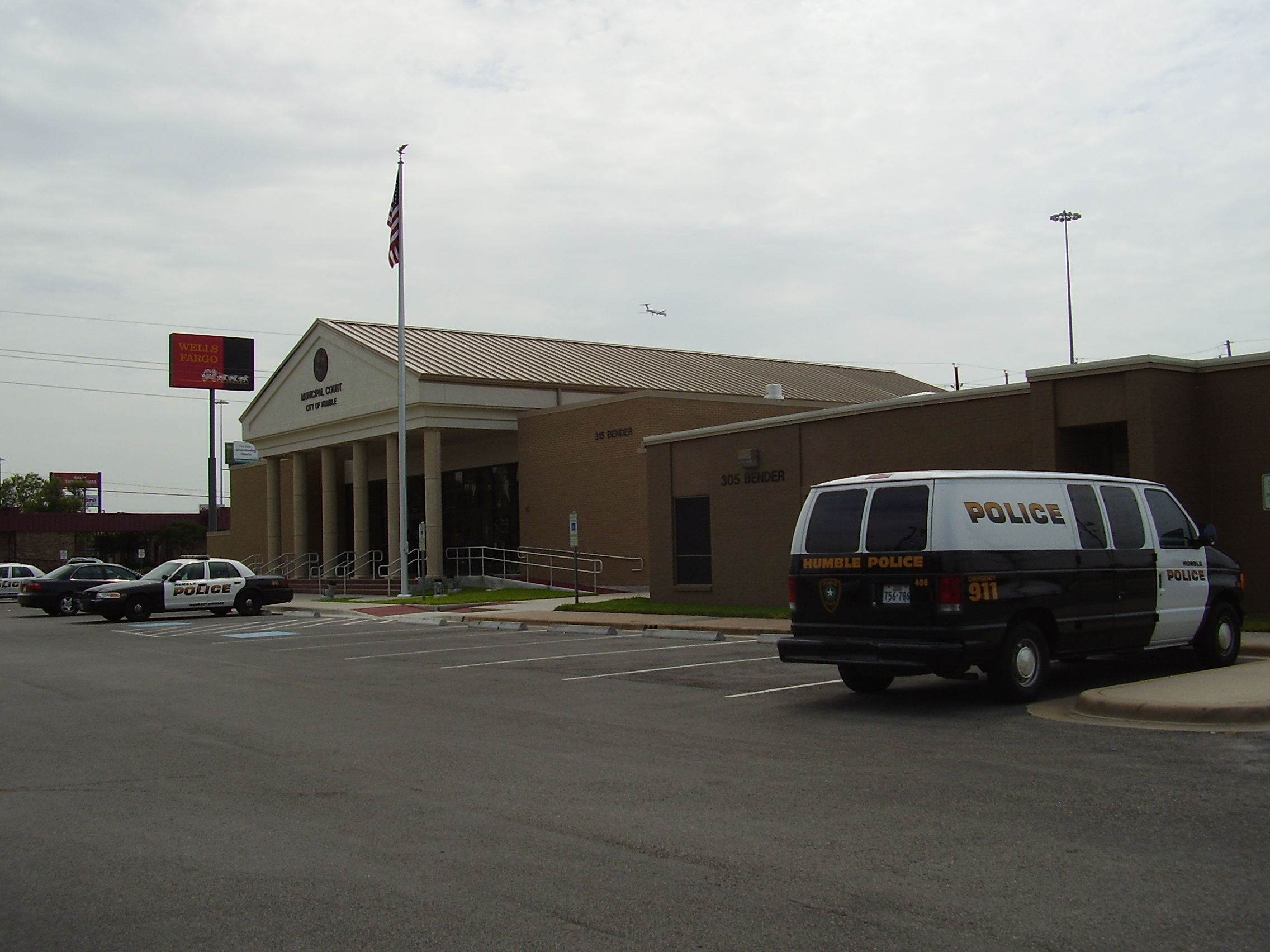
Humble Municipal Court

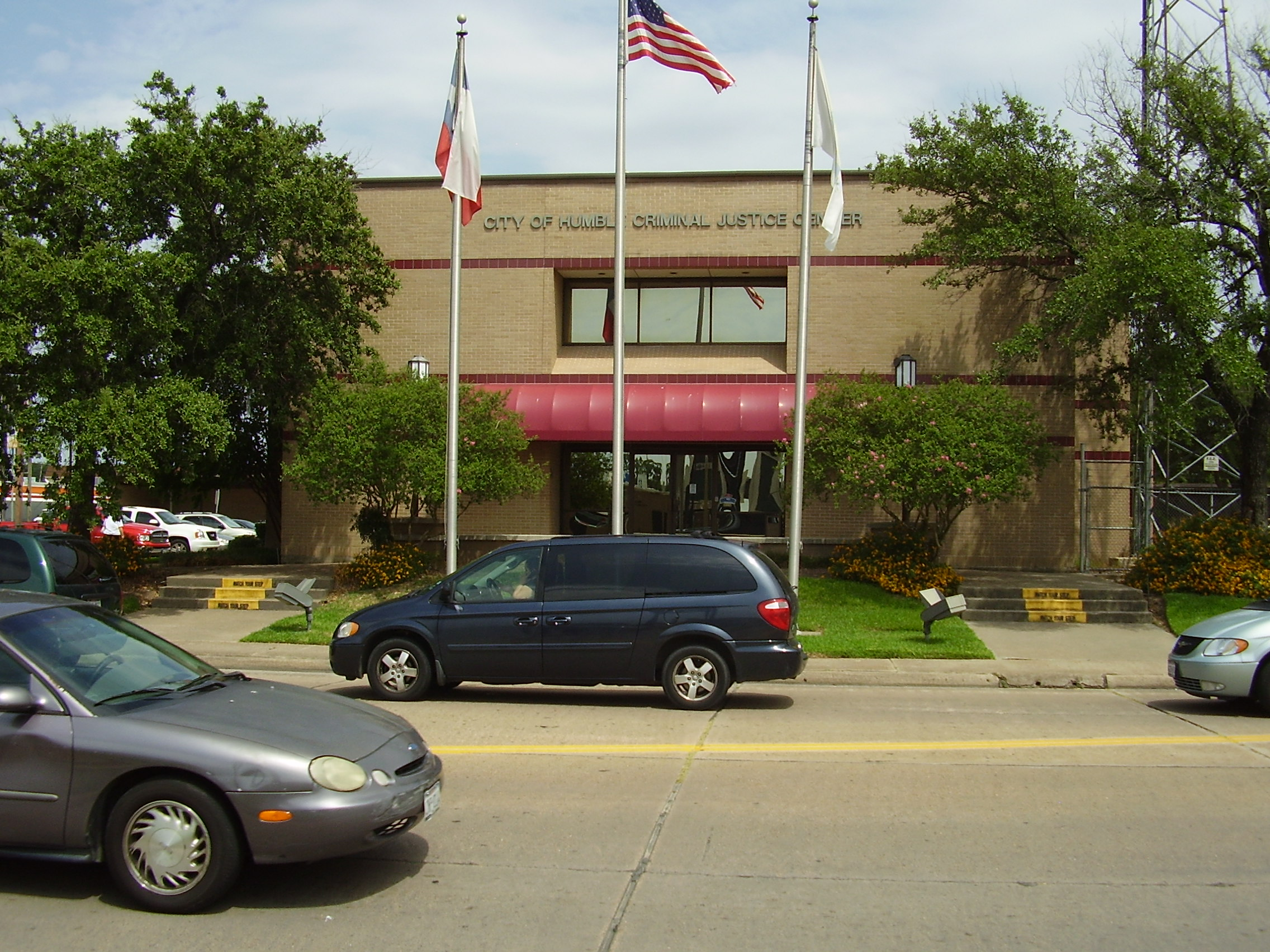
Humble Criminal Justice Center and Humble Police Department

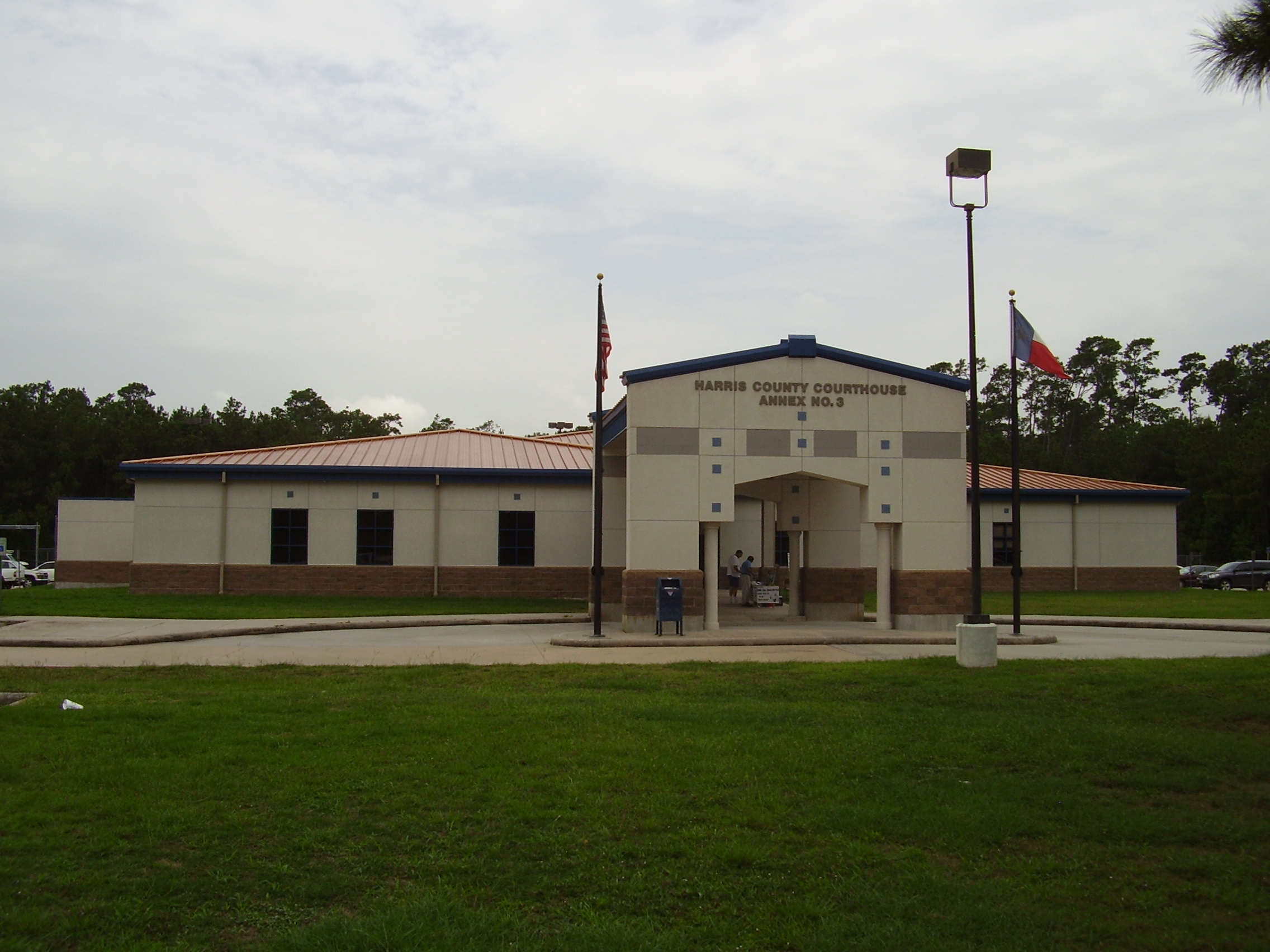
Harris County Courthouse Annex No. 3

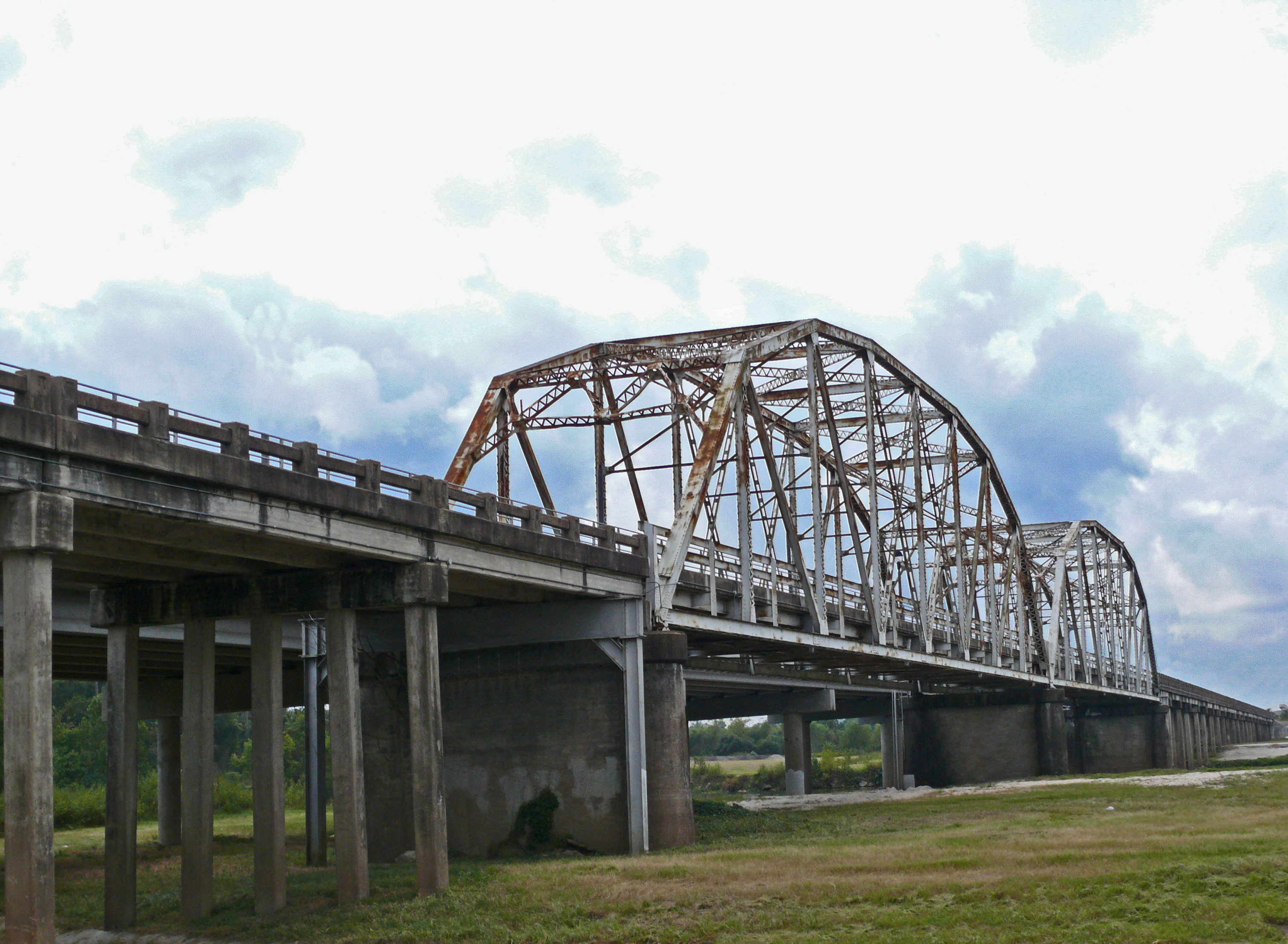
Old San Jacinto River Truss Bridge

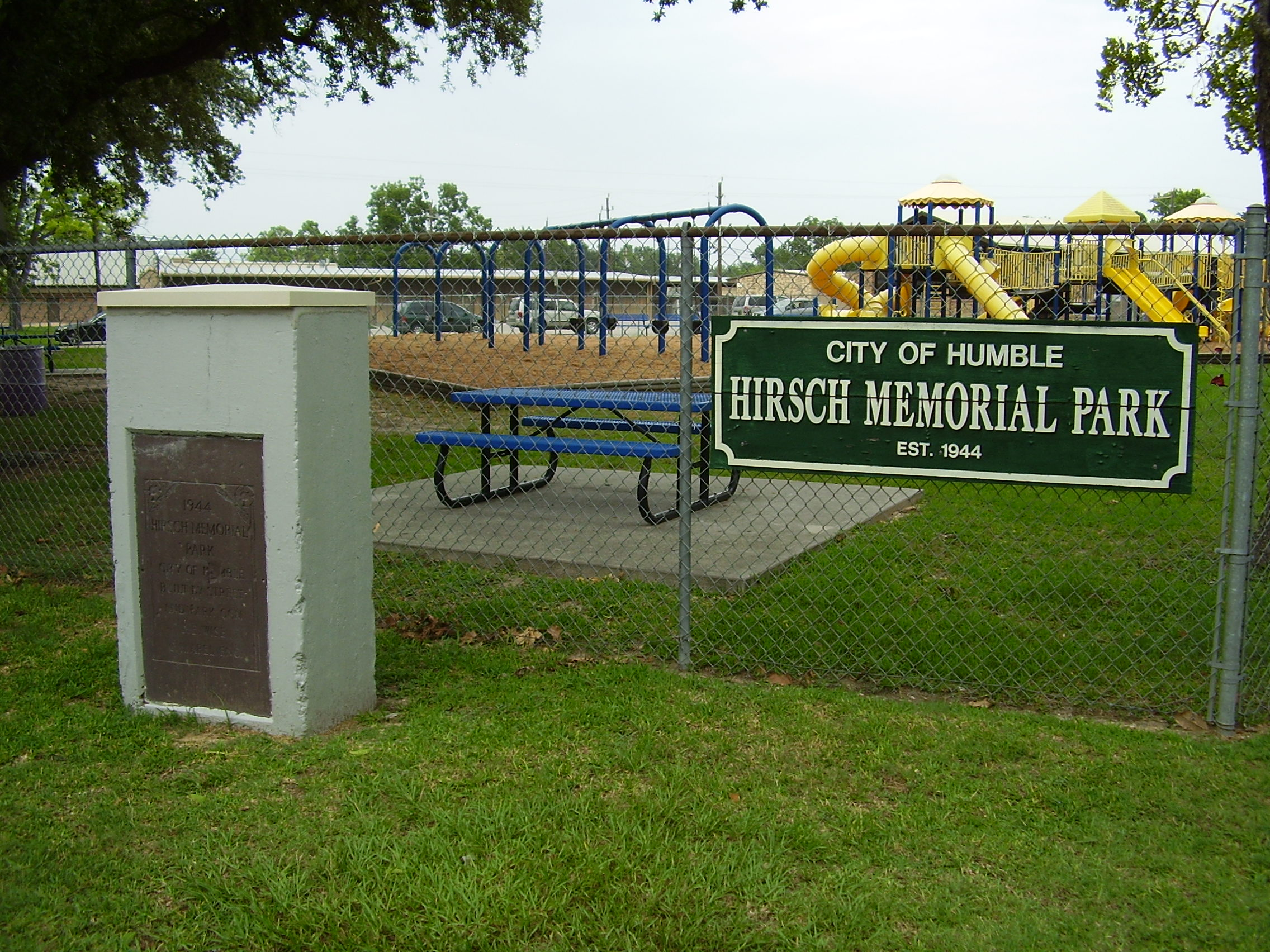
Hirsch Memorial Park

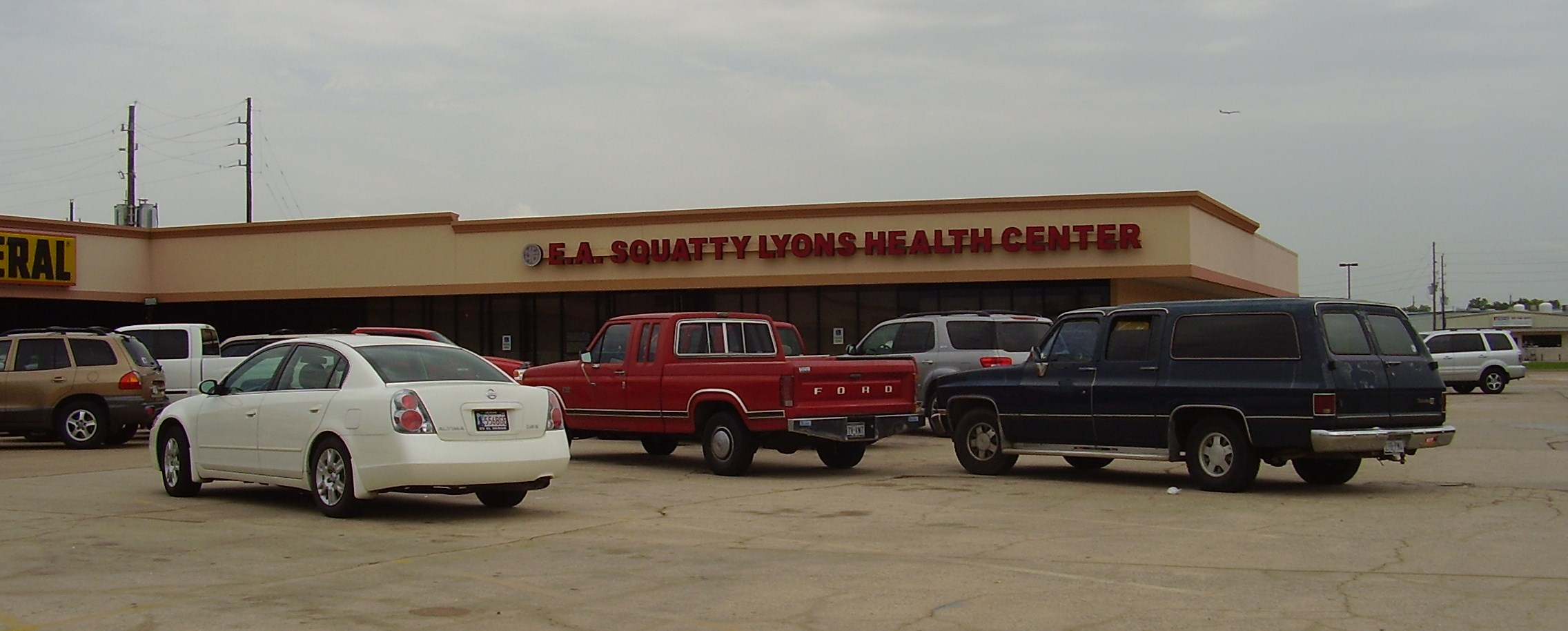
E. A. Squatty Lyons Health Center

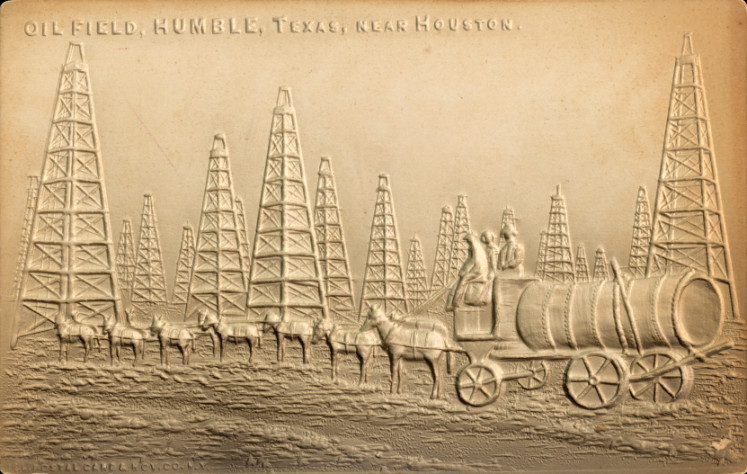
Oil field, Humble, Texas (postcard, c. 1836–2001)

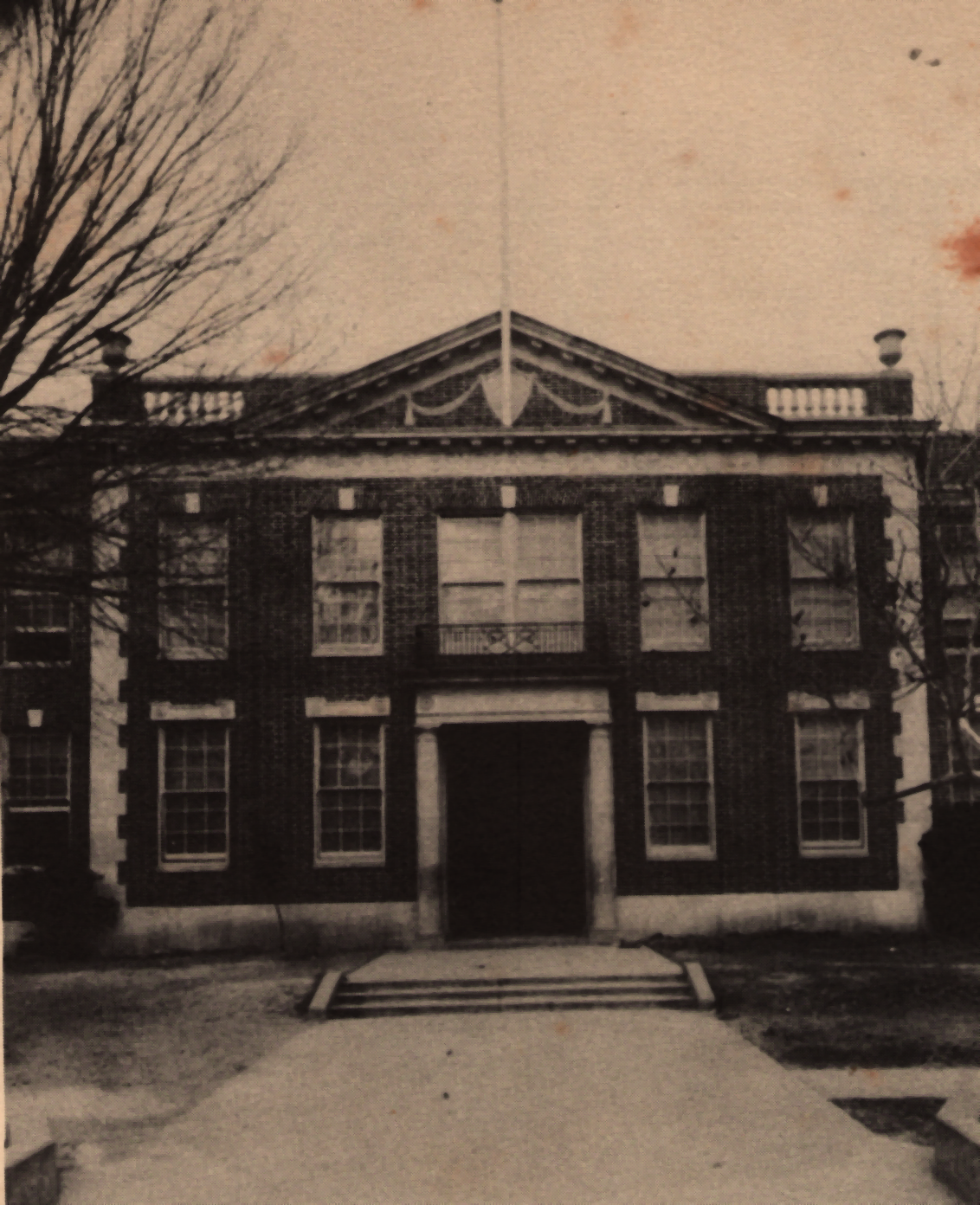
Former Charles Bender High School building

A water tower in Humble; the Wildcats are the Humble High School football team
