= Summer Creek High School =

Public school in Texas, United States

Location
- 14000 Weckford Blvd. Houston, Texas 77044; United States; 29.92556°N 95.20795°W

Information
- School type: Public, secondary
- Motto: "Best is the standard!"
- Opened: 2009
- School district: Humble Independent School District
- Superintendent: Elizabeth Celania-Fagen
- Principal: Matthew Mahony
- Teaching staff: 209.58 FTE
- Grades: 9-12
- Student to teacher ratio: 17.97
- Campus size: 67 acres (270,000 m^{2})
- Campus type: Suburban
- Colors: Maroon and gold
- Athletics conference: UIL 16-AAAAAA
- Sports: Football, Track and Field, Wrestling, Basketball, Swimming, Tennis, Baseball, Volleyball, Golf
- Mascot: Bulldog
- Nickname: The Creek
- Team name: Bulldogs
- Rival: Atascocita High School
- Website: https://www.humbleisd.net/o/schs

Summer Creek High School (SCHS) is a high school in unincorporated Harris County, Texas, and a part of the Humble Independent School District. It serves several areas, including Summerwood and Fall Creek, the two neighborhoods that the school get its name from.

Built to relieve the overcrowded Atascocita HS and Humble HS, SCHS is approximately 435,000 square feet (40,400 m^{2}) and is a comprehensive, ninth through twelfth grade high school for 3,200 students. The campus has athletic facilities and playing fields, an auditorium, a natatorium, a career and vocational education facilities, a food court and a learning resource center. There is also parking for students, staff, and visitors. SCHS is located at 14000 Weckford Boulevard, near the intersection of Beltway 8 and West Lake Houston Parkway.

== History ==
Summer Creek High School opened in the 2009-2010 school year at its current address, 14000 Weckford Boulevard, Houston, Texas. The high school featured its first graduating class in 2012.

Just before the beginning of the 2017–2018 school year, Kingwood High School was badly damaged by flooding caused by Hurricane Harvey. This meant that the students that year took their classes at Summer Creek High.

In December 2023, Summer Creek High participated in the Texas UIL High School State Football Championships, becoming the first high school in the Humble Independent School District to do so.

=== Principals ===
- Trey Kraemer (2008- 2011)
- Thyrun Hurst (2011-2014)
- Nolan Correa (2014- 2017)
- Brent Mcdonald (2017-2023)
- Matthew Mahony (2023-)

== Academics ==
For the 2018–2019 school year, the school received a B grade from the Texas Education Agency, with an overall score of 84 out of 100. The school received a B grade in all three performance domains with a score of 85 for Student Achievement, 80 for School Progress, and 81 for Closing the Gaps. The school did not receive any of the seven possible distinction designations.

== Design ==
Summer Creek High School incorporates a Frank Lloyd Wright style to the exterior facade. The floor plan of Summer Creek is similar to Atascocita High School's, which uses the house system, or smaller learning communities. Each student will be assigned to a "house" in which they will work with an Assistant Principal-Counselor pair for all four years at the school. Core classes (Math, Science, English, and Social Studies) will be attended in that house, but electives will be located in a special wing of the school. The district believes this concept will make a rather large high school feel like a small one.

Quest High School, the district's alternate high school, moved into one of the houses at Summer Creek starting in August 2009. The school has now moved out of Summer Creek High School.

== Alumni ==
- Dakota Allen, former linebacker for the Cleveland Browns
- Xavier Atkins, college football linebacker for the Auburn Tigers
- Lloyd Avant, college football running back for the Oklahoma Sooners
- Kelvin Banks Jr., offensive tackle for the New Orleans Saints
