= Sconzo Early College High School =

Public school in Texas, United States

Coordinates: 29.9801°N 95.2457°W

Guy M. Sconzo Early College High School
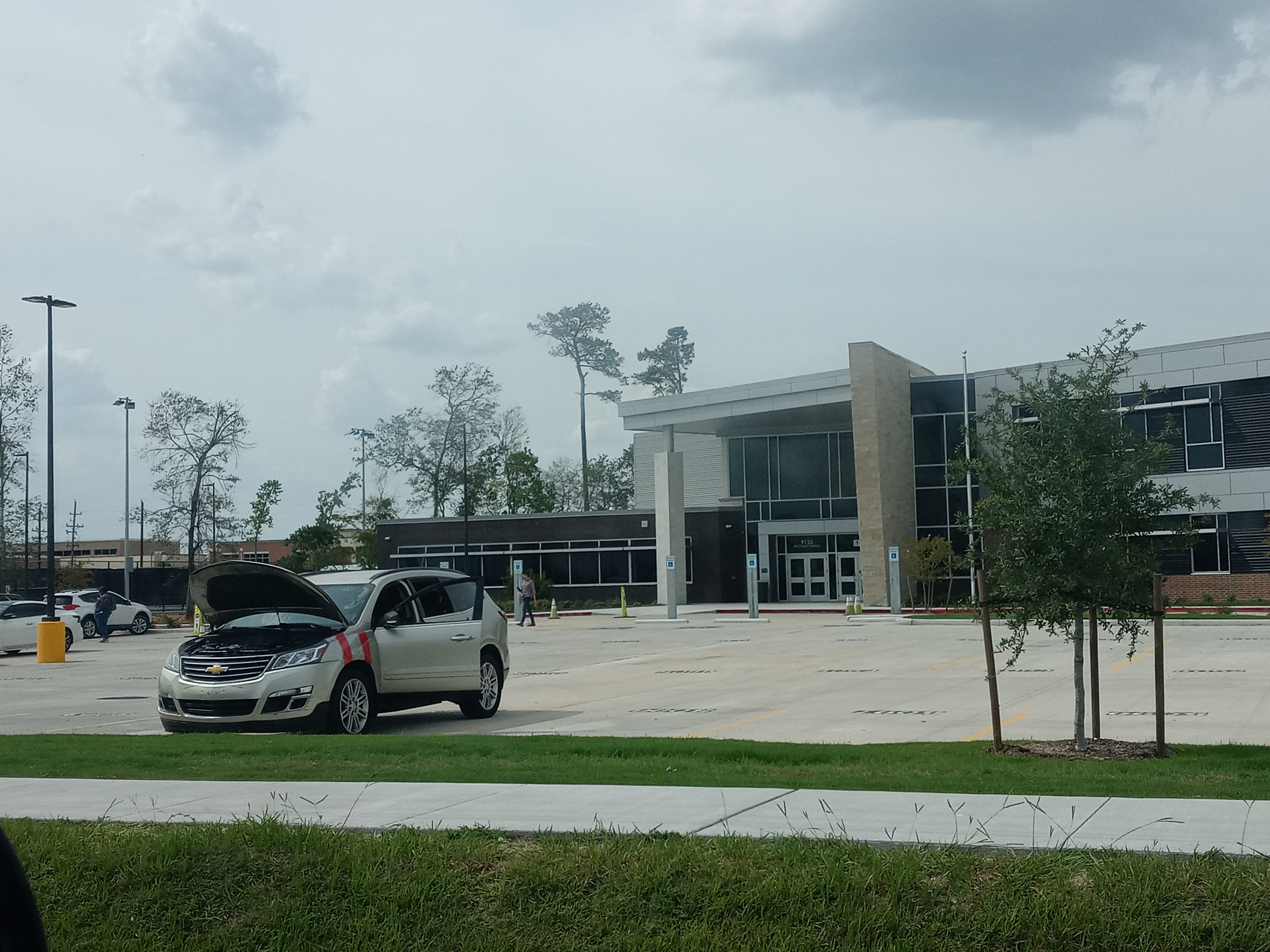

Location
- 9155 Will Clayton Parkway; Humble, Texas 77338; United States

Information
- School type: Public, Early College Secondary School
- Established: 1995
- School district: Humble ISD
- Principal: Nachelle Scott
- Faculty: 21.86 FTE (2019-20)
- Grades: 9–12
- Enrollment: 427 (2019-20)
- Student to teacher ratio: 19.53 (2019-20)
- Campus type: Rural: Fringe
- Colors: Forest Green, Gold
- Mascot: Knight
- Website: Official Website

Guy M. Sconzo Early College High School is a small secondary school in unincorporated Harris County, Texas, near the city of Humble. It is a part of the Humble Independent School District and is an Early College High School. Students can earn an associate degree or hours of college credit toward a bachelor's degree through Lone Star College-Kingwood along with a high school diploma.

== History ==
Established in January 1995 as Quest High School, Quest served the district as an alternative high school that offered students a smaller high school environment as opposed to the district's large schools. The school incorporated a non-traditional curriculum.

In the fall of 2010, Quest was reformatted into an early college high school, with the class of 2014 being the first students to go through the early college program.

Quest High School was in the Community Learning Center from its opening in 1995 to 2009. In the 2009–2010 school year, Quest High School moved into the Summer Creek High School building. As part of the agreement between LSC-Kingwood and Humble ISD, Quest made another move for the 2011–2012 school year to the new Lone Star College Atascocita Center and planned to move again after the end of the school year in 2016 to the Humble High School campus. In August 2020, the school moved into the former Career and Technical Education building. In December 2020, the Humble ISD board of trustees voted to rename the school after former district superintendent Guy M. Sconzo.

== Principals ==
The following persons have served as Principal of Sconzo Early College High School.

Name	Years served	Notes
Linda Wodka	1994-1999	
Cecilia Hawkins	1999-2003	
Lawrence Kohn	2003-2005	
Kim Klepcyk	2005-2012	
Ginger Noyes	2012-2018	
Terri Osborne	2018–2019	
Nachelle Williams	2019–Present	

== Admission ==
Only students entering their freshman year are eligible for admission. A student interested in attending Sconzo completes an application and, with his or her parents, meets with an interview team of staff members. Parents and students are asked to sign written contracts agreeing to the school's rules and requirements. Since college credit is administered, students are required to take an admission test. The test covers their comprehension of math and English (reading and writing). The test scores decide whether students are eligible for dual credit. Quest received the international "2011 Vision in Action: The ASCD Whole Child Award."

== Academics ==
For the 2018-2019 school year, the school received an A grade from the Texas Education Agency, with an overall score of 96 out of 100. The school received an A grade in each of the three performance domains with a score of 97 for Student Achievement, 94 for Student Progress, and 92 for Closing the Gaps. The school received one of the seven possible distinction designations for Academic Achievement in Science.
