= Atascocita High School =

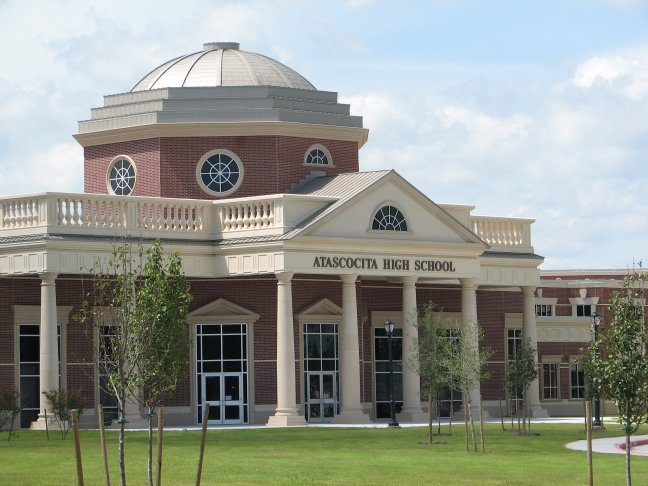
- Atascocita High School

Location
- 13300 Will Clayton Parkway; Humble, Harris County, Texas 77346; United States; 29.979553°N 95.171278°W

Information
- School type: Public School
- Motto: "Learning for life through rigor, relevance, and relationships."
- Opened: 2006
- School district: Humble Independent School District
- Superintendent: Elizabeth Fagen
- Principal: Will Falker
- Teaching staff: 223.01 FTE
- Grades: 9–12
- Enrollment: 3,790 (2023-2024)
- Student to teacher ratio: 16.99
- Campus: Rural: Fringe
- Colors: Red, white, and blue
- Slogan: "All in"
- Mascot: Eagle
- Nickname: The A
- Rivals: Summer Creek High School Kingwood High School
- Newspaper: The Talon
- Feeder schools: Atascocita Middle School, Timberwood Middle School, West Lake Middle School
- Website: www.humbleisd.net/o/ahs

Atascocita High School is a secondary school located in Atascocita CDP, a community housed in unincorporated Harris County, Texas, United States. AHS is a part of Humble Independent School District and serves the eastern part of the district and small portions of the city of Houston.

AHS opened in August 2006, becoming the district's third traditional high school, and the first opened since 1979. Since its opening, it has been the district's largest high school in terms of enrollment. Its school colors are red, white, and blue, and its mascot is the eagle.

== History ==
From its opening, AHS dealt with its own overcrowding problem. During its second year of operation, the campus installed temporary trailer classrooms in one of the parking lots. The following year, a new wing on the east side of the campus was built, the cafeteria was expanded, and the temporary buildings were removed. Finally, in 2009, the district opened Summer Creek High School to serve the large Fall Creek and Summerwood subdivisions. Recently, AHS has again begun to experience an overcrowding issue. During the 2015–2016 school year, it built temporary trailer classrooms again in the parking lot of one of the houses to make room for the influx of students. During the 2021-2022 school year, the school constructed an aptly-named "New Wing" to the west side of the school, providing additional classroom and flex space for additional students. The 2022-2023 school year brought additional temporary trailer classrooms near the Gold LGI.

== House system ==
The campus was originally designed around three communities named after the school's colors: Red, White, and Blue. Each community was divided into two houses: Red 1 and 2, White 1 and 2, Blue 1 and 2. After the school's overcrowding issues, a fourth community, the Gold Community, was added onto the east side of campus. Prior to the 2022-2023 school year, freshmen attended classes in the Gold Community, while the upperclassmen were equally dispersed across the other three communities. As of 2022 in a decision made to prevent frequent disturbances in the Gold community, the freshmen who previously attended classes solely in Gold 1 and 2 were dispersed among the rest of the school.

The idea behind the house system is to have students attend their classes within their houses, providing a smaller environment for students in a large high school. Each house is served by a counselor and an assistant principal. Each house is centered on a "flex area" and shares an LGI (large group instruction), a collegiate-style lecture hall, with its adjacent house.

With the start of the 2018 school year, another part of gold was announced as Gold 3 due to overcrowding.

After AHS became the first high school in the district to use the house system on such a large scale, Humble ISD renovated its two other high schools (Humble and Kingwood) with the house system, and later opened Kingwood Park and Summer Creek high schools with the house system design.

== Academics ==
For the 2018–2019 school year, the school received a B grade from the Texas Education Agency, with an overall score of 85 out of 100. The school received a B grade in two domains, Student Achievement (score of 87) and Closing the Gaps (score of 81), and a C grade in School Progress (score of 78). The school did not receive any of the seven possible distinction designations.

== School activities ==
Atascocita High School has the following activities:

- Audio/Visual Production
- AutoTech
- Band
- Beta Club
- Best Buddies
- Black Student Union
- Choir
- Coding Club
- Chess Club
- Current Events Club
- Key Club
- Debate
- EPT
- FFA
- Gender-Sexuality Alliance (GSA)
- Human Geography Club
- Marine Corps JROTC – The program was founded in August 2011
- Flight Crew
- Math & Science League
- National Honor Society
- Orchestra
- Patriettes
- Project Graduation
- Athletic Training
- Spanish Club
- Student Council
- Theatre

== School sports ==
AHS sports include:

- AHS All Sports Athletic Booster Club
- Baseball
- Basketball - boys'
- Basketball - girls'
- Cheerleading
- Cross country - boys'
- Cross country - girls'
- Diving
- Football
- Golf - boys'
- Golf - girls'
- Gymnastics
- Lacrosse
- Marching Band
- Soccer - boys'
- Soccer - girls'
- Softball
- Swimming
- Tennis
- Track & field - boys'
- Track & field - girls'
- Volleyball
- Wrestling

== Feeder patterns ==
The following elementary schools feed into Atascocita High School:

- Atascocita Springs
- Eagle Springs
- Maplebrook
- Oak Forest
- Oaks
- Pine Forest
- Timbers
- Whispering Pines

The following middle schools feed into Atascocita High School:

- Atascocita
- Timberwood
- West Lake

== Notable alumni ==
- Tory Blaylock, college football running back for the Oklahoma Sooners
- Jamal Branch, professional basketball player
- Austin Colburn, Broadway Performer
- Sam Cosmi, NFL player for the Washington Commanders
- Kam Dewberry, NFL guard for the Atlanta Falcons
- Alex Dixon, soccer player
- Jonathan Dziedzic, baseball player
- Carsen Edwards, basketball player formerly for the Boston Celtics
- Kendall George, baseball player in the Los Angeles Dodgers organization
- Darrell Gill Jr., college football wide receiver for the Ole Miss Rebels
- Kenyon Green, NFL player for the Philadelphia Eagles
- Cardae Mack, college football running back for the Arizona State Sun Devils
- Brice Matthews, baseball player in the Houston Astros organization
- Chase Sowell, college football wide receiver for the Penn State Nittany Lions
- Patrick Taylor Jr., NFL running back for the Green Bay Packers
- Fabian White Jr., NBA G League player for the South Bay Lakers
