= Kingwood, Houston =

Community in Houston, Texas, United States

Kingwood
- community of Houston and Master planned area
- Kingwood
- Nickname: The Livable Forest
- Location within the state of Texas
- Coordinates: 30°03′00″N 95°11′04″W
- Country: United States
- State: Texas
- County: Harris and Montgomery
- Elevation: 48 ft (15 m)

Population (2000)
  - Total: 81,696
- Time zone: UTC-6 (Central (CST))
  - Summer (DST): UTC-5 (CDT)
- ZIP Codes: 77325, 77339, 77345, 77346
- Area codes: 281, 346, 621, 713, 832
- FIPS code: 48-39376
- GNIS feature ID: 1385469

Kingwood is a 14,000-acre (57 km^{2}) master-planned community located in northeast Houston, Texas, United States. The majority of the community is located in Harris County with a small portion in Montgomery County. Known as the "Livable Forest," it is the largest master-planned community in Harris County and second-largest within the 10-county Houston–Pasadena–The Woodlands metropolitan area. It was classified as a "census-designated place" during the 1990 census, when the population recorded was 37,397. It is on the east fork of the San Jacinto River.

Kingwood was created in 1971 as a joint venture between the Friendswood Development Company and King Ranch. Its name was derived as part of that partnership.

== History ==
The Foster Lumber Company originally owned a portion of the tract of land that was later developed into the community of Kingwood. The Foster Family had owned the land since around 1892. On December 28, 1967, the land was sold to the joint venture between King Ranch and the Friendswood Development Company, an Exxon subsidiary. Exxon's Friendswood Development Company hired John Bruton Jr. to serve as the Operations Manager in which he was responsible for the planning, development, engineering, and construction of Kingwood Plans for the community included greenbelts, shopping centers, schools, churches, recreational facilities, riding and hiking trails, and a boat ramp with access to Lake Houston.

The City of Houston annexed portions of what would become Kingwood in the 1960s, but it dis-annexed those portions by the late 1970s, making them unincorporated.

Kingwood was founded in 1970, and the first village opened in 1971. Since the opening, the community had the slogan "The Livable Forest." In 1976 Kingwood had a few thousand residents. Between 1980 and 1990 the community's population increased between 40 percent and 70 percent. In 1990 the community had 19,443 residents and 204 businesses. The population increased to 37,397 in 1992. In 2005 the population was roughly 65,000, and had almost 200,000 people living within a ten-mile (16 km) radius.

In 1994, the City of Houston began the process to annex Kingwood. According to Texas state law at the time, a home-rule city was allowed to annex an unincorporated area, without the consent of the residents, if the area is within the city's extraterritorial jurisdiction. Bob Lanier, then the Mayor of Houston, believed that the annexation of Kingwood would result in a $4 million annual gain for the City of Houston. Lanier argued that the city needed to bring in Kingwood to add more to its tax base. On Wednesday August 21, 1996, the Houston City Council asked the Planning and Development Department to create service plans for Kingwood and Jacintoport, another area being annexed by Houston. The annexation of Kingwood and Jacintoport increased the city's population by about 43,000 people. The annexation meant that areas de-annexed by the city in the 1970s were being re-annexed.

Renée C. Lee of the Houston Chronicle said that Kingwood residents "fought an uphill battle [against annexation] for two years." Kingwood residents offered to pay $4 million to the city in exchange for not being annexed. The residents also filed a federal lawsuit against the City of Houston, claiming that the city was taxing residents without representation. At the time, many residents believed that the City of Houston would not follow through on the state law requirement asking annexing cities to provide equal services to the annexed areas as they do to their original territory. Some residents did not like the idea of the city annexing their community without the community's consent.

In 1996 Thomas Phillips, a retired longshoreman and Bordersville resident, joined with representatives of Kingwood and sued the City of Houston in federal court arguing that the city could not legally annex areas if it did not provide certain services to some of its existing areas, including Bordersville which never had city water. Imad F. Abdullah, the President of Landmark Architects Inc., criticized the residents who fought annexation in his 1996 editorial in the Houston Business Journal, arguing that a "not in my backyard" mentality in particular communities overall negatively affects the entire metropolitan area. Houston annexed Kingwood at 11:59 PM on December 31, 1996, adding about 15,000 acres (6,100 ha) to the city limits.

Kingwood residents lobbied the Texas Legislature, asking for modifications to the state's annexation laws. In 1999 the legislature successfully passed amendments requiring annexing municipalities to develop plans for services provided to communities being annexed, and municipalities are required to provide a three-year planning period prior to official annexation to allow for public comment. The modified law allows for communities to use arbitration if the annexing cities fail to follow through with their service plans. The amendments do not affect prior annexations, including Kingwood's annexation. Some Kingwood residents expressed satisfaction that other suburban unincorporated areas including The Woodlands would not undergo the annexation that occurred in Kingwood.

A 1999 series of robberies were perpetrated by four teenage girls from Kingwood. The film Sugar & Spice was loosely based on the incidents.

In 2006, Kingwood had over 65,000 residents. During that year, ten years after the annexation, Lee said that "[a]nger and resentment that colored the early days of annexation" never dissipated and that most Kingwood residents "have settled in as Houstonians, but who still opposed annexation." Lee said that while residents sometimes complain about high rates for sewer and water services and obvious inadequacies in the fire and EMS services, those residents believe that Kingwood "has greatly suffered from being a part of the city." Lee says that most residents "will never come to terms with Houston's hostile takeover." Lee said that "Services have deteriorated, and the community has lost its identity as a suburban haven as most people had feared" and "Many residents believe the community has not maintained its identity as the Livable Forest[.]"

In 2017, Kingwood suffered evacuations and severe flooding from the after-effects of Hurricane Harvey. The flooding was aggravated by the San Jacinto River Authority's decision to open floodgates.

== Demographics ==
Kingwood first appeared as a census designated place in the 1980 United States census. It was annexed to the city of Houston prior to the 2000 U.S. census.

In 2015 the City of Houston-defined Kingwood Super Neighborhood had 62,067 residents. 79% were non-Hispanic white, 12% were Hispanic, 4% each were non-Hispanic blacks and Asians, and 2% were non-Hispanic others. In 2000 the super neighborhood had 52,899 residents. 88% were non-Hispanic white, 7% were Hispanic, 3% were non-Hispanic Asians, 2% were non-Hispanic blacks, and 1% was non-Hispanic others.

Kingwood includes the zip codes 77325, 77339, 77345, and (in part) 77346. Approximately 81,692 people live within these zip codes. The population density is 2,006 people per square mile.

The median age is 37.2 compared to the US median is 37.6.

68.27% of people in Kingwood (zip 77345), TX, are married, 8.42% are divorced.

The average household size is 2.71 people. 32.49% of people are married, with children. 6.28% have children, but are single.

Race in Kingwood (zip 77339), TX: White population: 75% Black population: 5.55% American Indian population: 0.8% Asian population: 6.8% Native Hawaiian and Other Pacific Islander population: 1.8% Some other race population: 0.9% Two or more races population: 2.8% Hispanic or Latino population: 19.2% http://www.city-data.com/zips/77339.html

Race in Kingwood (zip 77345), TX

80.74% of people are white (non-Hispanic), 3.45% are black, 3.45% are Asian, 0.34% are native American, and .53% claim 'Other'. 9.56% of the people (zip 77345), claim Hispanic ethnicity (meaning 90.44% are non-Hispanic).

The Census Median Household Income for this geographic area is $77,527. The Median Family Income is $84,387, and the Average Non-family Income is $51,735. The Per Capita Income revealed in the Census for this area was $32,491.

== Cityscape ==
Kingwood has over 15,000 acres (6,100 ha) of space. The community, newly suburban and heavily forested, includes over 15,000 acres (6,100 ha) in nature preserves and parks. Renée C. Lee of the Houston Chronicle compared the presence of forests, parks, and trails in Kingwood to the presence of those features in The Woodlands.

Kingwood is thirty miles northeast of Downtown Houston in the piney woods of southeastern Texas. It is divided into neighborhoods called "villages". Most villages have a neighborhood pool and playground providing free access for village residents, an elementary school, and most provide their own set of village-specific services. During the summer, many of the villages organize youth swimming teams affiliated with the Northwest Aquatic League (NWAL).

Trailwood is Kingwood's oldest village, with its first homes being completed in 1971. While Kingwood is almost built out, there are some new homes still being built in Royal Shores and Woodridge Forest.

The villages of Kingwood include Barrington, Bear Branch, Deer Ridge Estates, Elm Grove, Fosters Mill, Greentree, Hunters Ridge, Kings Crossing, Kings Crossing Patio Homes, Kings Crossing XIV, Kings Forest, Kings Forest Estates, Kings Point, Kings River, Kingwood Glen, Kingwood Greens, Kingwood Lakes, Kingwood Place, Mills Branch, North Woodland Hills, Reserve at Kings Point, River Bend, Riverchase, Royal Shores, Sand Creek, Sherwood Trails, South Woodland Hills, Trailwood, Woodridge Forest, Woodspring Forest, and Woodstream. Nearby developments include Forest Cove, Kings Lake Estates, Lakewood Cove, North Kingwood Forest, Oakhurst at Kingwood, King's Mill, and King's Manor. Oakhurst does not pay Kingwood Service Association fees, though it is considered part of Kingwood and is also developed by Friendswood Development.

Kingwood is home to ClubCorp's Kingwood Country Club. It is the largest private club in Houston and one of the biggest in the world, with over 3,300 members. The golf courses and clubhouses were used in the filming of the 1996 movie, "Tin Cup" starring Kevin Costner.

== Media ==
The citywide newspaper is the Houston Chronicle.

Kingwood has two community newspapers, The Tribune Newspaper and The Kingwood Observer.

== Crime rate ==
In January through August 2003, the crime rate in Kingwood was 1,793 per 100,000 residents. Less than 10% of crimes were violent. During January through August 2006, the crime rate was 1,364 per 100,000 residents. In this case, less than 10% of the crimes were violent.

In 1999 Sergeant G.A. MacAnulty of the Houston Police Department, who worked at the Kingwood substation, stated that almost all of the crime is perpetrated by juveniles. Vandalism had often occurred in the community. An unpublished study commissioned by the Friendswood Development Corporation and the Clergy Association of Kingwood concluded that the root of crime is due to the lack of recreational activities available in Kingwood. Dewan wrote that according to many youth there was a significant amount of recreational drug consumption in Kingwood.

== Economy ==
The human resources company Insperity (formerly Administaff) has its headquarters in Kingwood.

== Education ==
As of 1999, about 90% of children raised in Kingwood attended colleges and universities.

=== Primary and secondary schools ===
==== Public schools ====
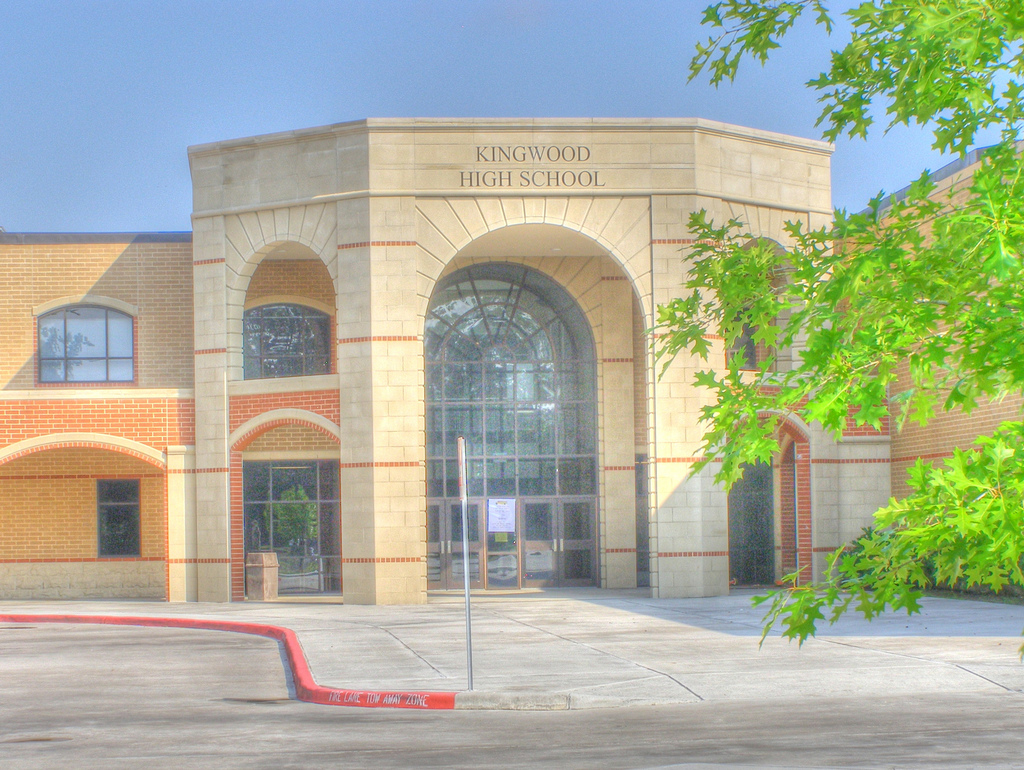
Kingwood High School

Kingwood pupils residing in Harris County attend the Humble Independent School District. Kingwood High School (6A) and Kingwood Park High School (5A) serve the area. All students enrolled in Humble Independent School District also have the option to attend Quest High School, a magnet high school in Atascocita.

The 1996 annexation of Kingwood did not change school district boundaries nor did it change any attendance zones of individual public schools.

Students residing in Montgomery County attend the New Caney Independent School District. Residents of that portion attend Porter High School (5A). Before the opening of Porter High School in 2010, students attended New Caney High School. A small portion of North Woodland Hills, as well as the Kings Manor, Kings Mill, Woodridge Forest, and Oakhurst at Kingwood developments, are located in Montgomery County.

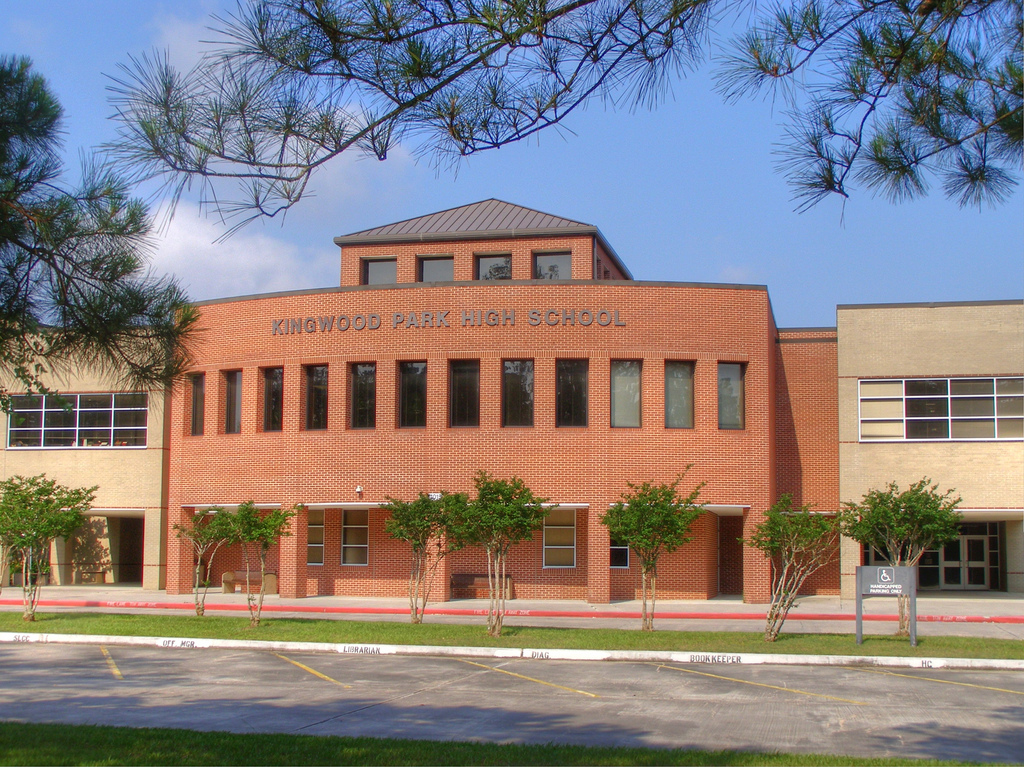
Kingwood Park High School

Kingwood is served by three Humble ISD middle schools: Kingwood Middle School, Creekwood Middle School and Riverwood Middle School. Kingwood Middle School students are zoned to Kingwood Park High School, while students attending Creekwood and Riverwood are zoned to Kingwood High School.

Middle school students in areas of Kingwood in New Caney ISD attend Woodridge Middle School. Sixth graders in New Caney ISD previously attended the New Caney 6th Grade Campus.

In addition to the high schools and middle schools, Kingwood is served by nine Humble ISD elementary schools: Foster Elementary, Woodland Hills Elementary, Deerwood Elementary, Willow Creek Elementary, Bear Branch Elementary, Greentree Elementary, Shadow Forest Elementary, Elm Grove Elementary, and Hidden Hollow Elementary.

Kings Manor Elementary School serves Kingwood New Caney ISD students.

==== Private schools ====
Private schools in Kingwood include The Covenant Preparatory School (formerly Northeast Christian Academy) (PreK-12th), St. Martha Catholic School (PreK-8), Kingwood Montessori School (PreK-6th), Pines Montessori School (Toddlers - Middle School), and Christian Life Center Academy (PreK-12th).

Holy Trinity Episcopal School, a Christian PK-5 school, is in Harris County, in proximity to Kingwood. The closest Catholic high school is Frassati Catholic High School in north Harris County; the planners of the school considered Kingwood to be in the area it serves. In addition St. Thomas High School, an all boys' high school in central Houston, has a bus service from and to St. Martha Catholic School.

=== Colleges and universities ===
Lone Star College-Kingwood is a two-year community college that serves the area and it is part of the Lone Star College System.

Lone Star, under Texas law, serves several districts, including Humble ISD and New Caney ISD.

=== Public libraries ===
Dedicated on August 12, 1983, the 12,000-square-foot (1,100 m^{2}) original Kingwood Branch of the Harris County Public Library, had over 112,000 books. In partnership with the Houston Public Library, plans were made to replace the original branch with a new a "City-County" branch in exchange for 4.2 million dollars to fund the building of a new 35,000-square-foot (3,300 m^{2}) facility. The original Kingwood Library location closed on March 13, 2010, and the new location opened on April 19, 2010. The demolished building was replaced by a new community center.

In addition to the Kingwood Library, and within Kingwood, there is also the Kingwood Community College library, which permits access for "currently enrolled students, high school students and adults living within the district, patrons of Montgomery County Memorial Library System, and college employees."

== Government and infrastructure ==
=== Local government ===
The City of Houston provides police, fire and ambulance services. The Houston Public Works Department is responsible for the maintenance and construction of roads in Kingwood. The City of Houston maintains water services. Before the annexation, 13 municipal utility districts (MUD) provided those services. After annexation, water and sewer bills increased; most residents had their water bills be double and triple the billed amounts prior to annexation. In 2006 Mayor of Houston Bill White said that the city had to cover the debts of the MUDs, so it increased the water and sewer rates.

Houston City Council District E serves Kingwood. Dave Martin currently represents the district. District E contains Kingwood and the Houston portion of Clear Lake City. The City of Houston has a liaison who works with the District E representative and the residents of Kingwood. In 2006 some Kingwood residents told the Houston Chronicle that the District E representative has too little influence in city council, which had 15 seats during that year, and that the district is, in the words of Renée C. Lee of the Houston Chronicle, territorially "spread too thin."

METRO operates a single Park and Ride location in Kingwood to provide commuters with an alternative to driving themselves downtown.

The Kingwood Chamber of Commerce serves local businesses and the community with regular activities such as Kleenwood.

Around the time of annexation, much of the controversy regarding the annexation centered on the fire and police services. Residents believed that they received a higher quality of police and fire services than the City of Houston offered. When Kingwood became a part of Houston, residents could no longer legally discharge fireworks in Kingwood due to a City of Houston ban. Ordinarily the city government would, post-annexation, allow volunteer fire departments to continue operating under a contract. Due to an inability reach an agreement with the Kingwood Volunteer Fire Department, the city as of 1996 planned to immediately establish fire services after annexation.

The Kingwood community associations control the deed restrictions of the neighborhoods.

=== Police ===
The Houston Police Department's Kingwood Patrol Division, headquartered at 3915 Rustic Woods Drive, provides law enforcement services to Kingwood. As of 2006 the police station has a captain and 74 patrol and supervisor police officers. Bill White, Mayor of Houston in 2006, said that Kingwood had fair police services. Of the communities of Houston, Kingwood has the lowest number of police officers in relation to the overall number of crimes committed in the city. White also said that he received requests to remove police officers from Kingwood and place them in areas of Houston with higher crime rates. White said that he refused the requests since the removal would impact response times in Kingwood, the worst in the city.

Minors under the age of 17 are subject to a Houston mandated curfew after 11:00PM Sunday through Thursday, or 12:00AM on Friday and Saturday (baring few minor exceptions.) This curfew extends to fill the time between 9AM until 2:30PM on days when school is in session. John Cannon, a spokesman for the HPD says, "the curfew is to ensure that kids are in school getting an education."

Prior to annexation, the Harris County Precinct 4 Constable provided law enforcement services. Initially after annexation, the Kingwood Storefront of the Northeast Patrol Division served Kingwood.

=== Fire ===
Kingwood's fire stations are within Houston Fire District 102, operated by the Houston Fire Department. There are four stations located within Kingwood: Station 101, Station 102, Station 103 and Station 104. A fifth station, Station 105, is outside of Kingwood and in the same fire district. As of 2006, the Kingwood fire stations include one district chief, 30 firefighters, three medic units, and nine pieces of equipment.

When the City of Houston annexed Kingwood in 1996, the city acquired four stations held by the Kingwood Volunteer Fire Department (VFD). The stations acquired were numbered by the city from 101 to 104. Before the annexation, the department had up to 80 paid and volunteer firefighters and twelve pieces of equipment. After annexation the city added one more fire station. Mike Byers, a Kingwood resident quoted in the Houston Chronicle and the president of the Humble Area Chamber of Commerce, said that because many of the volunteer fire department members were friends and neighbors of Kingwood residents, the Kingwood residents had difficulty with the loss of the VFD and the city taking the money. He added that many of the new staff of the emergency services stations were not familiar with Kingwood, and some were unable to find certain locations, leading to slow response times and 11 deaths. As of 2006 Byers says that the City of Houston now provides fair emergency services to Kingwood residents.

Bill White, Mayor of Houston in 2006, said during that year that Kingwood had "a great fire and EMS service with one of our best captains in the Kingwood area, and I have not gotten any complaints about fire and EMS response times, which is one of the best in the nation." In 2006 Mike Fuhre, the former chief of the Kingwood VFD, criticized HFD for allocating fewer staff and pieces of equipment to Kingwood than had existed during the existence of the VFD. Fuhre said that there were occasions when Kingwood had no coverage because all of the firefighters were called to other locations, and still do.

=== County, state, and federal representation ===
Kingwood residents vote mostly Republican, and representatives of Kingwood on local and state levels tend to be Republican. The Harris County portion of Kingwood lies in Harris County Precinct 4 (PCT4). As of 2021 PCT4's commissioner is Jack Cagle and the constable is Mark Herman.

The Harris County section of Kingwood is located in District 127 of the Texas House of Representatives. As of 2021, Dan Huberty represents the district. The Montgomery County section of Kingwood is located in District 16 of the Texas House of Representatives. As of 2021, Will Metcalf represents the district. Kingwood is within District 4 of the Texas Senate; as of 2021 Brandon Creighton represents that district.

Kingwood is in Texas's 2nd congressional district. As of 2021, Dan Crenshaw represents the district.

The United States Postal Service Kingwood Post Office is located at 4025 Feather Lakes Way. After the 1996 annexation of Kingwood, residents retained "Kingwood, Texas" mailing addresses, and some places in the Houston city limits before the annexation had Kingwood mailing addresses.

=== Healthcare ===
Harris Health System (formerly Harris County Hospital District), the hospital district for Harris County, operates E. A. "Squatty" Lyons Health Center in Humble. The nearest public hospital is Lyndon B. Johnson Hospital in northeast Houston.

Montgomery County Hospital District (MCHD) is the hospital district for people in Montgomery County.

== Parks and recreation ==
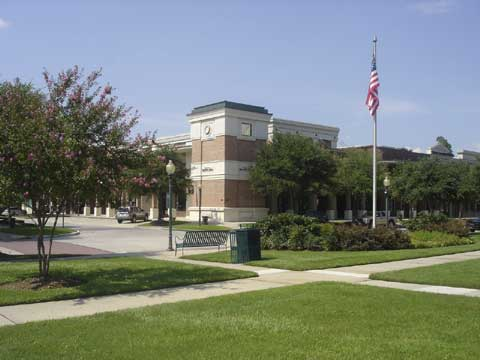
Kingwood Town Center

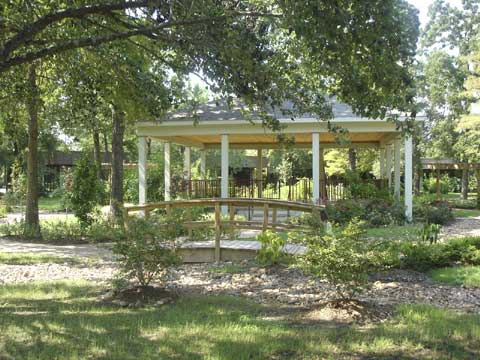
The People's Park in Kingwood

Kingwood has over 500 acres (200 ha) of nature preserves and parks, and it has over 75 miles (121 km) of hike and bicycle trails. The parks and trails are owned by the Kingwood community.

The greenbelt trails' maintenance is the responsibility of the trail association in each village with the exception of Trailwood Village. Over 75 miles (121 km) of greenbelts comb the area. In addition, each village association maintains a park and swimming pool for the benefit of its residents.

The area is also home to Kingwood Park, operated by the City of Houston, and East End Park, owned and operated by the Kingwood Service Association.

Creekwood Nature Area is a 50-acre nature site with hiking trails owned and operated by the Kingwood Service Association, it's entrance located at the end of Maple Park Drive in Bear Branch Village.

Northpark Recreation area, a 19-acre park located on Woodland Hills Drive, north of Kingwood Park High School, including 5 soccer fields, 1 adult-sized softball field, and 4 child-sized softball fields, is used solely for leasing to organized sports groups. Land is leased to the Kingwood Alliance Soccer Club, Kingwood Adult Softball Association, and the Kingwood Girls Softball Association.

Located on Hundred Oak Circle, there is a 63-acre park and recreation center named Deer Ridge, owned and operated by the Kingwood Service Association, which includes two tennis courts, a basketball court, a sand volleyball court, restrooms, shaded picnic area, duck pond, gazebo, and a playground area. There is also sports fields leased to the Texas Heatwave Soccer Club and Kingwood/Forest Cove Baseball, being leased a soccer field and 6 baseball fields, respectively. Park land and horse stables are leased to the Kingwood Horsemen's Association.

At the south end of Woodland Hills Drive, there is River Grove, a 74-acre park with activities including 18-hole disc golf course, boat ramp with access to Lake Houston, fishing, picnic areas (including 4 covered picnic shelters with grills), playground area, pavilion facility, and restrooms. The 15 lacrosse and soccer fields are leased to the Kingwood Alliance Soccer Club and Kingwood Youth Lacrosse.

Kingwood Skate Park opened on May 21, 2004, a 5,402-square-foot (501.9 m^{2}) City of Houston facility that has skate benches, a kinked round grind rail, skate benches, skate tables, a kicker ramp, a bank to stair with a rail, shade structures that include benches, a drinking fountain, a mini half pipe with a ninety degree hip, and a skateboarder-shaped bike rack. It was the first municipal skate park built by the city.

A 2.25-acre (9,100 m^{2}) public dog park opened in 2007.

The City of Houston operates the Dylan Duncan Memorial Park. It includes a picnic pavilion and a skate facility.

=== Events ===
Kingwood residents enjoy a number of community events throughout the year, including:

- Mardi Gras, held in February in the Town Center Park. It has a parade and vendor fair with open-air concert.
- Picnic on the Park, held the day before Easter in the Town Center Park, has an Easter Egg hunt open to children of all ages. The event also offers game booths, a vendor fair, and performances by local area groups.
- Auto Shows, held in spring and fall, often April and October, at Town Center Park. Typically draws up to 200 vehicles in a wide variety of categories.
- Fourth of July, has a parade between Creekwood Middle School and Kingwood High School; festivities in Town Center Park, and fireworks display with an open-air concert and vendor fair.
- Christmas in the Park, held in Town Center Park, is a vendor fair that features live performances from local groups. The day ends with a tree lighting ceremony in the park.
- Holocaust March of Remembrance, held each year to educate area residents about the Holocaust. The first March of Remembrance in the Houston area was held in Kingwood in 2012.

== Notable people ==
- Allie DeBerry, actress and model, appeared in the Disney Channel sitcom A.N.T. Farm.
- George Foreman, boxer, lived in Kingwood for many years and still owns a house in the Foster's Mill neighborhood.
- Phil Garner, former player and later manager of the Houston Astros.
- Renee Olstead, singer, actress, and therapist
- Josh Pastner, head men's basketball coach, UNLV
- Charlie Sifford, golfer, first African American to play on the PGA Tour.
- Masyn Winn, MLB player for the St. Louis Cardinals.
- Unspeakable, Minecraft YouTuber
