= Kingwood Park High School =

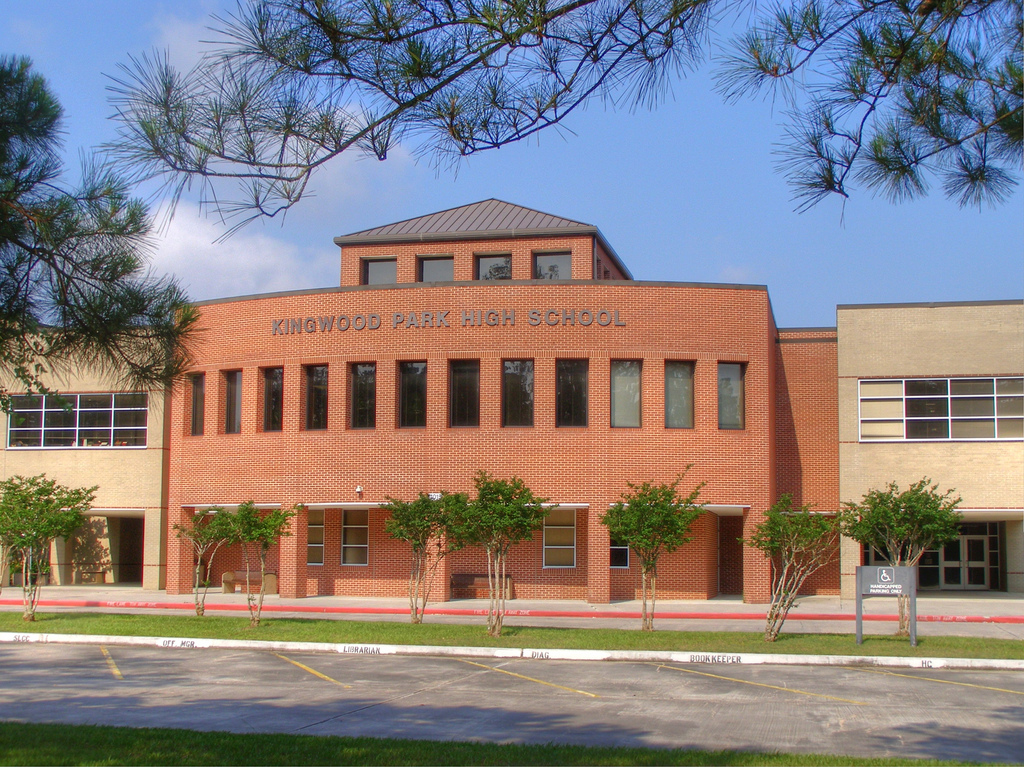

Location
- 4015 Woodland Hills Drive, Kingwood, TX; Houston, Texas 77339; United States; 30.0727684°N 95.21252759999999°W

Information
- Funding type: Public
- Opened: 2007
- Principal: Wes Solomon
- Teaching staff: 129.26 FTE
- Grades: 9-12
- Enrollment: 1,896 (2023-2024)
- Student to teacher ratio: 14.67
- Colors: Forest green, silver, and black
- Mascot: Panther
- Nickname: The Park
- Rivals: Porter High School
- Website: www.humbleisd.net/kphs

Kingwood Park High School (K-Park) is a high school located within the Kingwood community of Houston, Texas, United States. Kingwood Park is a part of the Humble Independent School District. On average, Kingwood Park serves approximately 1,700 students.

In 2008 the school was classified as a 4A school and reclassified in 2014 as a 5A school, putting it in District 21-5A. The school's mascot is the black panther, and its colors are silver, forest green and black. In December 2011, Larry Cooper retired from being principal of Kingwood Park High School. The current principal is Wes Solomon.

== History ==
Before the school was built, Humble ISD board members agreed to scale down the building's design. The school was scheduled to allow other Humble ISD students who wish to attend a high school smaller than the ones they are zoned to transfer to KPHS.

== Location and features ==
The school is located at 4015 Woodland Hills Drive, the former location of the Kingwood High School Ninth Grade Campus. The building was expanded to include a new gymnasium, a $25 million natatorium, auditorium, dance practice rooms, a wrestling arena, multi-purpose rooms, two large group instruction rooms, new state-of-the-art classrooms, and expanded administrative offices.

The school's campus is bisected by the Harris County, Texas / Montgomery County, Texas line. The campus lies partially in both counties.

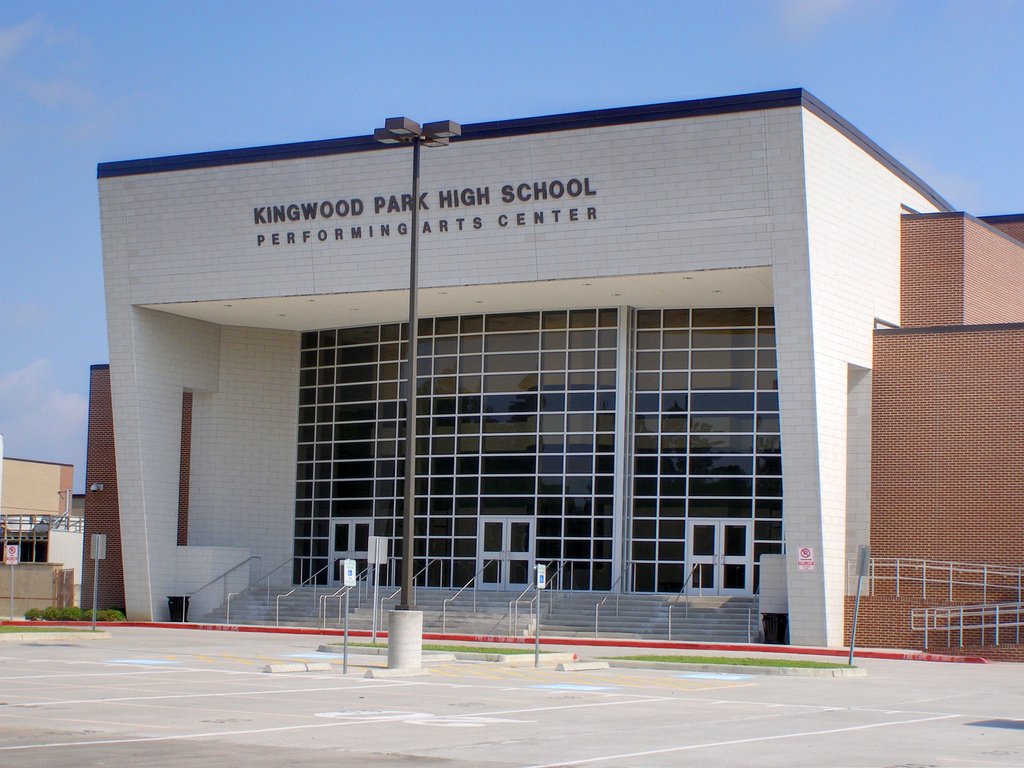
Kingwood Park High School Performing Arts Center

== Academics ==
For the 2018–2019 school year, the school received a B grade from the Texas Education Agency, with an overall score of 89 out of 100. The school received a B grade in two domains, School Progress (score of 82) and Closing the Gaps (score of 81), and an A grade in Student Achievement (score of 93). The school received one of the seven possible distinction designations for Academic Achievement in Science.

== Athletics ==
Initially, the school competed in athletic division 3A now 5A. The current Athletic Director for Kingwood Park is Clayton Maple who took over in 2015.

=== Swim and Dive ===
The boys' swim team won state championships in 2009, 2010, 2011, and 2015.

=== Football ===
The Kingwood Park football team has made playoffs in 2022, 2019, 2018, 2017, 2013, 2011, and 2010. They have not made it past the second round since the 2010 season. Notable Alumni within the program include Jaylon Henderson, Jordan Feuerbacher, Brady Cooper, Caleb Lewallen, and Rashad Scott.

=== Baseball ===
The baseball team has made the University Interscholastic League playoffs every year except for the 2022 season. The most notable playoff run was in 2018 when Kingwood Park was defeated in the 5A semi-finals in an extra-inning 3-2 loss against V.R. Eaton High School. Kingwood Park baseball was also famously known for playing Santa Fe after the Santa Fe High School shooting and was the first community event since the tragic event. Notable Alumni include current Major League Baseball Jason Blanchard. Over 20 players within the program have participated in college baseball.

=== Softball ===
The softball team has made playoffs in the 2022, 2019, 2018, 2017, 2016, 2015, and 2014. The most successful playoff feat was in 2022 when defeated by Santa Fe High School, a final score of 9-0, and in the quarterfinals of the 5A University Interscholastic League softball playoffs.

== Feeder schools ==
Elm Grove, Foster, Woodland Hills and Bear Branch elementary schools feed students into Kingwood Middle School. Kingwood Middle School and parts of Creekwood Middle School feeds into Kingwood Park High School.

== Notable alumni ==
- Jaylon Henderson, professional football player
- Patrick Overmyer, college football tight end for the Houston Cougars
