= List of United States tornadoes from January to February 1983 =

In January 1983, 13 tornadoes were reported in the United States, with two fatalities occurring in Louisiana and a total of $11.325 million (1983 USD) in damage being reported. In February 1983, 41 tornadoes were reported in the United States with one fatality occurring in Florida and a total of $17.833 million (1983 USD) in damage being reported.

Color/symbol key
Color / symbol	Description
†	Data from Grazulis 1990/1993/2001b
¶	Data from a local National Weather Service office
※	Data from the 1983 Storm Data publication
‡	Data from the NCEI database
♯	Maximum width of tornado
±	Tornado was rated below F2 intensity by Grazulis but a specific rating is unavailable.

Prior to 1990, there is a likely undercount of tornadoes, particularly E/F0–1, with reports of weaker tornadoes becoming more common as population increased. A sharp increase in the annual average E/F0–1 count by approximately 200 tornadoes was noted upon the implementation of NEXRAD Doppler weather radar in 1990–1991. (Note: Historically, the number of tornadoes globally and in the United States was and is likely underrepresented: research by Grazulis on annual tornado activity suggests that, as of 2001, only 53% of yearly U.S. tornadoes were officially recorded. Documentation of tornadoes outside the United States was historically less exhaustive, owing to the lack of monitors in many nations and, in some cases, to internal political controls on public information. Most countries only recorded tornadoes that produced severe damage or loss of life. Significant low biases in U.S. tornado counts likely occurred through the early 1990s, when advanced NEXRAD was first installed and the National Weather Service began comprehensively verifying tornado occurrences.) 1974 marked the first year where significant tornado (E/F2+) counts became homogenous with contemporary values, attributed to the consistent implementation of Fujita scale assessments. (Note: The Fujita scale was devised under the aegis of scientist T. Theodore Fujita in the early 1970s. Prior to the advent of the scale in 1971, tornadoes in the United States were officially unrated. Tornado ratings were retroactively applied to events prior to the formal adoption of the F-scale by the National Weather Service. While the Fujita scale has been superseded by the Enhanced Fujita scale in the U.S. since February 1, 2007, Canada used the old scale until April 1, 2013; nations elsewhere, like the United Kingdom, apply other classifications such as the TORRO scale.) Numerous discrepancies on the details of tornadoes in this outbreak exist between sources. The total count of tornadoes and ratings differs from various agencies accordingly. The list below documents information from the most contemporary official sources alongside assessments from tornado historian Thomas P. Grazulis.

== January ==
Confirmed tornadoes by Fujita rating
FU	F0	F1	F2	F3	F4	F5	Total
0	0	6	7	0	0	0	13

=== January 29 event ===
List of confirmed tornadoes — Saturday, January 29, 1983 (Note: All dates are based on the local time zone where the tornado touched down; however, all times are in Coordinated Universal Time for consistency.)
F#	Location	County / Parish	State	Start Coord. (Note: All starting coordinates are based on the NCEI database and may not reflect contemporary analyses)	Time (UTC)	Path length	Width (Note: The listed width values are primarily the average/mean width of the tornadoes, with those having known maximum widths denoted by ♯. From 1952 to 1994, reports largely list mean width whereas contemporary years list maximum width. Values provided by Grazulis are the average width, with estimates being rounded down (i.e. 0.5 mi (0.80 km) is rounded down from 880 yards to 800 yards.)	Damage (Note: The National Oceanic and Atmospheric Administration's Storm Data publication does not list exact damage totals for every event, instead giving damage categories. As such, damage for individual tornadoes is not comprehensive.)
F1	Panama City Beach	Bay	FL	30.18°N 85.80°W	04:15–?	0.7 mi (1.1 km)	30 yd (27 m)	$2,500,000
F1	A waterspout moved ashore and demolished 47 mobile homes. The tornado overturned 25 boats, ripped roofs off multiple homes, and downed numerous trees and power lines.							

=== January 31 event ===
List of confirmed tornadoes — Monday, January 31, 1983
F#	Location	County / Parish	State	Start Coord.	Time (UTC)	Path length	Width	Damage
F1	Spanish Camp to NW of Hungerford※	Wharton	TX	29.40°N 96.17°W	15:30–?	5 mi (8.0 km)	60 yd (55 m)	$250,000
F1	An F1 tornado wrecked a spacious tin barn, destroying a boat, truck, and camper stored inside. A pump house and a garage received minimal damage. Another barn was destroyed as well. The National Centers for Environmental Information incorrectly list the path as starting north of Spanish Camp, west of Hungerford.							
F1	S of Tamina to N of Chateau Woods※	Montgomery	TX	30.17°N 95.43°W	16:00–?	2.5 mi (4.0 km)※	40 yd (37 m)	$2,500,000
F1	An F1 tornado lofted tree limbs and stones, thereby shattering windows in, and damaging roofing and doors of, 51 businesses and homes, 29 of which incurred heavy damage. Fencing and trees were pulled out of the ground as well.							
F2	Sealy	Austin	TX	29.78°N 96.13°W	16:15–?	3 mi (4.8 km)	60 yd (55 m)	$2,500,000
F2	Various outbuildings, a mobile home, many barns, and three homes were wrecked. Trees were downed as well. Four people were injured.							
F1	W of Clute※	Brazoria	TX	29.02°N 95.95°W	19:07–?	1 mi (1.6 km)	20 yd (18 m)	$250,000
F1	Eight homes were destroyed or damaged. The NCEI wrongly said this tornado occurred north of Bay City in Matagorda County, Texas.							
F2†	Beaumont	Jefferson	TX	30.08°N 94.18°W	20:00–?	1 mi (1.6 km)	40 yd (37 m)	$2,500,000
F2†	An extremely brief but strong tornado struck a 100-unit pair of apartment complexes in Beaumont, destroying or damaging a total of about half the units. A person was injured in one of the apartments. Chimneys and roofing were damaged as well.							
F1	Between Holly Beach and Johnson Bayou	Cameron	LA	29.77°N 93.60°W	23:41–?	1 mi (1.6 km)‡	20 yd (18 m)‡	$30
F1	A brief F1 tornado was observed near the Sabine National Wildlife Refuge.							
F2±	Vidrine to NW of Ville Platte※	Evangeline※	LA	30.72°N 92.37°W	00:00–?	3 mi (4.8 km)	50 yd (46 m)	$250,000
F2±	A strong tornado wrecked 15 fishing camps on Millers Lake. Trees, fencing, and a barn were wrecked at Vidrine. The NCEI incorrectly list the parish as East Feliciana.							
F1	Westlake※	Calcasieu	LA	30.23°N 93.23°W	01:30–?	1 mi (1.6 km)	50 yd (46 m)	$25,000
F1	Power lines, trees, roofs, and windows were damaged just west of Lake Charles.							
F2†	Leleux※	Vermilion	LA	30.02°N 92.27°W	03:00–?	6 mi (9.7 km)	100 yd (91 m)	$250,000
F2†	1 death — One home was destroyed and a few others negligibly damaged. Three people were injured. At least two other tornadoes struck Kaplan while this event was in progress, but were not rated by the National Weather Service.							
F2†	S of Bunkie※ to NNW of Evergreen	Avoyelles	LA	30.93°N 92.17°W	03:30–?	5 mi (8.0 km)	100 yd (91 m)	$250,000
F2†	1 death — A mobile home was destroyed and agricultural outbuildings damaged. Two people were injured.							
F2	E of Leonville to E of Port Barre	St. Landry	LA	30.47°N 91.93°W	04:15–?	7 mi (11 km)	100 yd (91 m)	$25,000
F2	Sheds, a pair of trailers, and numerous barns were destroyed.							
F2	Brusly	West Baton Rouge	LA	30.38°N 91.23°W	05:30–?	0.5 mi (0.80 km)‡	33 yd (30 m)‡	$25,000
F2	One home lost its roof and was destroyed. A few others received minor damage.							

== February ==
Confirmed tornadoes by Fujita rating
FU	F0	F1	F2	F3	F4	F5	Total
0	7	20	13	1	0	0	41

=== February 1 event ===
List of confirmed tornadoes — Tuesday, February 1, 1983
F#	Location	County / Parish	State	Start Coord.	Time (UTC)	Path length	Width	Damage
F1	SE of Hurley※	Jackson	MS	30.63°N 88.43°W	11:00–?	0.3 mi (0.48 km)	75 yd (69 m)※	$250,000
F1	A trailer was flipped, injuring three people.							
F0	Northwestern Mobile	Mobile	AL	30.72°N 88.17°W	11:30–?	4 mi (6.4 km)	150 yd (140 m)	$25,000
F0	Six homes, power lines, and a few buildings at a shopping center were damaged, mostly by fallen trees. Airborne glass damaged automobiles and caused a minor injury.							
F1	Warrington to western Pensacola※	Escambia	FL	30.38°N 87.27°W	13:45–?	5 mi (8.0 km)	40 yd (37 m)	$250,000
F1	A tornado tipped over traffic barriers, knocked down traffic lights, and damaged trees, power lines, and roofing. One person was injured.							
F0	E of Pensacola Beach※	Santa Rosa	FL	30.33°N 87.15°W	14:10–?	0.5 mi (0.80 km)	20 yd (18 m)	$250
F0	Damage was mainly limited to broken tree limbs, though an automobile was flipped as well.							
F1	Auburn	Okaloosa	FL	30.82°N 86.55°W	14:30–?	0.4 mi (0.64 km)	20 yd (18 m)	$25,000
F1	The concrete base of a 60-foot-tall (18 m) metal television antenna was uplifted and the tower itself felled. Nearby barns and sheds were flattened as well.							
F2±	New Harmony	Walton	FL	30.85°N 86.28°W	15:30–?	0.3 mi (0.48 km)	30 yd (27 m)	$25,000
F2±	A mobile home was torn off its CBU foundation and overturned, severely injuring its occupant.							

=== February 2 event ===
List of confirmed tornadoes — Wednesday, February 2, 1983
F#	Location	County / Parish	State	Start Coord.	Time (UTC)	Path length	Width	Damage
F1	Pine Island	Hernando	FL	28.57°N 82.65°W	09:30–?	1 mi (1.6 km)	20 yd (18 m)	$25,000
F1	A trailer was destroyed and several permanent residences damaged. Trees were downed as well.							
F1	Floral City	Citrus	FL	28.75°N 82.28°W	09:45–?	2 mi (3.2 km)	30 yd (27 m)	$25,000
F1	Rural trees, mobile homes, power lines, and signage were damaged. One person was injured.							
F2	Shiloh to Micanopy※	Marion※, Alachua	FL	29.52°N 82.27°W	10:40–?	0.3 mi (0.48 km)	20 yd (18 m)	$250,000
F2	Five mobile homes were destroyed and a number of frame homes unroofed. Four injuries were reported, three of them serious.							
F1	St. Petersburg	Pinellas	FL	27.77°N 82.67°W	11:00–?	0.6 mi (0.97 km)	40 yd (37 m)	$250,000
F1	20 businesses, four homes, power lines, and trees were damaged. Windows were smashed as well. One person was mildly injured.							
F1	Barberville	Volusia	FL	29.18°N 81.43°W	11:30–?	0.2 mi (0.32 km)	10 yd (9.1 m)	$2,500
F1	A home sustained damage, mostly to roofing and a window, and trees and sheds were felled.							
F2±	SW of Dover to NW of Plant City	Hillsborough	FL	27.98°N 82.22°W	11:50–?	4 mi (6.4 km)	40 yd (37 m)	$250,000
F2±	25 trailers were damaged to varying degrees. Trees and signs were downed and windows shattered.							
F1	Arcadia	De Soto	FL	27.22°N 81.87°W	13:20–?	0.5 mi (0.80 km)	30 yd (27 m)	$2,500
F1	A shed was wrecked and a roof blown off. Trees were affected nearby.							
F1	New Smyrna Beach	Volusia	FL	29.02°N 80.93°W	13:40–?	2 mi (3.2 km)	50 yd (46 m)	$250,000
F1	A 2-tonne (2,000 kg) air compressor was blown off the roof of a condominium, and a fallen tree penetrated the roof of a home. A nearby marina and watercraft were extensively damaged. Trees were felled and mobile homes tipped onto their sides.							
F2	Northern Orlando※	Orange	FL	28.55°N 81.37°W	13:45–?	1 mi (1.6 km)	20 yd (18 m)	$250,000
F2	A few homes were destroyed. Trees, power lines, and signage were downed.							
F0	Winter Park	Orange	FL	28.60°N 81.33°W	14:00–?	0.2 mi (0.32 km)	20 yd (18 m)	$250
F0	Little billboards and signs were toppled, landing on automobiles below. Power lines and trees were also damaged.							
F2	Southeastern Orlando※	Orange	FL	28.55°N 81.37°W	14:05–?	5 mi (8.0 km)	50 yd (46 m)	$2,500,000
F2	This tornado impacted a sprawling apartment complex, wrecking eight units and damaging 56 others. Nine people were injured at the complex. Additionally, 15 frame homes were partly or wholly unroofed.							
F2	DeSoto City	Highlands	FL	27.45°N 81.40°W	14:20–?	1 mi (1.6 km)	40 yd (37 m)	$250,000
F2	1 death – 36 trailers were destroyed or damaged and a pair of frame homes unroofed. A vehicle was also damaged.							
F1	Southern Rockledge※	Brevard	FL	28.25°N 80.72°W	15:48–?	0.4 mi (0.64 km)	30 yd (27 m)	$25,000
F1	The roof of an automobile repair shop was damaged. The NCEI list the touchdown as near Viera.							
F2	Jensen Beach	Martin	FL	27.25°N 80.23°W	18:20–?	2 mi (3.2 km)	50 yd (46 m)	$250,000
F2	A number of trailers were destroyed and a frame home shorn of its roof. 14 other trailers received damage. One person was injured.							

=== February 5 event ===
List of confirmed tornadoes — Saturday, February 5, 1983
F#	Location	County / Parish	State	Start Coord.	Time (UTC)	Path length	Width	Damage
F0	Brusly	West Baton Rouge	LA	30.38°N 91.23°W	02:30	1 mi (1.6 km)	50 yd (46 m)	$25,000
F0	A small, weak tornado impacted the Live Oak subdivision, which caused severe roof damage to two homes with numerous trees and fences destroyed. This was the second tornado to hit Brusly in just five days.							

=== February 9 event ===
List of confirmed tornadoes — Wednesday, February 9, 1983
F#	Location	County / Parish	State	Start Coord.	Time (UTC)	Path length	Width (Note: The listed width values are primarily the average/mean width of the tornadoes, with those having known maximum widths denoted by ♯. From 1952 to 1994, reports largely list mean width whereas contemporary years list maximum width. Values provided by Grazulis are the average width, with estimates being rounded down (i.e. 0.5 mi (0.80 km) is rounded down from 880 yards to 800 yards.)	Damage
F1	New Waverly	Walker	TX	30.53°N 95.50°W	18:30–?	2 mi (3.2 km)	40 yd (37 m)	$250,000
F1	A hay-filled barn was uplifted, bits of which were thrown 200 yd (180 m).							
F2±	Southwestern Houston	Harris	TX	29.65°N 95.45°W	19:30–?	1.5 mi (2.4 km)	50 yd (46 m)	$250,000
F2±	A carport was damaged, along with four warehouses, three of which were unroofed. Three injuries were reported.							
F1	Pasadena※	Harris	TX	29.70°N 95.03°W	19:50–?	1 mi (1.6 km)	20 yd (18 m)	$250,000
F1	A few trailers, fences, roofs, traffic lights, and a utility pole were damaged.							
F1	Northern Houston※	Harris	TX	29.70°N 95.27°W	20:10–?	1 mi (1.6 km)	20 yd (18 m)	$25,000
F1	This tornado flattened a carport and damaged a garage.							
F0	Western Huntsville	Walker	TX	30.72°N 95.62°W	20:15–?	0.5 mi (0.80 km)	20 yd (18 m)	Unknown
F0	A tornado developed over agricultural land, doing no known structural damage.							
F1	Coldspring	San Jacinto	TX	30.60°N 95.12°W	20:20–?	0.5 mi (0.80 km)	30 yd (27 m)	$250,000
F1	This tornado caused fallen utility poles and trees to land on a house. Billboards were shredded as well, and the tornado also traversed Texas State Highway 156.							
F2±	N of Manvel to near Pearland※	Brazoria	TX	29.48°N 95.35°W	20:25–?	8 mi (13 km)	50 yd (46 m)	$25,000
F2±	Trees and a few carports were torn apart.							
F2†	SE of Eunice	Acadia	LA	30.43°N 92.33°W	23:30–?	3 mi (4.8 km)	150 yd (140 m)	$250,000
F2†	This tornado affected the Richard–Hundley area, almost leveling a small home.							
F3	E of Church Point to NNE of Courtableau	Acadia, St. Landry	LA	30.40°N 92.18°W	23:45–?	21 mi (34 km)	150 yd (140 m)	$2,500,000※
F3	This was a multiple-vortex tornado. A church, a grain elevator, and at least seven homes were demolished. Seven people were injured.							

=== February 10 event ===
List of confirmed tornadoes — Thursday, February 10, 1983
F#	Location	County / Parish	State	Start Coord.	Time (UTC)	Path length	Width	Damage
F0	Southwestern Miami	Dade	FL	25.65°N 80.43°W	21:45–?	0.5 mi (0.80 km)	20 yd (18 m)	$30
F0	This tornado caused window damage, felled trees, and downed power lines.							
F0	Western Hollywood※	Broward	FL	26.13°N 80.13°W	22:00–?	0.5 mi (0.80 km)	20 yd (18 m)	$25,000
F0	Coincident with golf ball-sized hail, this tornado damaged roofing and trees.							
F1	West Palm Beach※	Palm Beach	FL	26.68°N 80.13°W	22:42–?	2 mi (3.2 km)	40 yd (37 m)	$2,500
F1	Power lines, fencing, and screened pool enclosures were knocked down. Trees were felled as well.							

=== February 22 event ===
List of confirmed tornadoes — Tuesday, February 22, 1983
F#	Location	County / Parish	State	Start Coord.	Time (UTC)	Path length	Width	Damage
F2	Manchester to S of Arley	Walker, Winston	AL	33.90°N 87.30°W	19:15–?	8 mi (13 km)	100 yd (91 m)†	$250,000
F2	Possibly multiple-vortex, this tornado produced scattered, mainly light damage, destroying or damaging chicken coops and sheds. It felled trees as well, along with a boathouse. Many other boathouses, boats, and automobiles were damaged, along with 14 homes. Most losses were tied to fallen trees near Lewis Smith Lake.							
F2	Hanceville	Cullman	AL	34.07°N 86.77°W	20:05–?	1.5 mi (2.4 km)	60 yd (55 m)※	$250,000
F2	Buildings sustained damage to their roofs and interiors. An automobile was tossed on top of a pickup truck, and half a dozen vehicles were damaged. A brick church was unroofed and destroyed as well. Unusually for Alabama, the tornado was photographed, along with two others in the state this day.							
F1	White City※	Cullman	AL	34.08°N 86.77°W	20:15–?	1 mi (1.6 km)	40 yd (37 m)	$25,000
F1	Trees were downed and a mobile home was wrecked.							
F1	Fitzgerald	Ben Hill	GA	31.72°N 83.25°W	20:45–?	2.5 mi (4.0 km)	50 yd (46 m)	$250,000
F1	A doctor's office, bleachers at a pair of ballparks, a store, and 20 homes were damaged. Fallen trees damaged roofs as well.							
F2	Albertville	Marshall	AL	34.27°N 86.22°W	21:28–?	2.2 mi (3.5 km)	440 yd (400 m)	$2,500,000
F2	15 mobile homes were heavily damaged or destroyed, along with 17 other structures, four homes, a chicken coop, and a business. Three schools were damaged as well. Most of the damage was to mobile homes. A few people were injured in a trailer.							
F1	NW of Alma	Bacon	GA	31.57°N 82.50°W	23:05–?	2 mi (3.2 km)	20 yd (18 m)※	$25,000
F1	A roof was dislodged, a boat damaged, and a barn wrecked. Trees were felled as well.							
F1	E of Alma	Bacon	GA	31.53°N 82.45°W	23:05–?	4 mi (6.4 km)	30 yd (27 m)※	$250,000
F1	Four mobile homes and a barn were wrecked. Three injuries occurred.							

=== February 27 event ===
List of confirmed tornadoes — Sunday, February 27, 1983
F#	Location	County / Parish	State	Start Coord.	Time (UTC)	Path length	Width	Damage
F1	N of Santa Rosa※	Sonoma	CA	38.45°N 122.70°W	13:20–?	0.75 mi (1.21 km)※	300 yd (270 m)※	$250,000※
F1	On Oakhaven Court one home’s roof was ripped off and two other homes lost some of their roof shingles. Losses may have totaled $1 million.							

== See also ==
- Tornadoes of 1983

== Sources ==
- Agee, Ernest M.; Childs, Samuel (June 1, 2014). "Adjustments in Tornado Counts, F-Scale Intensity, and Path Width for Assessing Significant Tornado Destruction". Journal of Applied Meteorology and Climatology. 53 (6). American Meteorological Society: 1494–1505. Bibcode:2014JApMC..53.1494A. doi:10.1175/JAMC-D-13-0235.1.
- Brooks, Harold E. (April 2004). "On the Relationship of Tornado Path Length and Width to Intensity". Weather and Forecasting. 19 (2): 310–19. Bibcode:2004WtFor..19..310B. doi:10.1175/1520-0434(2004)019<0310:OTROTP>2.0.CO;2.
- Cook, A. R.; Schaefer, J. T. (August 2008). "The Relation of El Niño–Southern Oscillation (ENSO) to Winter Tornado Outbreaks". Monthly Weather Review. 136 (8): 3121–3137. Bibcode:2008MWRv..136.3121C. doi:10.1175/2007MWR2171.1.
- Edwards, Roger; LaDue, James G.; Ferree, John T.; Scharfenberg, Kevin; Maier, Chris; Coulbourne, William L. (May 1, 2013). "Tornado Intensity Estimation: Past, Present, and Future". Bulletin of the American Meteorological Society. 94 (5). American Meteorological Society: 641–653. Bibcode:2013BAMS...94..641E. doi:10.1175/BAMS-D-11-00006.1.
- Grazulis, Thomas P. (May 1984). Violent Tornado Climatography, 1880–1982. OSTI (Technical report). NUREG. Washington, D.C.: Nuclear Regulatory Commission. OSTI 7099491. CR-3670.
  - — (November 1990). Significant Tornadoes 1880–1989. Vol. 2. St. Johnsbury, Vermont: The Tornado Project of Environmental Films. ISBN 1-879362-02-3.
  - — (July 1993). Significant Tornadoes 1680–1991: A Chronology and Analysis of Events. St. Johnsbury, Vermont: The Tornado Project of Environmental Films. ISBN 1-879362-03-1.
  - — (2001a). The Tornado: Nature's Ultimate Windstorm. Norman: University of Oklahoma Press. ISBN 978-0-8061-3538-0.
  - — (2001b). F5-F6 Tornadoes. St. Johnsbury, Vermont: The Tornado Project of Environmental Films.
- National Weather Service (January–February 1983). Storm Data Publication (Report). National Centers for Environmental Information – via Storm Events Database.
- National Weather Service (January 1983). "Storm Data and Unusual Weather Phenomena". Storm Data. 25 (1). Asheville, North Carolina: National Climatic Data Center.
- National Weather Service (February 1983). "Storm Data and Unusual Weather Phenomena". Storm Data. 25 (2). Asheville, North Carolina: National Climatic Data Center.
