= Grand Oaks High School =

Public high school in Texas, United States

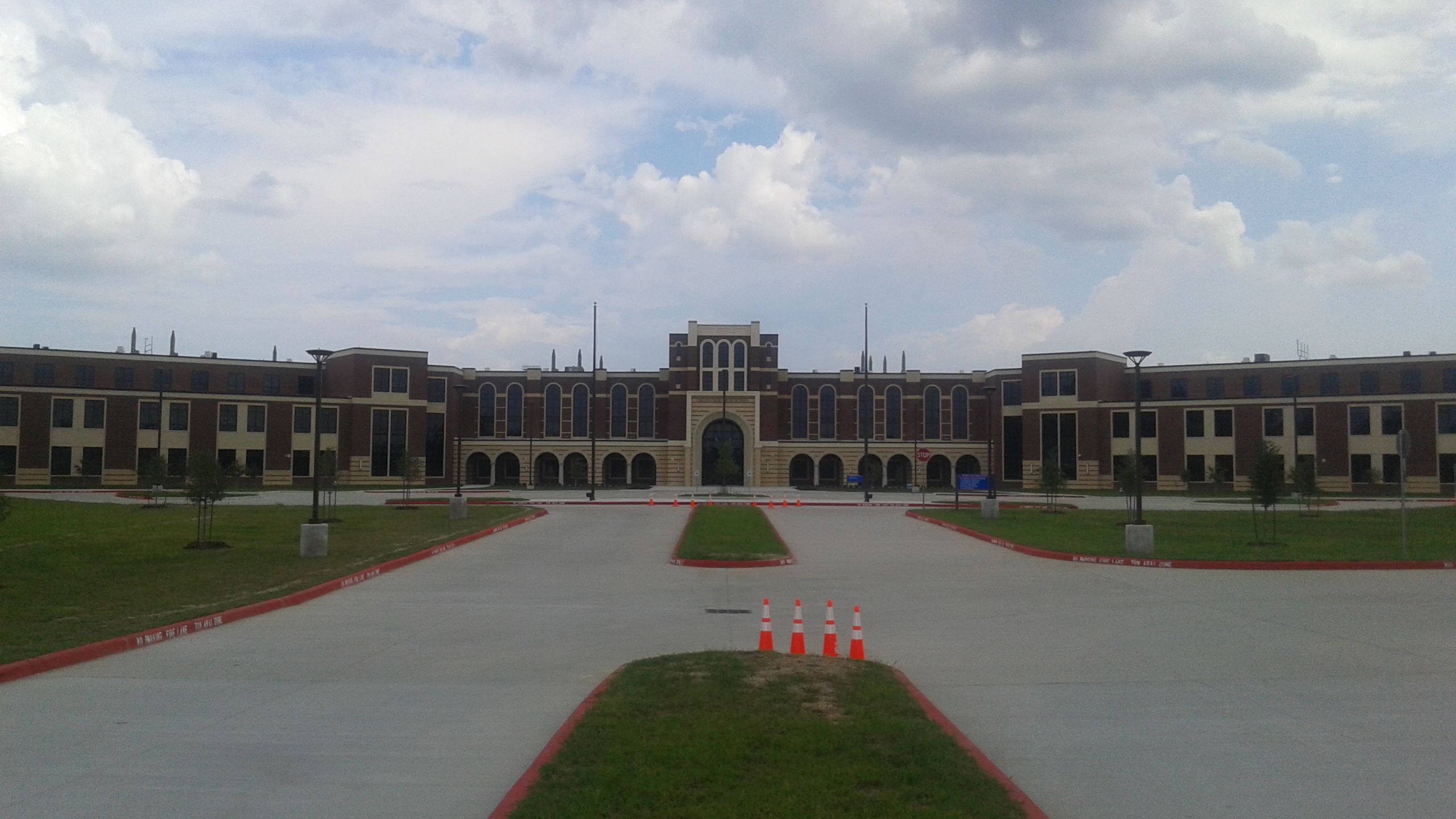

Location
- 4800 Riley Fuzzel Road; Spring, Texas 77386; United States; 30.12376330000001°N 95.36454479999998°W

Information
- School type: Public high school
- Established: 2018
- School district: Conroe Independent School District
- Principal: Dr. Frederick Black, Jr.
- Teaching staff: 210.71 (FTE)
- Grades: 9–12
- Enrollment: 3,836 (2024-2025)
- Student to teacher ratio: 18.21
- Campus: Rural: Fringe
- Colors: Orange & Royal Blue
- Athletics conference: UIL Class 6A
- Mascot: Grizzlies
- Website: Grand Oaks High School

Grand Oaks High School is a high school in unincorporated Montgomery County, Texas, in the United States. The school opened in August 2018 as the sixth high school within Conroe Independent School District. The school was built to alleviate overcrowding at Oak Ridge High School.

== Demographics ==
The school enrolled 1,241 students in 9th and 10th grade in its first year. The school's capacity is approximately 3,000 students.

== History ==
On November 3, 2015, voters within Conroe ISD's attendance zone voted in favor of a $487 million bond. Part of the bond package included the construction of a high school within the Oak Ridge High School feeder zone. The new high school was included to reduce enrollment at Oak Ridge High School. In the 2016–2017 school year, Oak Ridge enrolled 4,119 students, while the school district listed the school capacity as 3,650. Due to the opening of Grand Oaks High School, the district estimated that enrollment at Oak Ridge would drop to 2,270 by the year 2020.

The Grand Oaks campus had a cost of $154 million. In its first year, Grand Oaks enrolled only 9th and 10th grade students. Each subsequent year, the school added one grade to the campus, graduating its first class in 2021.

The dedication ceremony occurred on October 22, 2018.

== Academics ==
Grand Oaks has received a B grade from the Texas Education Agency every school year from 2021-2022 through 2024-2025.

== Athletics ==
In its inaugural year, Grand Oaks competed in UIL class 5A in individual sports such as cross country, track, tennis, wrestling, and swimming. All team sports except football became varsity sports in 2019; football started competing at the varsity level in 2020.

=== State Titles ===
- Volleyball
  - 2024 (6A/D1)

== Feeder schools ==
Feeder elementary schools (K-4) to Grand Oaks High School include:

- Bradley
- Birnham Woods
- Snyder
- Broadway
- Ford (Fox Run & Spring Creek Pines only)
- Hines

Feeder intermediate schools (5-6) to Grand Oaks High School include:

- Clark
- Cox

Feeder junior high schools (7-8) to Grand Oaks High School include:

- York
