= Oak Ridge High School (Montgomery County, Texas) =

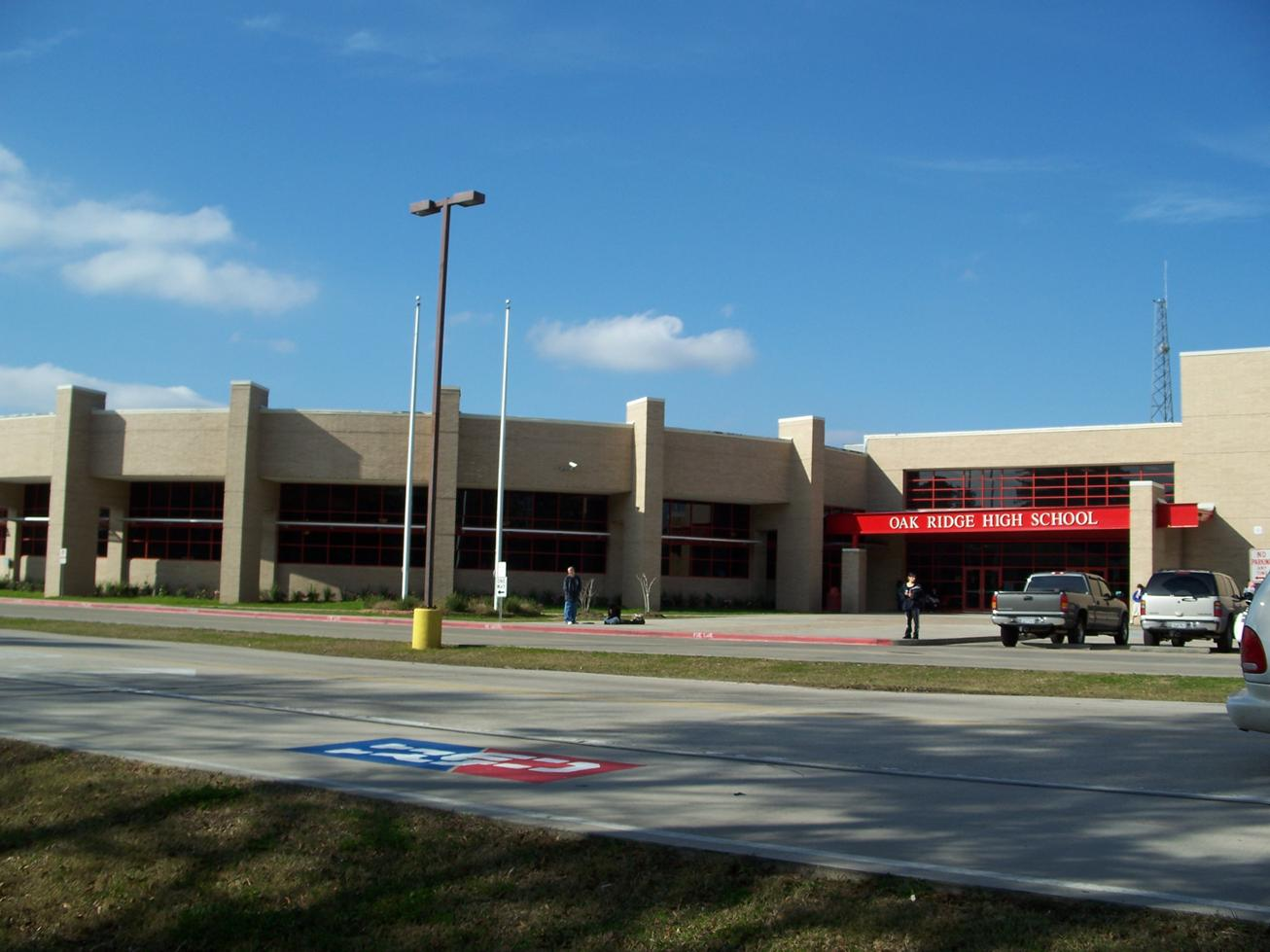

Location
- 27330 Oak Ridge School Road; Conroe, Texas 77385; United States; 30.17111°N 95.44339°W

Information
- School type: Secondary
- Established: 1981
- School district: Conroe Independent School District
- Principal: Nina Norman
- Teaching staff: 170.55 (on an FTE basis)
- Grades: 9–12
- Enrollment: 2,705 (2023-2024)
- Student to teacher ratio: 15.86
- Colors: Red, white and blue
- Mascot: War Eagles
- Website: http://orhs.conroeisd.net/

Oak Ridge High School is a secondary school in unincorporated Montgomery County, Texas, near Conroe, and within the extraterritorial jurisdiction of Shenandoah. Built in 1981, Oak Ridge High School is classified as a 6A school in the Conroe Independent School District. In 2021–2022, the school received a B grade from the Texas Education Agency.

The school serves: the city of Oak Ridge North, portions of the City of Shenandoah, the town of Woodloch, and the unincorporated communities of Imperial Oaks and Tamina. It also includes the former city of Chateau Woods. The school has two campuses: The main campus for students in grades 10–12 and a 9th grade campus on an adjacent property.

Oak Ridge High School housed the Conroe ISD Academy of Science and Technology, a science and technology based magnet program, from 1987 until the end of the 2007 school year when the program was transferred to The Woodlands College Park High School. The Academy for Careers in Engineering and Science, which opened in 2018–2019, operates inside an office on the main campus. Oak Ridge also supports an Air Force JROTC program.

== History ==
The Conroe ISD Academy of Science and Technology opened inside of Oak Ridge High School in 1987. The academy began moving students to the newly opened The Woodlands College Park High School in the fall of 2005 to accommodate the expected growth in students attending Oak Ridge from its attendance zone. The academy gradually transitioned from Oak Ridge to College Park from fall 2005 to spring 2007, allowing students already enrolled in the program at Oak Ridge in 2003–2004 to remain.

By 2015, the school's enrollment exceeded its capacity. The combined, 9-12 enrollment of the school was 3,768. To accommodate the school's population growth, the district allocated 24 portable classroom buildings for the main campus and 4 portables for the 9th grade campus. In 2018, the district estimated the school's capacity to be 3,650.

For the 2017–2018 school year, the Oak Ridge High student population had increased to 4,400. Grand Oaks High School, which opened in August 2018, reduced the size of Oak Ridge's attendance zone. Due to the opening of Grand Oaks High School, the district estimated that enrollment at Oak Ridge will drop to 2,270 by the year 2020.

Conroe ISD opened its 3rd STEM academy, the Academy for Careers in Engineering and Science, inside the Oak Ridge 9th grade campus at the beginning of the 2018–2019 school year. It then expanded after changing leadership with an ACES office within the main campus.

== Demographics ==
In the 2022–2023 school year, there were 2,672 students enrolled at Oak Ridge High School. The ethnic distribution of students was as follows:

- 39.0% White
- 36.6% Hispanic
- 15.2% African American
- 4.9% Asian
- 0.2% American Indian
- 0.0% Pacific Islander
- 4.1% Two or more races

42% of students were eligible for free or reduced-cost lunch.

== Academics ==
For each school year, the Texas Education Agency rates school performance using an A–F grading system based on statistical data. For 2021–2022, the school received a score of 85 out of 100, resulting in a B grade. Schools were not rated in 2019–2020 or 2020–2021 due to the COVID-19 pandemic. The school received a score of 89 in 2017–2018 and 2018–2019.

== Feeder schools ==
Feeder K–6 school(s) to Oak Ridge High School include:

- Suchma (excluding Stonecrest subdivision)

Feeder elementary school(s) to Oak Ridge High School include:

- Ford (excluding Fox Run & Spring Creek Pines)
- Houser
- Kaufman
- Oak Ridge

== Notable alumni ==
- Luken Baker, 2015 Gatorade Player of the Year, played collegiate baseball at TCU and drafted to the St. Louis Cardinals in the second round of the 2018 MLB draft
- Durbin Feltman, played collegiate baseball at TCU and was drafted by the Boston Red Sox in the third round of the 2018 MLB draft
- Nancilea Foster, diver who has won national championships and competed in women's springboard at the 2008 Summer Olympics in Beijing
- Joseph Jonah-Ajonye, college football defensive end for the Georgia Bulldogs
- Alton McCaskill, college football running back for the Houston Cougars, the Colorado Buffaloes, the Arizona State Sun Devils and the Sam Houston Bearkats
- Joseph Ossai, former college football defensive end for the Texas Longhorns, drafted in the third round of the 2021 NFL draft by the Cincinnati Bengals
- Grant Stuard, former college football linebacker for the Houston Cougars. Final pick in the 2021 NFL draft, making him that year's Mr. Irrelevant
- Justin Williams, college football linebacker for the Georgia Bulldogs
