= Conroe High School =

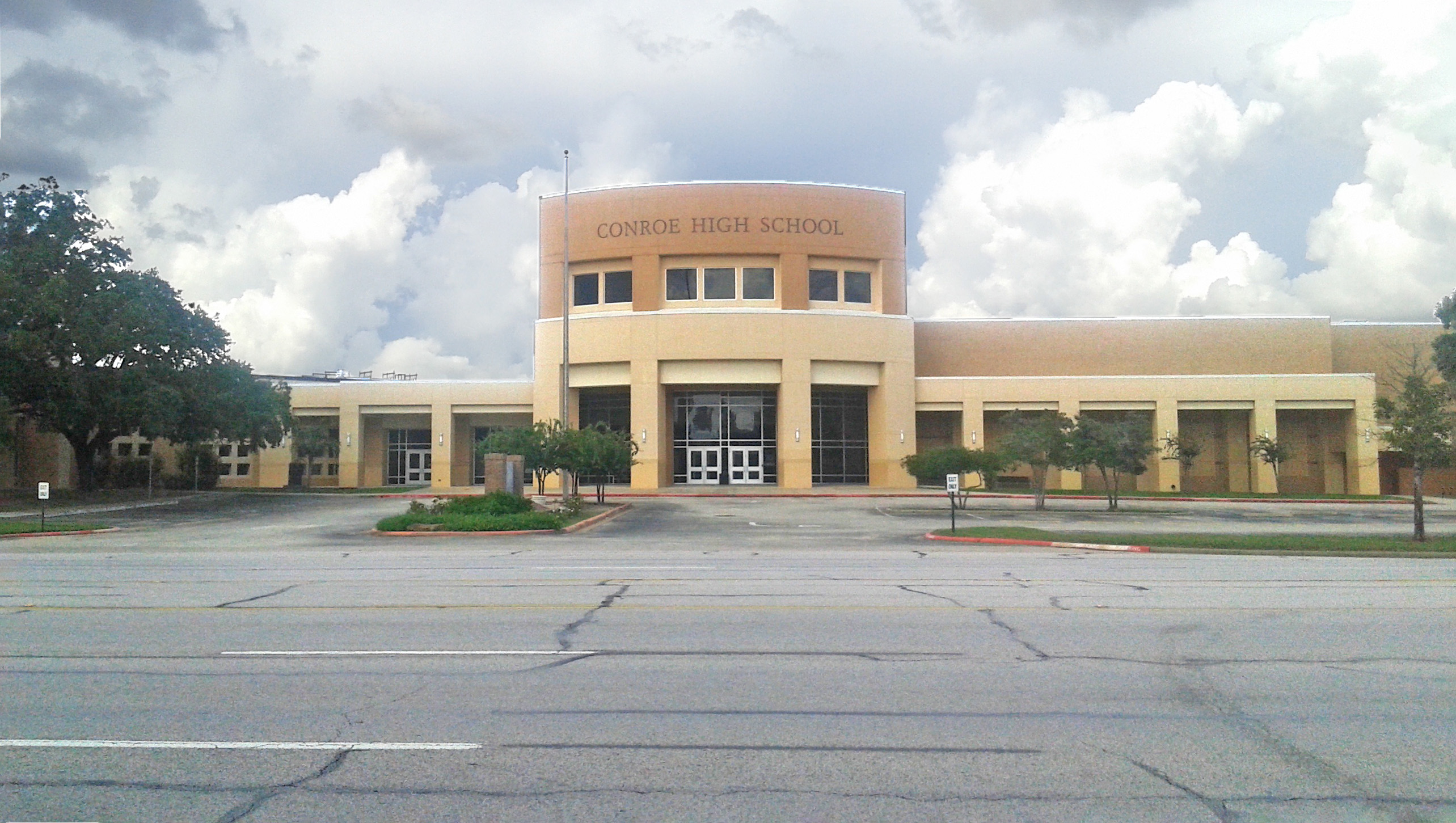

Location
- 3200 West Davis Street; Conroe, Texas 77304

Information
- School type: Public high school
- Motto: Pride and Unity
- Founded: 1964
- School district: Conroe Independent School District
- NCES School ID: 481500001002
- Principal: Rotasha Smith
- Faculty: 313.26 (on an FTE basis)
- Grades: 9–12
- Enrollment: 5,178 (2023–24) (combined attendance for the Grade 9 campus and the Grades 10–12 campus, since NCES considers them to be one school)
- Student to teacher ratio: 16.53
- Colors: Gold and white
- Athletics conference: UIL Class AAAAAA
- Mascot: Tiger
- Newspaper: The Triumph
- Website: chs.conroeisd.net

Conroe High School is a secondary school in Conroe, Texas. The school is a part of the Conroe Independent School District and serves most of the city of Conroe as well as portions of unincorporated Montgomery County, including the community of River Plantation. The current campus was built in 1964 to replace the older Davy Crockett High School as Conroe's primary high school. The campus has been updated, renovated and expanded through various bond measures, including in 2004, 2015, and 2019.

Also found at Conroe High School is the Academy for Science and Health Professions, a magnet program which enrolls students through an application process from the Conroe High School and Caney Creek High School attendance zones.

Beginning in the 2013–14 school year, Conroe High School's freshmen class attend school at the Conroe High School 9th Grade Campus.

== History ==
Various buildings have served as the public high school for the residents of Conroe and the surrounding area. Conroe Mill School opened in 1886 with a single classroom and educated students for five months each year. Conroe Public School was built in 1899 and served students in 10 grades. In 1902, the first four students received their high school diplomas. In 1911, Conroe's first brick school, the JOH Bennette School, was built. Davy Crockett High School, built in 1926, was also referred to as "Conroe High" by local residents. The current Conroe High School was built in 1964. From 1968–1969, Conroe High School was desegregated.

== Demographics ==
As of the 2023–2024 school year, CHS had 5,178 students enrolled.

- 54.3% were Hispanic
- 26.7% were White
- 12.7% were Black
- 2.2% were Asian
- 0.6% were American Indian or Alaskan Native
- 0.2% were Native Hawaiian or Pacific Islander
- 3.2% were part of Two or More races

61.0% of students were eligible for free or reduced-price lunch.

== Academics ==
At the beginning of each school year, the Texas Education Agency assigns schools a grade based on three different indices: Student Achievement, School Progress, and Closing the Gaps. For each index, schools are classified as "Met Standard" if they receive a grade of at least 60 out of 100. In 2018, Conroe High School received an overall score of 79 and was classified as "Met Standard." The school received scores of 81 in Student Achievement, 81 in School Progress, and 74 in Closing the Gaps. In addition, the agency also awards schools with "Distinction Designations" if they outperform schools with similar demographics. In 2018, Conroe High School was awarded two of the seven possible Distinction Designations: Academic Achievement in Science and Academic Achievement in Social Studies.

== Feeder patterns ==
The following schools feed into Conroe High School:

Elementary (K-4) schools:

- Anderson
- Armstrong
- Giesinger
- Houston
- Patterson
- Reaves
- Rice
- Runyan
- Wilkinson

Flex (K-6) schools:

- Gordon-Reed
- Stewart

Intermediate (5-6) schools:

- Bozman
- Cryar
- Travis

Junior High (7-8) schools:

- Peet
- Stockton

9th Grade Campus:

- Conroe High School 9th Grade Campus

== Notable alumni ==
- Kyle Bennett, Pro BMX and Olympian
- Will Bolt, current head baseball coach for the Nebraska Cornhuskers
- Larry Brantley, voice of Wishbone
- Jeromy Burnitz, former MLB outfielder for seven different teams
- Rock Cartwright, former NFL running back for the Washington Commanders and San Francisco 49ers
- Andrew Cashner, MLB pitcher for the Texas Rangers
- Jonathan Daviss (Class of 2018), American actor (know for Outer Banks Series)
- Philip Detro (Class of 1928), commander of the Lincoln Battalion during the Spanish Civil War
- Colin Edwards, Motocross Racer, World Superbike Champion, Current Motogp Racer
- Wiley Feagin, NFL lineman for the original Baltimore Colts & Washington Redskins
- Annette Gordon-Reed, American historian and law professor
- Roy Harris, Heavyweight boxer
- Will Metcalf (Class of 2003), investment banker and Republican member of the Texas House of Representatives from Conroe, beginning January 2015
- Ray Milo, former NFL safety
- Rod Myers, former MLB outfielder for the Kansas City Royals
- Dominique Ratcliff (Class of 2020), College Football 2026 National Champion and defensive lineman for the Indiana Hoosiers
- Tyke Tolbert (Class of 1986), Wide Receivers coach for the NFL New York Giants.

== Controversies ==
=== Cheryl Dee Fergeson Case ===
On August 23, 1980, sixteen-year-old Cheryl Dee Fergeson, a volleyball player from a visiting high school, was raped and strangled in a Conroe High School restroom. After being reported missing, her body was found in the auditorium sound room loft by Clarence Brandley and another janitor. The victim was white, leading to a heated, racially charged case where the accused, black janitor Clarence Brandley, was sentenced to death amid allegations that his arrest and conviction were tainted with racism. After nine years on death row, Brandley was exonerated and released. Even though there was evidence pointing to two white males, neither has ever been charged. In 1991 British investigative journalist Nick Davies published "White Lies" - Rape, Murder, and Justice Texas Style. his investigation of the case. Clarence Brandley's story is also told in the movie Whitewash: The Clarence Bradley Story (2002)

=== ICE Walk Out ===
On January 30, 2026, following the national 'ICE Out' movement, students at Conroe High School held a walkout protest at 1:05 PM. Many students could be seen jumping the school fences. The district responded stating they respected the first amendment of students, but walkouts or other activities which disrupted instructional time were prohibited. The district also stated that there will be attendance and campus based punishments to discourage further disruption.
