= Conroe ISD Academy of Science and Technology =

Academy of Science and Technology

Location
- 3701 College Park Dr. The Woodlands, Texas; United States; 30°12′20.56″N 95°28′18.33″W

Information
- Type: Public, Selective Magnet School, NCSSS School
- Motto: Teamwork, Responsibility, Integrity, Perseverance
- Established: 1987
- School district: Conroe ISD
- Oversight: Texas Education Agency
- Headmaster: Dr. Debra Creel
- Faculty: 10
- Grades: 9–12
- Enrollment: 280
- Affiliations: National Consortium of Secondary STEM Schools
- Nickname: The Academy
- Website: cpast.conroeisd.net

The Conroe Independent School District's Academy of Science and Technology, located in The Woodlands, Texas, is a magnet school in science and technology, being also a member of the National Consortium of Specialized STEM Schools (NCSSS). It was founded at Oak Ridge High School in 1987 with the first graduates in 1991. The AST relocated to The Woodlands College Park High School in stages from 2005 to 2007. The first Headmaster in 1991 was Dr. Ron Laugen, who came from the Lawrence Hall of Science, UC Berkeley. He was succeeded in 2007 by Dr. Susan Caffery, who served until 2023. The third Headmaster is Dr. Debra Creel.

Only electives and courses related to STEM are contained within the Academy and consist purely of AST students. All other courses unrelated to STEM are taken with students who are not in the magnet program.

Candidates are accepted by the Academy of Science and Technology following application, testing, essay reviewing, and an in-person interview by members of faculty. For each class, 65 students are initially accepted, and ten are wait-listed. The size of each class at a given time is between 65 and 77 students. There are approximately 280 students in the Academy, selected from the College Park High School, Woodlands High School, and Oak Ridge High School attendance zones.
