= Tamina, Texas =

Unincorporated community in Texas, US

Coordinates: 30°10′43″N 95°26′30″W

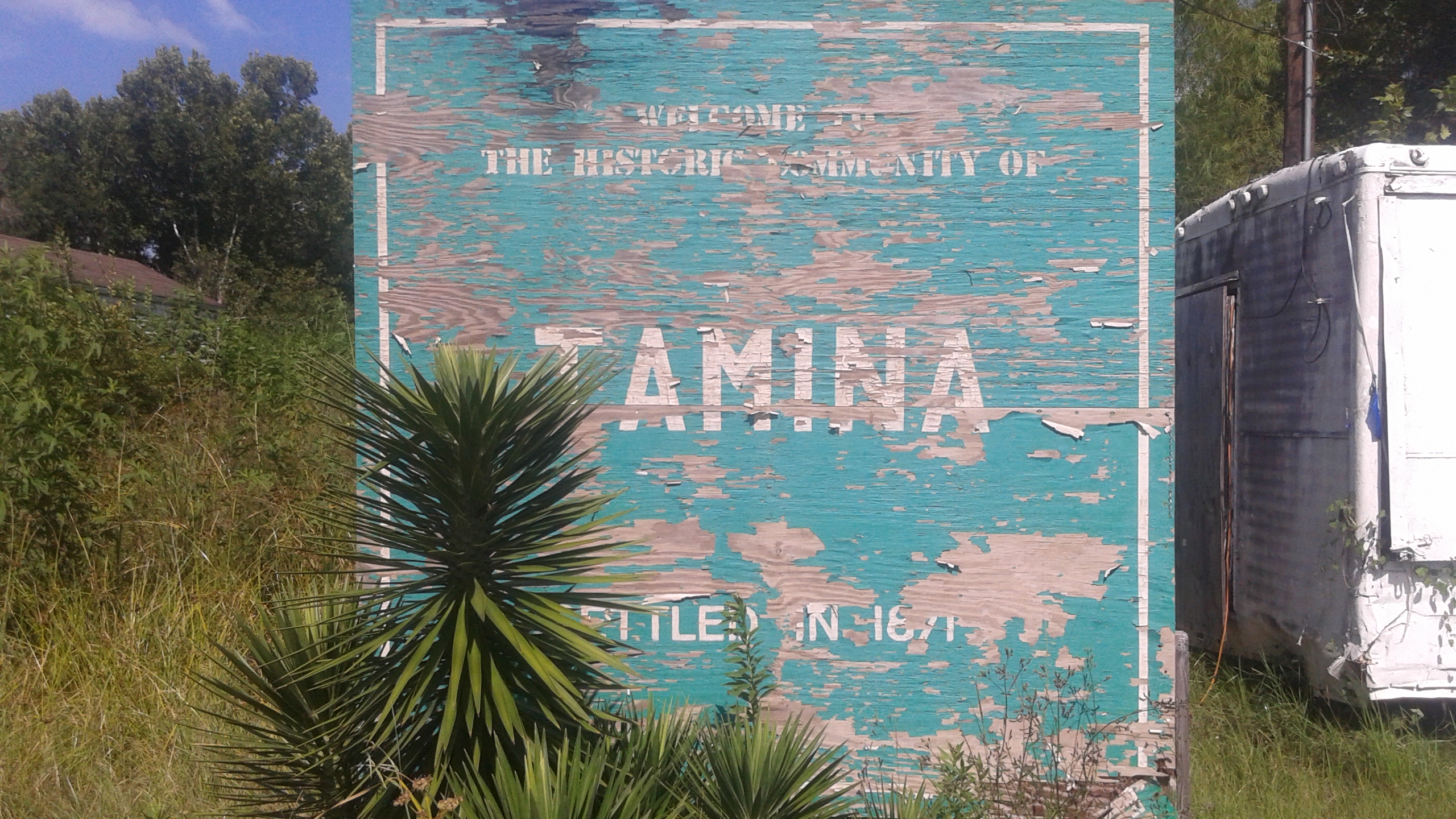
Welcome sign at the entrance of the unincorporated community of Tamina, Texas

Tamina is an unincorporated community in southern Montgomery County, Texas, United States.

Tamina is located along the Missouri Pacific line, located 1 mile (1.6 km) east of Interstate 45 and 8.5 miles (13.7 km) south of the city of Conroe.

James H. Berry promoted the community and named it after Tammany Hall, New York City. The letter writer submitting the name to the postal department spelled the name "Tamina." The name is pronounced "Tammany" by some of the community's older residents.

== History ==
The founding of Tamina can be traced back to 1871, when freedmen in the area helped construct the Houston and Great Northern Railroad. The town became known as "Tamina" in 1897 when the name was submitted for the building of the community's first post office.

In the early 1900s, the community survived mostly through its connection with the lumber industry, particularly after the establishment of the Grogan-Cochran Lumber Company's Tamina Mill in 1917. The population of the area dwindled to 50 after the Tamina Mill was closed in 1927. The post office closed in the late 1930s, followed by the town's black school in 1949. At that time, Tamina students attended Booker T. Washington School in Conroe.

== Public Sewer Service ==
Over the past 50 years, the area surrounding Tamina has undergone significant development, leading to the incorporation of the adjacent cities of Shenandoah in 1974 and Oak Ridge North in 1979. As a result, Tamina became the only community in the area without urban infrastructure, most notably a public sewerage. Most residents of Tamina rely on septic tanks for sewage disposal, while a few residents make use of the more expensive aerobic treatment system for their homes.

The first attempt in the early 2000s to install a public sewerage system, a collaborative project with Oak Ridge North, failed after Tamina residents refused the terms of a Texas Water Development Board loan which would have required Tamina to give up certain rights over usage of the water.

A second attempt at establishing a public sewerage system was initiated in 2006–2007 between Tamina and the City of Shenandoah. The United States Department of Agriculture offered a loan to Tamina for the construction of a public sewerage system on the condition that Tamina find a municipality willing to treat the sewage. Shenandoah eventually backed out of the deal because the loan also prohibits Shenandoah from annexing Tamina until the debt is repaid. While Shenandoah is not currently populous enough under current state law to annex territory, population growth projections estimate that Shenandoah will pass the requisite 5000 person threshold by 2030.

== Demographics ==
Because Tamina is an unincorporated community, the United States Census does not collect demographic data specific only to the Tamina community, but rather divides the Tamina area among three larger census tracts. As a result, estimates of Tamina's population vary, ranging from 200 to 1000. With its history as a freedmen's town, most of the residents of the community are African-American. Many residents have been living in the community for multiple generations, with some residents tracing their ancestry back to the beginning of the community.

== Education ==
The community is within the Conroe Independent School District.

The area is divided between the attendance zones of Oak Ridge Elementary School and Houser Elementary School.

The following schools serve all of the Tamina area.

- Vogel Intermediate School
- Irons Junior High School
- Oak Ridge High School
