= Rock Cartwright =

American football player and coach (born 1979)

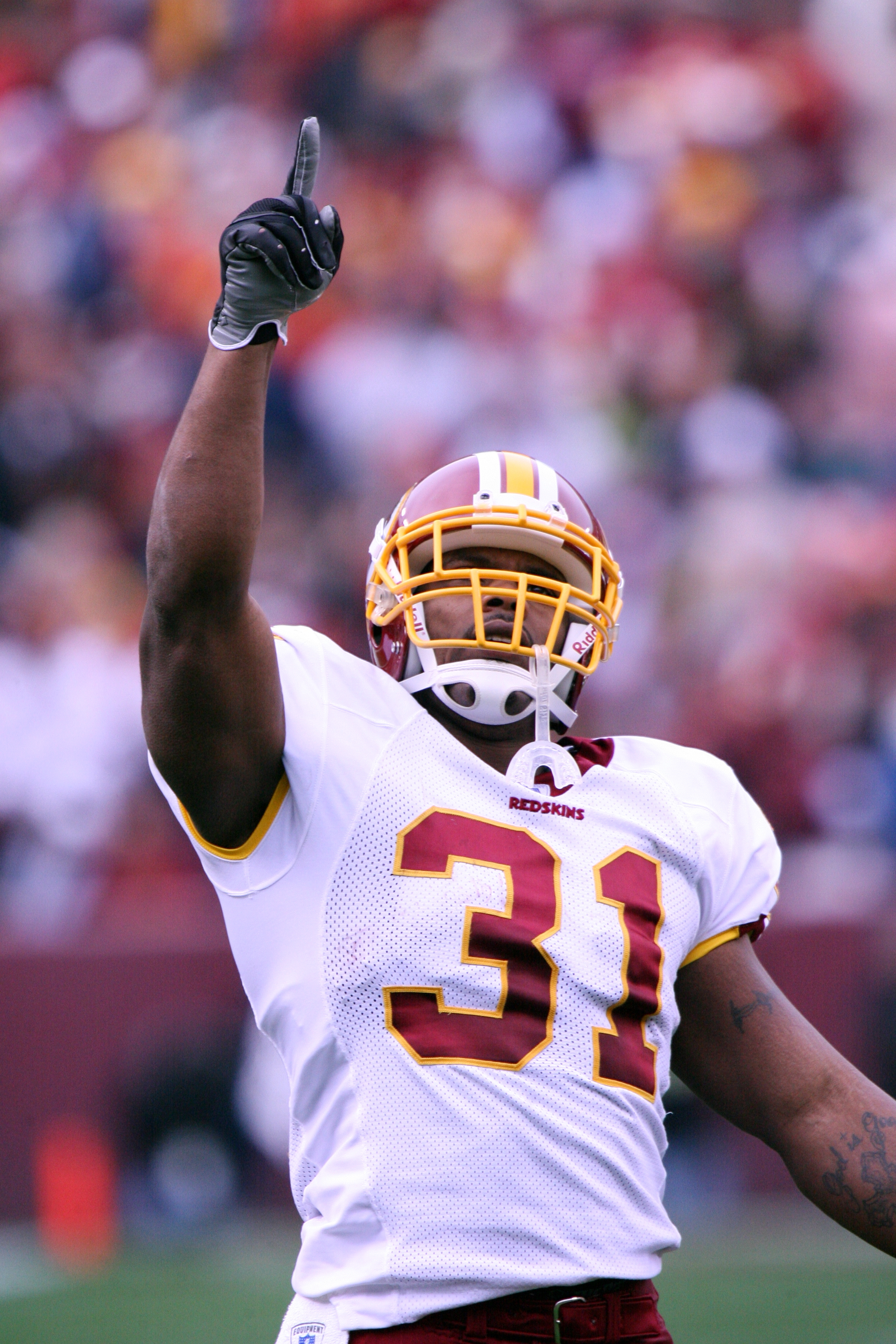
- Cartwright with the Washington Redskins in 2006

No. 40, 31, 25
- Position: Running back

Personal information
- Born: December 3, 1979 (age 46); Conroe, Texas, U.S.
- Listed height: 5 ft 8 in (1.73 m)
- Listed weight: 215 lb (98 kg)

Career information
- High school: Conroe
- College: Kansas State
- NFL draft: 2002: 7th round, 257th overall pick

Career history

Playing
- Washington Redskins (2002–2009); Oakland Raiders (2010–2011); San Francisco 49ers (2012)*
- * Offseason or practice squad member only

Coaching
- Cleveland Browns (2016) Offensive quality control coach

Career NFL statistics
- Rushing attempts: 228
- Rushing yards: 956
- Receptions: 64
- Receiving yards: 589
- Return yards: 5,450
- Total touchdowns: 9
- Stats at Pro Football Reference

Roderick Rashaun Cartwright (born December 3, 1979) is an American former professional football player who was a running back in the National Football League (NFL). He played college football for the Kansas State Wildcats and was selected by the Washington Redskins in the seventh round of the 2002 NFL draft. Cartwright was also a member of the Oakland Raiders and San Francisco 49ers. He was named offensive quality control coach of the Cleveland Browns in 2016.

== Early life ==
Cartwright attended Conroe High School in Conroe, Texas, and lettered in football, track and field, and baseball. During his senior year, Cartwright rushed for 2,060 yards and was named a Parade All-American.

== College career ==
Cartwright played college football at Kansas State University at the fullback position after transferring from Trinity Valley Community College in Athens, Texas.

== Professional career ==
Pre-draft measurables
| Height | Weight | Arm length | Hand span | 40-yard dash | 10-yard split | 20-yard split | 20-yard shuttle | Three-cone drill | Vertical jump | Broad jump | Bench press |
|---|---|---|---|---|---|---|---|---|---|---|---|
| 5 ft 7 3/4 in (1.72 m) | 237 lb (108 kg) | 30 3/4 in (0.78 m) | 9 in (0.23 m) | 4.42 s | 1.58 s | 2.60 s | 4.25 s | 7.18 s | 35.0 in (0.89 m) | 9 ft 8 in (2.95 m) | 30 reps |
All values from NFL Combine

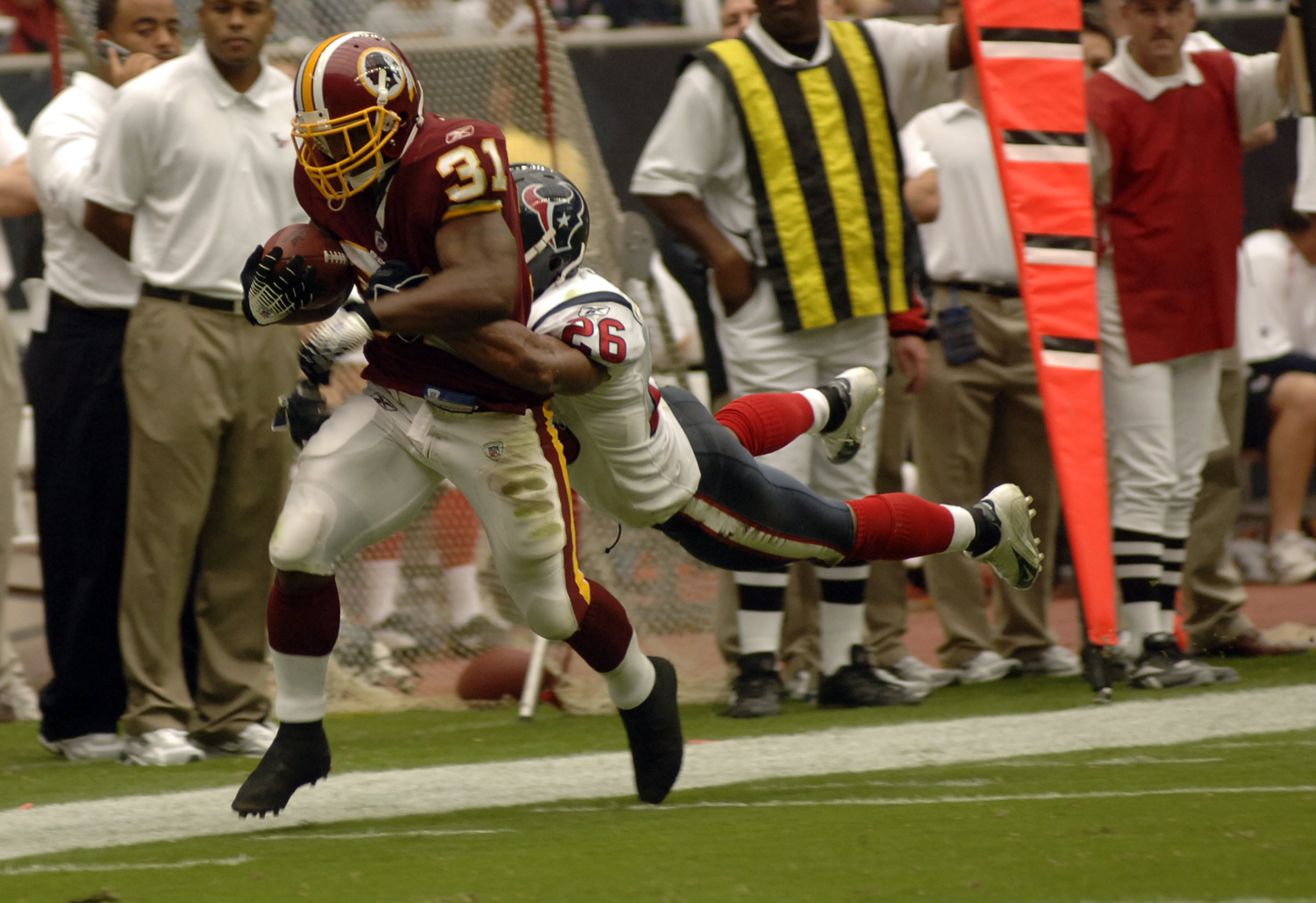
Cartwright is tackled by Houston Texans strong safety Glenn Earl.

=== Washington Redskins ===
Cartwright was selected in the seventh round of the 2002 NFL draft by the Redskins. In 2006, he broke the Redskins' single-season kickoff return yards record with 64 returns for 1,541 yards - a record which had been previously held by Brian Mitchell since 1994. He also received his first kickoff return for a touchdown in 2006 against the Dallas Cowboys. In 2007, he was ranked second in the NFC in kickoff returns. He was released on March 4, 2010.

=== Oakland Raiders ===
Cartwright signed with the Oakland Raiders on April 26, 2010.

=== San Francisco 49ers ===
Carwright signed with the San Francisco 49ers on March 15, 2012. He was released on August 31, 2012.

=== Coaching career ===
Cartwright was signed as an offensive quality control coach of the Cleveland Browns in 2016.
