= River Plantation, Texas =

Unincorporated community in Texas, US

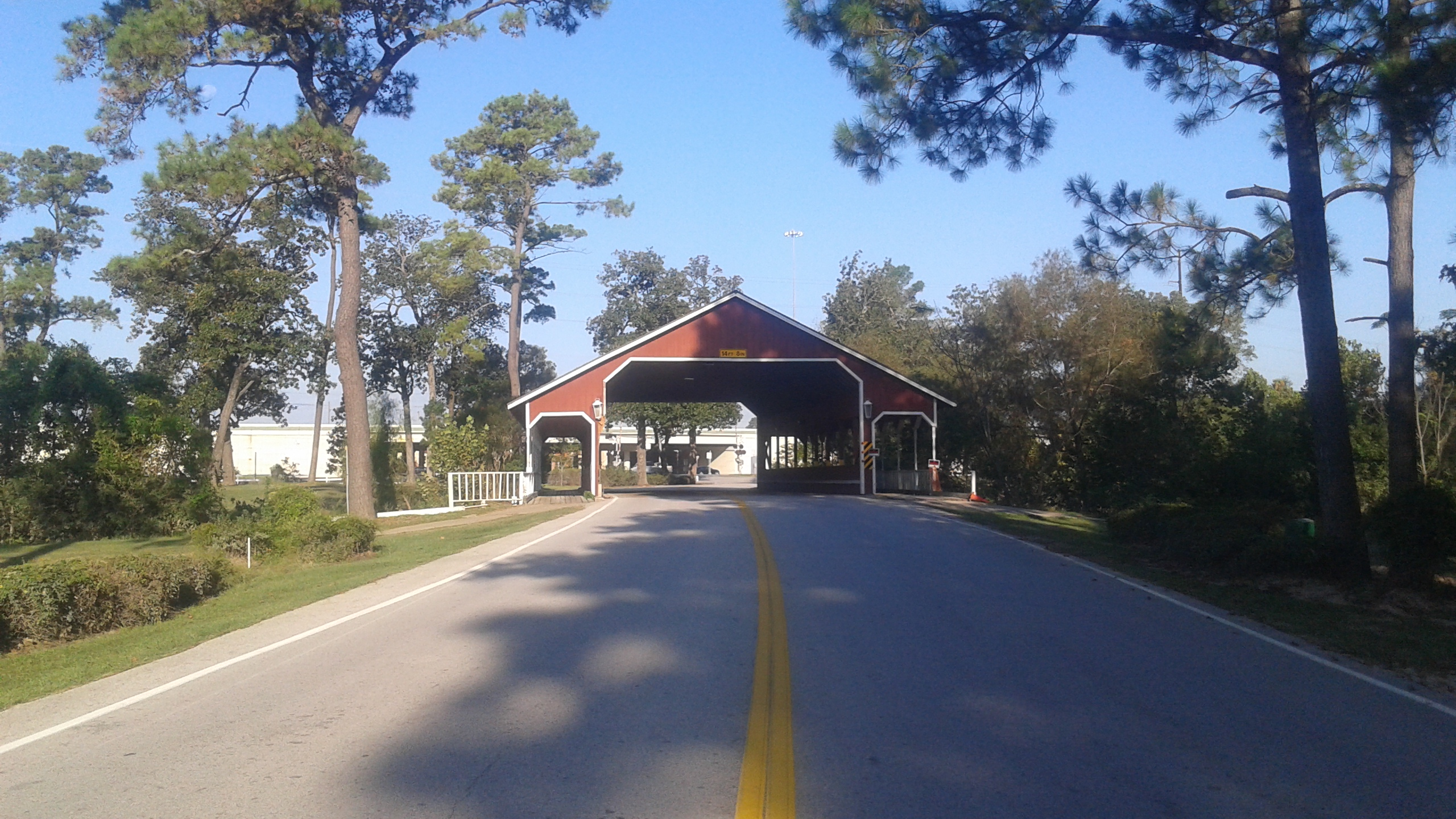
Bridge marking the entrance and exit from River Plantation

River Plantation is an unincorporated community in Montgomery County, Texas, United States. It is located along the banks of the San Jacinto River, 6 miles (9.7 km) south of Conroe. As of 2007, it had 1,200 houses and approximately 3,000 residents. According to the 2015 American Community Survey, the median household income for residents living in River Plantation and the surrounding area was $84,583.

== History ==
The lower reaches of the community were developed in the late 1960s. An underpass of Interstate 45 opened before April 18, 2007, increasing access to the community.

=== Flooding Incidents ===
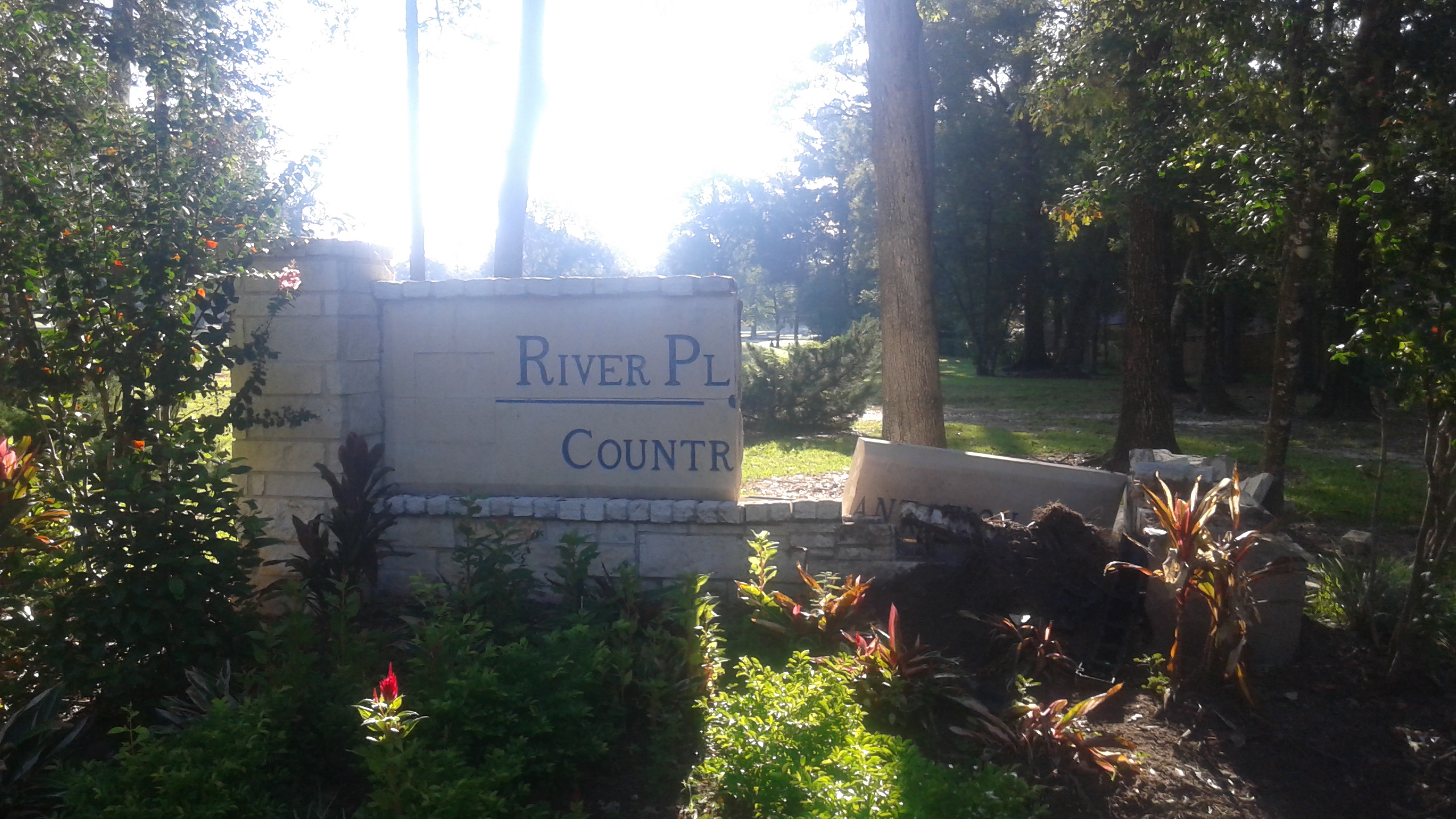
Many buildings and other structures were damaged due to Hurricane Harvey.

Due to its proximity to the San Jacinto River and its low elevation, the community of River Plantation is prone to frequent flooding.

In 1994, a deluge of rain across Southeast Texas caused flooding in several communities. Throughout the state, six died from the flooding. In River Plantation, water from the San Jacinto River flooded 110 houses. The Federal Government of the United States bought and razed twenty of them; Gwen Hruska Park is located where the former houses stood.

Major flooding events in 2015 and 2016 caused local officials to issue voluntary evacuations of River Plantation.

Hurricane Harvey in 2017 resulted in severe flooding of the neighborhood, water up to the second story of some homes, and a mandatory evacuation due to record releases from the Lake Conroe dam.

== Geography ==
River Plantation is located along the banks of the San Jacinto River, 6 miles (9.7 km) south of Conroe.

The subdivision has curving roadways, as opposed to a grid road system.

== Education ==
Residents are within the Conroe Independent School District. They are zoned to Bonnie Wilkinson Elementary School, Oree Bozman Intermediate School, Peet Junior High School, and Conroe High School. Wilkinson was named after a principal in Conroe ISD.

== Parks and recreation ==
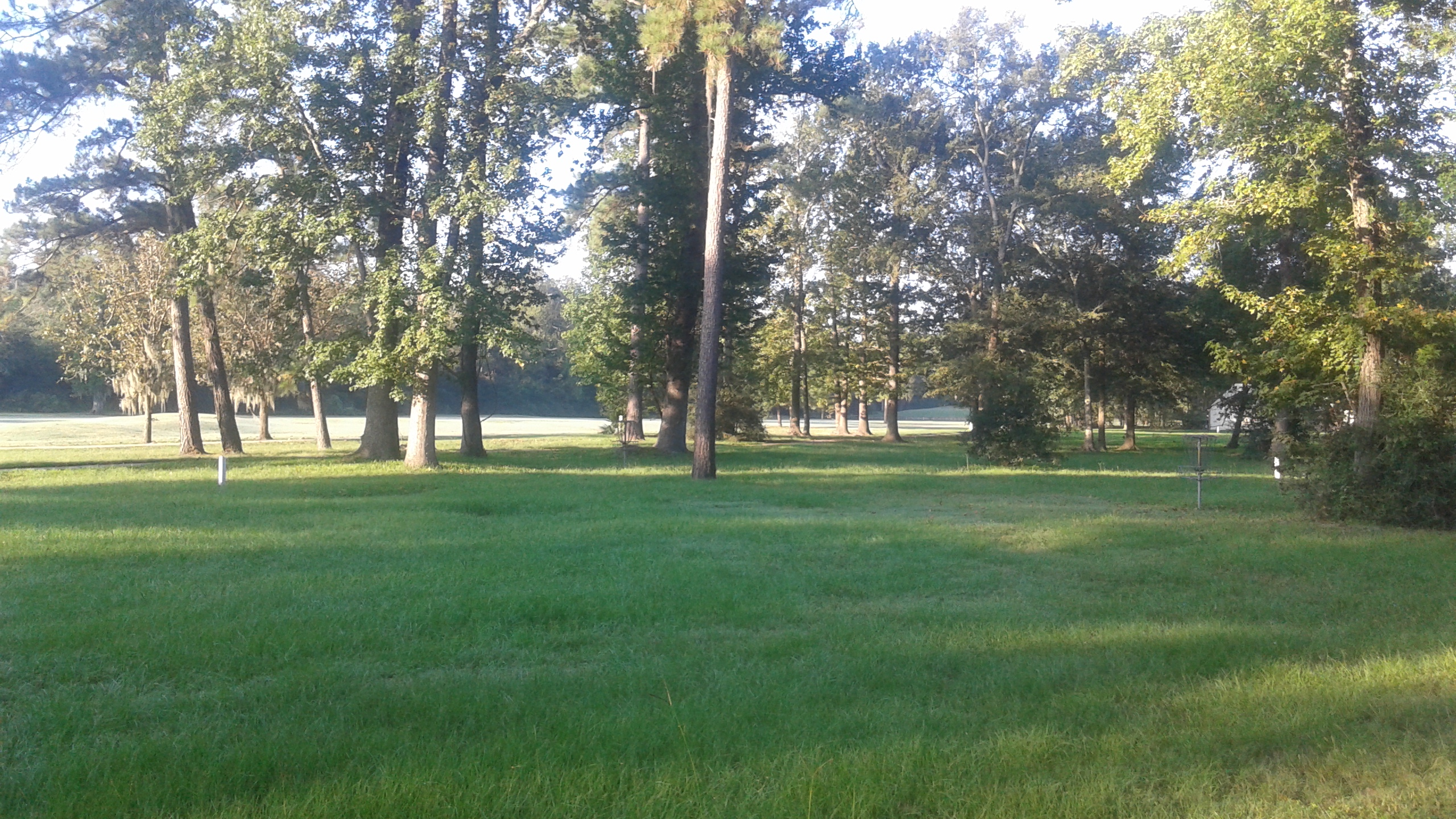
Gwen Hruska Park disc golf course

Gwen Hruska Park, named after a former president of the homeowner's association, is located in River Plantation. It is located on 12 acres (4.9 ha) of land that consists of post-1994 flood buyouts from the Federal Emergency Management Agency and land donations. The River Plantation Community Improvement Association (RPCIA) operates and maintains the park and its trails. 5,022 feet (1,531 m) (linear feet) of concrete trails are located in the park. The Texas Parks and Wildlife Grant Assistant Program funded the trails.
