= Ray Milo =

American football player (born 1954)

No. 27
- Position: Safety

Personal information
- Born: February 19, 1954 (age 72); Conroe, Texas, U.S.
- Listed height: 5 ft 11 in (1.80 m)
- Listed weight: 178 lb (81 kg)

Career information
- High school: Conroe
- College: New Mexico State
- NFL draft: 1978: 11th round, 280th overall pick

Career history
- Kansas City Chiefs (1978); Saskatchewan Roughriders (1978–1980)
- Stats at Pro Football Reference

Raymond Wesley Milo (born February 19, 1954) is an American former professional football safety who played for the Kansas City Chiefs of the National Football League (NFL). He played college football at New Mexico State University.
