= Imperial Oaks, Texas =

Unincorporated community in Texas, US

Imperial Oaks is an unincorporated community on the east side of Interstate 45 in southern Montgomery County, Texas, United States.

The community spans 1,400 acres (570 ha). Imperial Oaks has plans to hold 3,600 single family homes.

The community is located within the Rayford Road Municipal Utility District.

== History ==
Holcomb Schubert formed the Imperial Oaks Joint Venture and began development of the community in 1990.

== Education ==
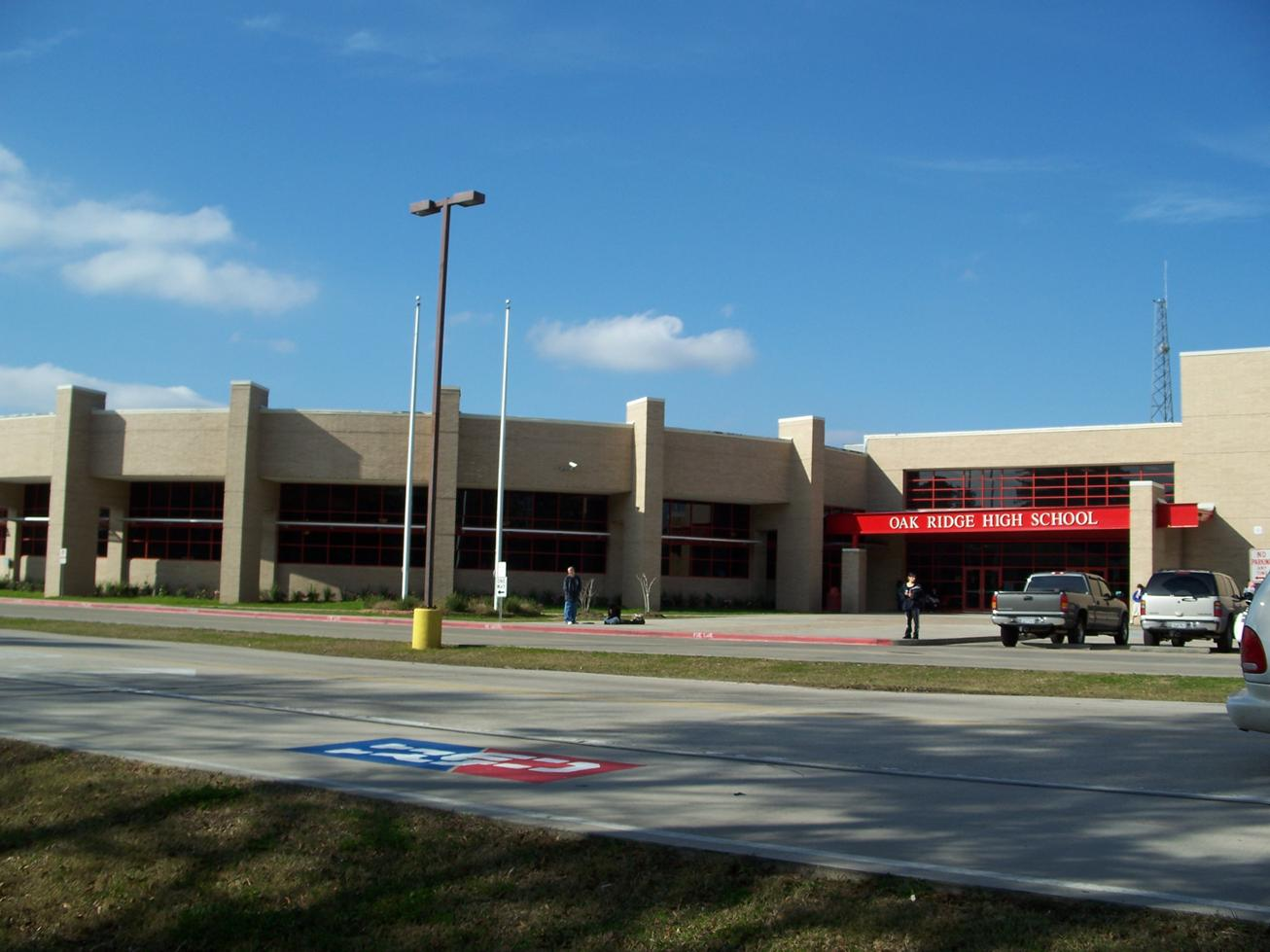
Oak Ridge High School

The Conroe Independent School District includes the following schools in Imperial Oaks:

- Kaufman Elementary School
- Vogel Intermediate School
- Irons Junior High School
- Oak Ridge High School

Kaufman, located in Imperial Oaks, opened in August 2006. The developer of Imperial Oaks donated the land for the school.

In August 2012 the Gerald D. Irons, Sr. Junior High School was scheduled to open, taking all territory that is currently zoned to Vogel Intermediate.
