= Conroe Independent School District =

School district in Texas

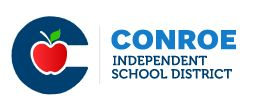

Address
- 3205 W Davis Conroe, Texas, 77304; United States
- Coordinates: 30°19′14″N 95°29′10″W

District information
- Type: Public
- Motto: All Means All
- Grades: PK–12
- Established: July 12, 1892; 134 years ago
- Superintendent: David Vinson
- Governing agency: Texas Education Agency
- Schools: 71
- NCES District ID: 4815000

Students and staff
- Enrollment: 72,352 (2023–2024)
- Teachers: 4,716.16 (on an FTE basis)
- Staff: 4,702.12 (on an FTE basis)
- Student–teacher ratio: 15.34

Other information
- Website: www.conroeisd.net

Conroe Independent School District (CISD) is a school district in Montgomery County, Texas. As of July 2025, Conroe ISD was the seventh-largest school district in Texas and 49th-largest in the United States.

The district's headquarters are located in the Deane L. Sadler Administration/Technology Center in Conroe. The CISD area, which covers 348 square miles (900 km^{2}), is part of the Lone Star College System (formerly the North Harris Montgomery Community College District).

For the 2022-2023 school year, the district received a score of 84 out of 100 from the Texas Education Agency.

== History ==
The first school within Conroe ISD's current boundaries was built in 1886 and called, "Conroe Mill School". The building had one room and was open for five months each year. A school for African American students was started soon after inside a Baptist church. The school district was created on July 12, 1892, by order of the Commissioners Court of Montgomery County, which appointed the county judge and three trustees to oversee the district's operations. A new school built in 1899 initially housed 10 grades. In 1902, one male and three females were the first students to receive high school diplomas. In 1911, taxpayers approved a $25,000 bond for the construction of the district's first brick building, the JOH Bennette school. In 1925, the Texas State Legislature expanded the size of the district from 25 to 333 square miles. The oldest school still in operation is Travis Intermediate School, formerly Crockett High School, built in 1926. In 1954, Booker T. Washington High School opened as a school for African-American students. Crockett High School students were moved to the current Conroe High School campus in 1964. From 1968–1969, Conroe ISD's campuses were desegregated.

== Service area ==
Conroe ISD serves most of the city of Conroe, and the cities of Cut and Shoot, Oak Ridge North, and Shenandoah, and the town of Woodloch. It also serves unincorporated communities, including almost all of The Woodlands (extreme south and west parts of The Woodlands are located in Tomball ISD and Magnolia ISD, respectively), parts of Deerwood, the settlement of Tamina, the community of River Plantation, and a portion of the Porter Heights CDP. It also includes the former city of Chateau Woods.

== Schools ==
=== Conroe High School feeder ===
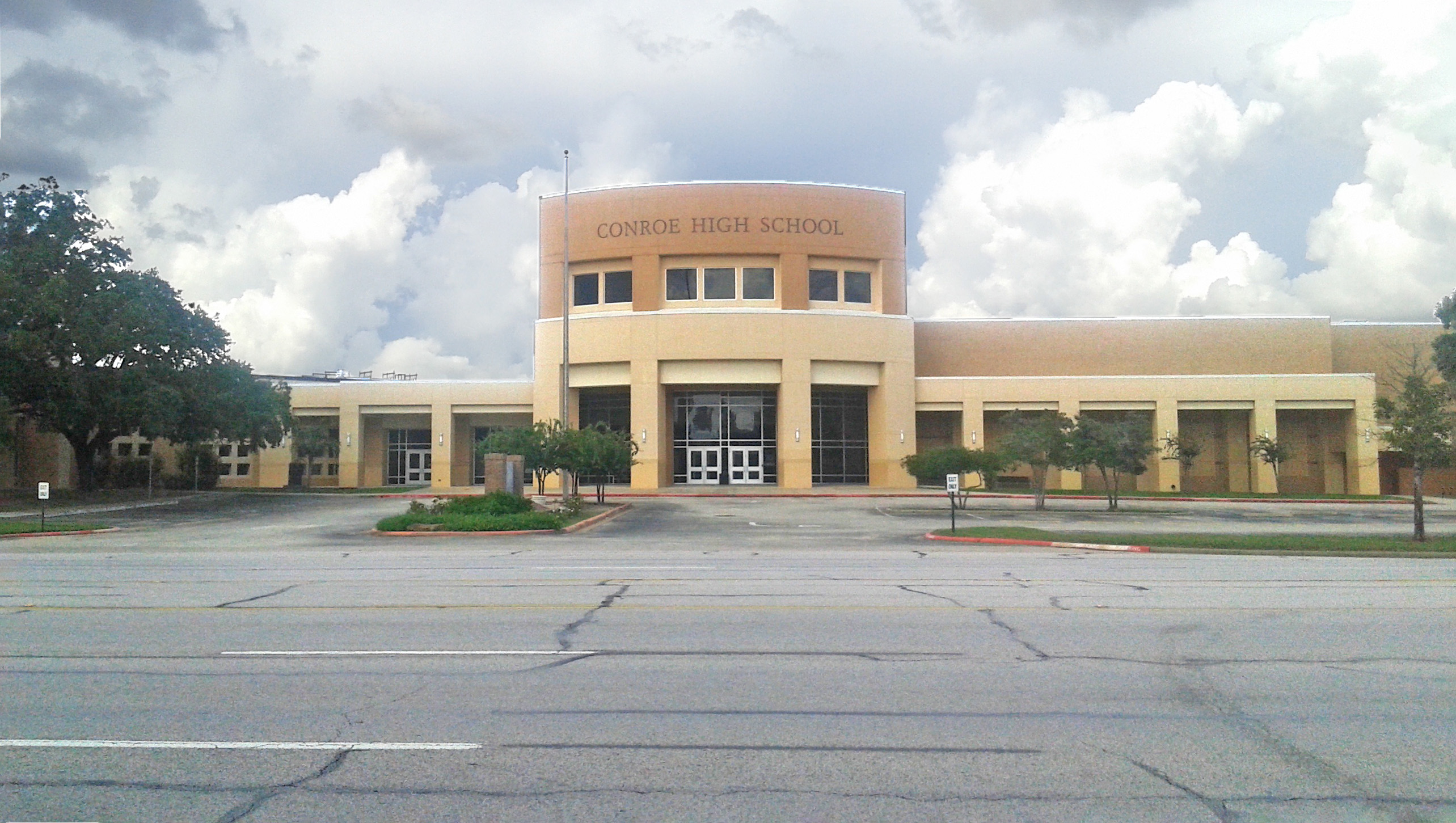
Conroe High School

The Conroe High School attendance zone serves most of the city of Conroe as well as an area of unincorporated Montgomery County surrounding the city, including the community of River Plantation.

==== High schools (9–12) ====
- Conroe High School and Conroe High School 9th Grade Campus
  - Academy of Science & Health Professions

==== Junior high schools (7–8) ====
- John V. Peet Junior High School
- Dr. Donald Stockton Junior High School

==== Intermediate schools (5–6) ====
- Oree Bozman Intermediate school
- Cryar Intermediate School
- Fowler Intermediate School
- Travis Intermediate School

==== Flex schools (PK–6) ====
- Jean E. Stewart Elementary School
- Annette Gordon-Reed Elementary School

==== Elementary schools (PK–4) ====
- Anderson Elementary School
- Neil Armstrong Elementary School
- Janet K. Bartlett Elementary School
- Giesinger Elementary School
- Sam Houston Elementary School
- Charlie L Patterson Elementary School
- O. A. Reaves Elementary School
- B. B. Rice Elementary School
- J. W. Runyan Elementary School
- Wilkinson Elementary School

=== Oak Ridge High School feeder ===
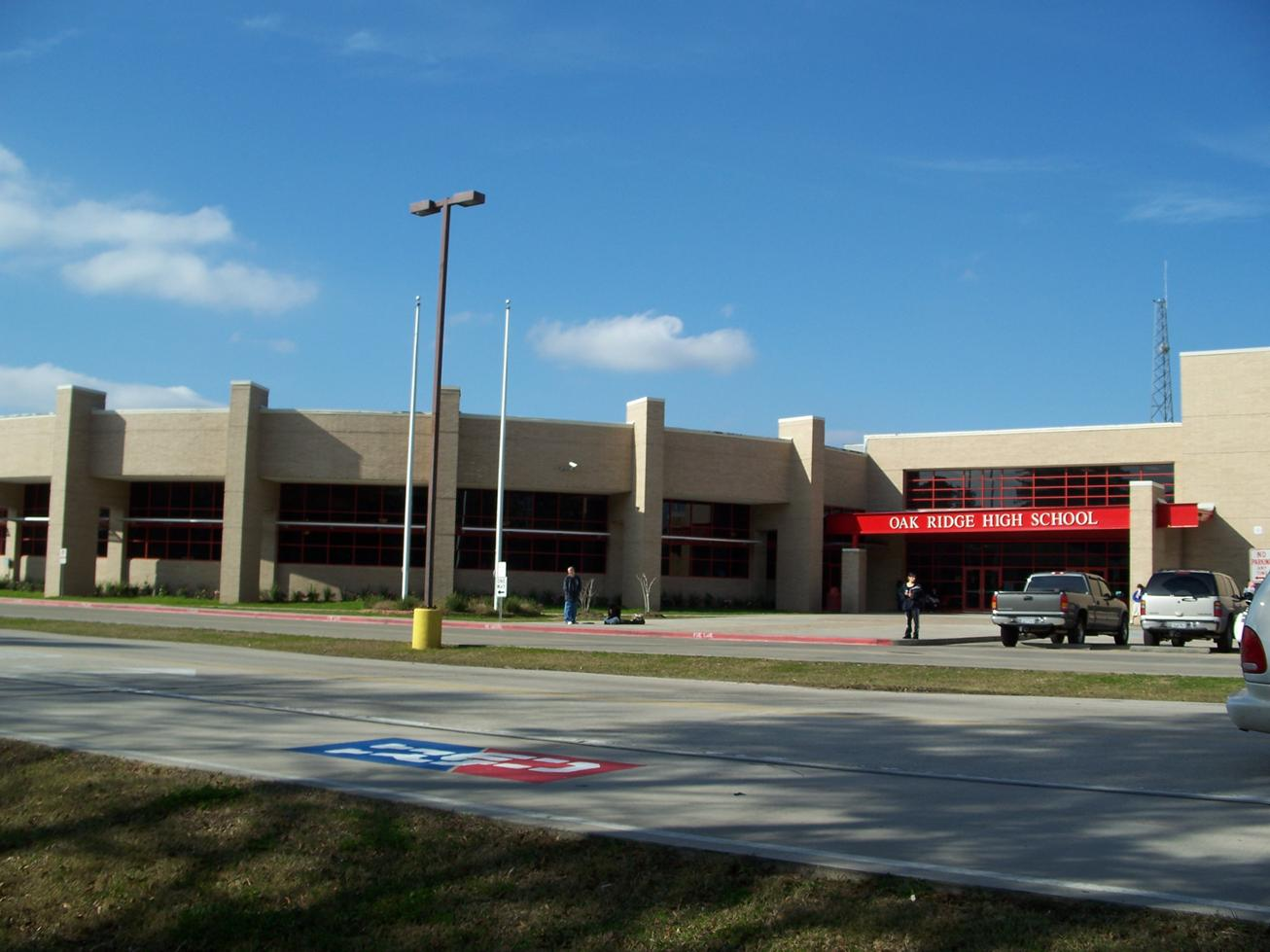
Oak Ridge High School

The Oak Ridge High School attendance zone serves the city of Oak Ridge North, a portion of the city of Shenandoah, and the unincorporated communities of Spring, Imperial Oaks, and Tamina.

==== High schools (9–12) ====
- Oak Ridge High School and Oak Ridge High School 9th Grade Campus
  - Academy for Careers in Engineering and Science

==== Junior high schools (7–8) ====
- Gerald D. Irons Sr. Junior High School

==== Intermediate schools (5–6) ====
- Dolly Vogel Intermediate School

==== Flex schools (PK–6) ====
- David & Sheree Suchma Elementary School
- Mittie J. Campbell Elementary School (partial - some students zoned to Caney Creek)

==== Elementary schools (PK–4) ====
- A. Davis Ford Elementary School (partial - some students zoned to Grand Oaks)
- Emmit E. Houser Elementary School (partial - some students zoned to College Park)
- George C. Kaufman III Elementary School
- Oak Ridge Elementary School

=== Caney Creek High School feeder ===
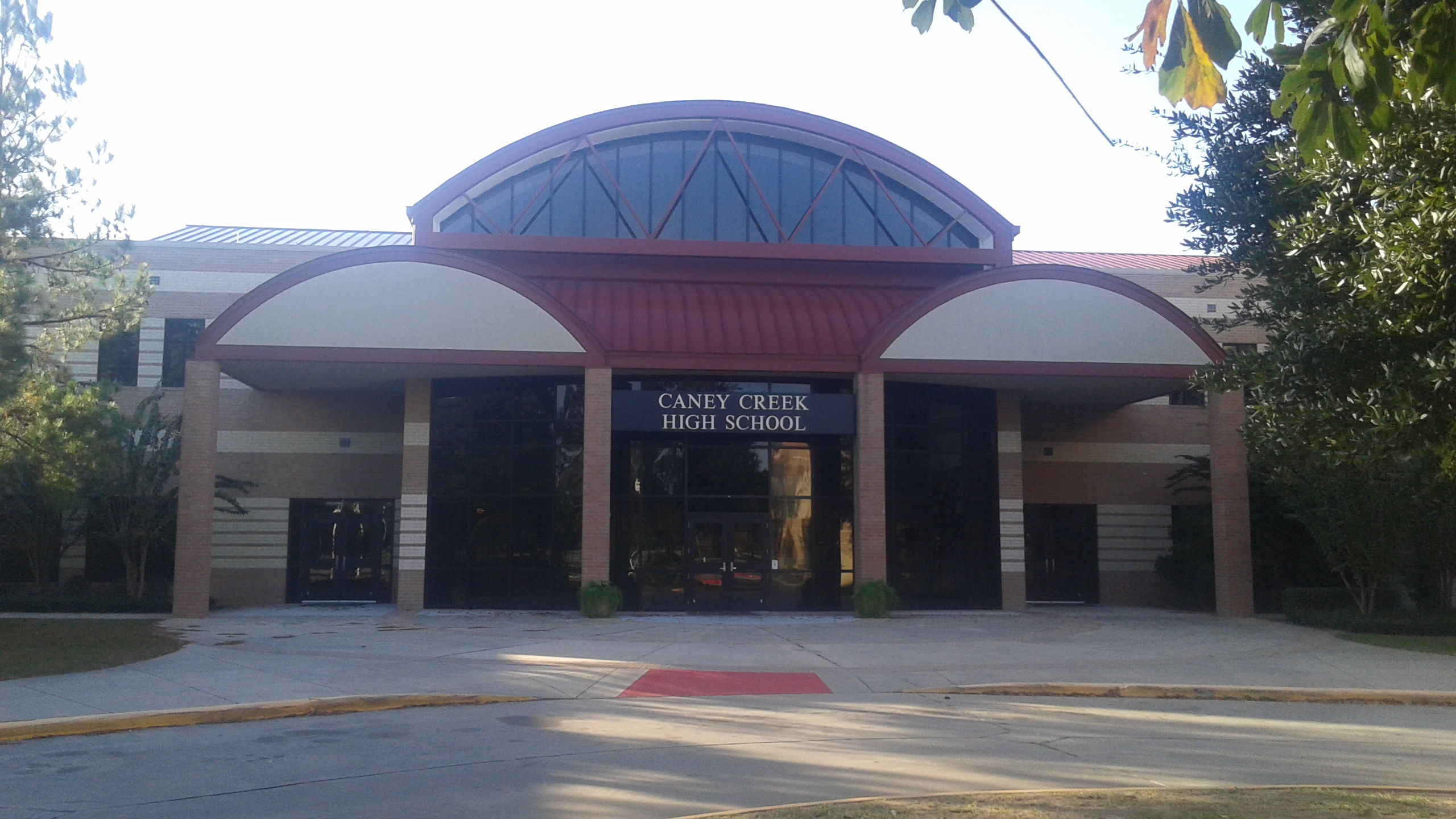
Caney Creek High School

The Caney Creek High School attendance zone serves a large section of Montgomery County east of Conroe, including the city of Cut and Shoot, the unincorporated community of Grangerland, and a portion of Porter Heights.

==== High schools (9–12) ====
- Caney Creek High School

==== Junior high schools (7–8) ====
- Moorhead Junior High School

==== Intermediate schools (5–6) ====
- Grangerland Intermediate School
- Veterans Memorial Intermediate School

==== Flex schools (PK–6) ====
- Mittie J. Campbell Elementary School (partial - some students zoned to Oak Ridge)

==== Elementary schools (PK–4) ====
- Stephen F. Austin Elementary School
- Gerald J. Creighton Jr. Elementary School
- Ruben W. Hope Jr. Elementary School
- Ben Milam Elementary School
- San Jacinto Elementary School

=== The Woodlands High School feeder ===
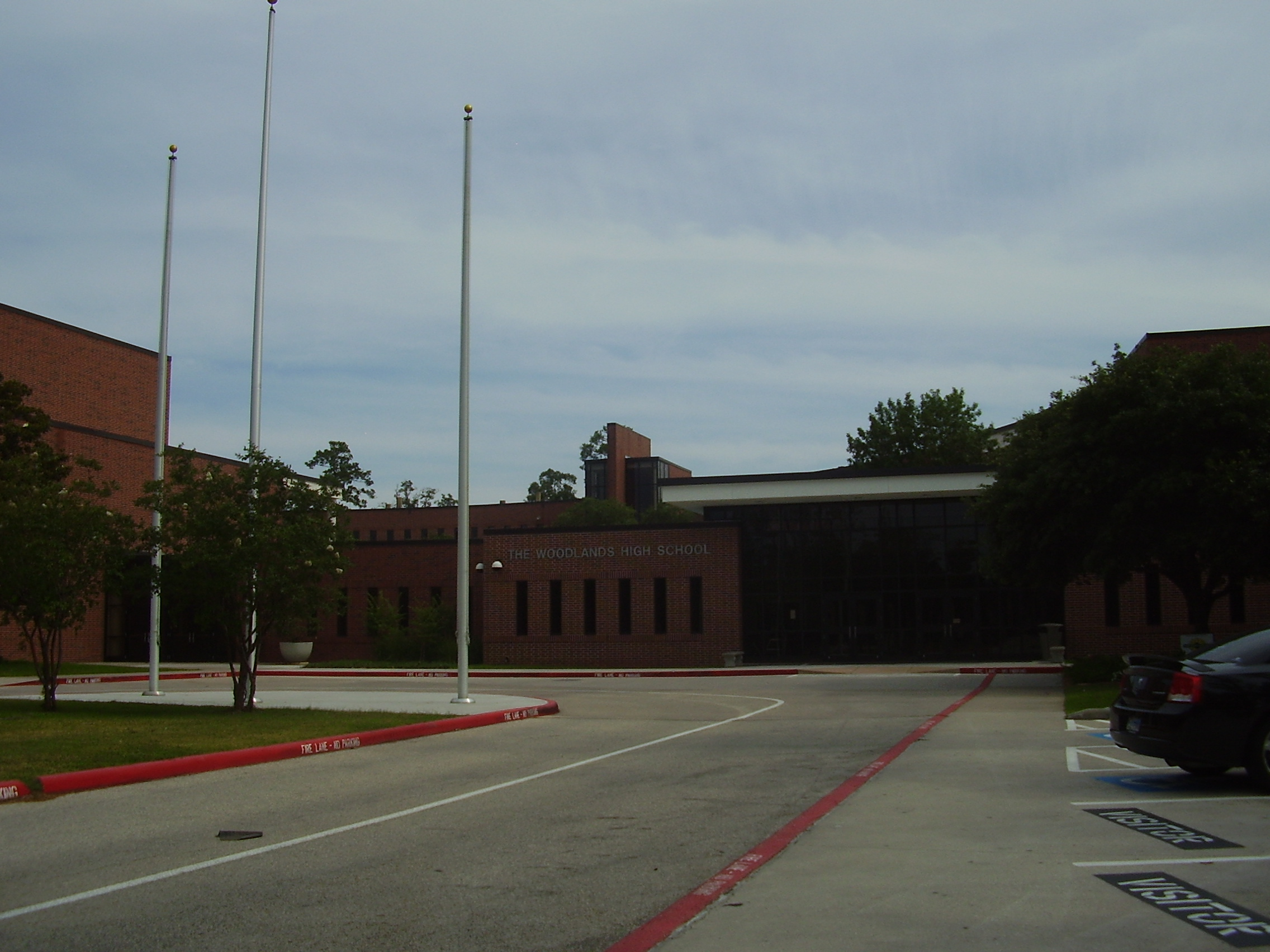
The Woodlands High School

The Woodlands High School attendance zone serves the western portion of The Woodlands as well as a small portion of southern Conroe.

==== High schools (9–12) ====
- The Woodlands High School and The Woodlands High School 9th Grade Campus

==== Junior high schools (7–8) ====
- McCullough Junior High School

==== Intermediate schools (5–6) ====
- George P. Mitchell Intermediate School
- W. O. Wilkerson Intermediate School (partial - some students zoned to College Park)

==== Flex schools (PK–6) ====
- Joel L. Deretchin Elementary School
- W. Robert Eissler Elementary
- Coulson Tough Elementary School

==== Elementary schools (PK–4) ====
- Don A. Buckalew Elementary School (partial - some students zoned to College Park)
- Barbara Pierce Bush Elementary School
- Roger L. Galatas Elementary School (partial - some students zoned to College Park)
- Glen Loch Elementary School (partial - some students zoned to College Park)
- Colin Powell Elementary School (partial - some students zoned to College Park)

=== The Woodlands College Park High School feeder ===
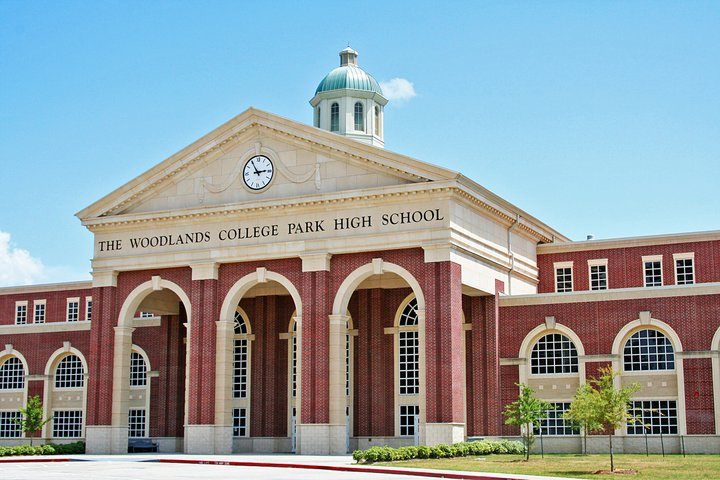
The Woodlands College Park High School

The Woodlands College Park High School attendance zone serves the eastern portion of The Woodlands as well as a portion of the city of Shenandoah.

==== High schools (9–12) ====
- The Woodlands College Park High School
  - Academy of Science & Technology

==== Junior high schools (7–8) ====
- Neal Knox Junior High School

==== Intermediate schools (5–6) ====
- Collins Intermediate School
- W. O. Wilkerson Intermediate School (partial - some students zoned to The Woodlands HS)

==== Elementary schools (PK–4) ====
- Don A. Buckalew Elementary School (partial - some students zoned to The Woodlands HS)
- David Elementary School
  - National Blue Ribbon School in 2000–01
- Roger L. Galatas Elementary School (partial - some students zoned to The Woodlands HS)
- Glen Loch Elementary School (partial - some students zoned to The Woodlands HS)
- Sam K. Hailey Elementary School
- Emmit E. Houser Elementary School (partial - some students zoned to Oak Ridge)
- Lamar Elementary School
- Colin Powell Elementary School (partial - some students zoned to The Woodlands HS)
- Sally K. Ride Elementary School

=== Grand Oaks High School feeder ===
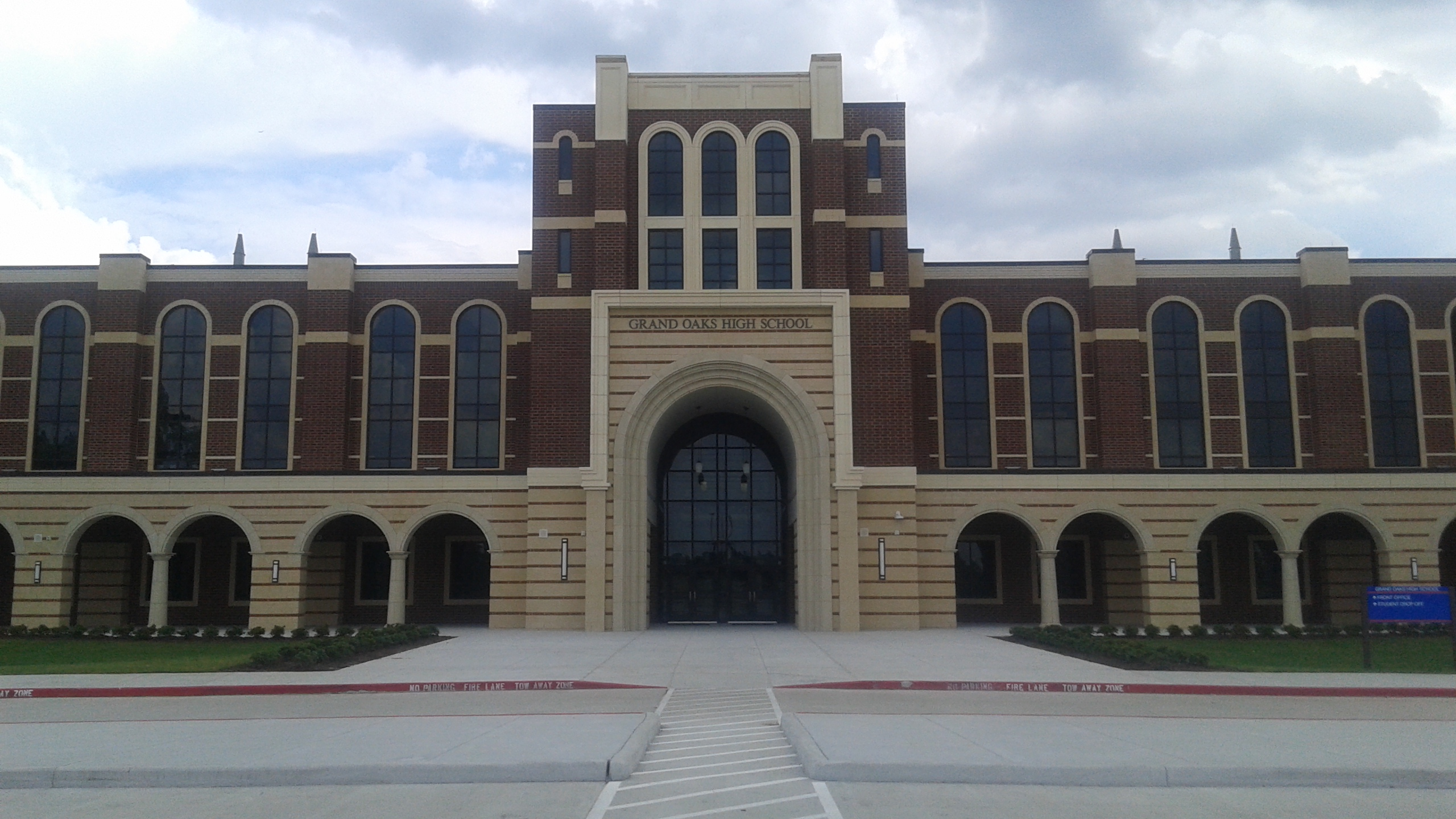
Grand Oaks High School

The Grand Oaks High School attendance zone serves an area of unincorporated Montgomery County near Spring.

==== High schools (9–12) ====
- Grand Oaks High School

==== Junior high schools (7–8) ====
- C.D York Junior High School

==== Intermediate schools (5–6) ====
- Katherine J. Clark Intermediate School
- Tom Cox Intermediate School

==== Elementary schools (PK–4) ====
- Kacy Arnold Elementary School
- Birnham Woods Elementary School
- Lucille J. Bradley Elementary School
- Sue Park Broadway Elementary School
- A. Davis Ford Elementary School (partial - some students zoned to Oak Ridge)
- Christopher J. Hines Elementary School
- Ann K. Snyder Elementary School

=== Other schools ===
- Washington High School - Alternative school
- Juvenile Justice Alternative Education Program (JJAEP) - Montgomery County operates the program in partnership with CISD.

== Former schools ==
- Booker T. Washington High School - School for black students in the pre-desegregation era. It became the alternative school.

== Board of Trustees ==
- President, Position 3: Mrs. Misty Odenweller
- Vice President, Position 2: Mrs. Melissa Dungan
- Secretary, Position 5: Mrs. Lindsay Dawson
- Assistant Secretary, Position 7: Mrs. Marianne Horton
- Trustee, Position 1, Mrs. Aggie Gambino
- Trustee, Position 4: Mrs. Nicole May
- Trustee, Position 6: Mrs. Melissa Semmler

(As of August 2026)

== See also ==
- List of school districts in Texas
