= Oak Ridge North, Texas =

City in Montgomery County, Texas, United States

- City
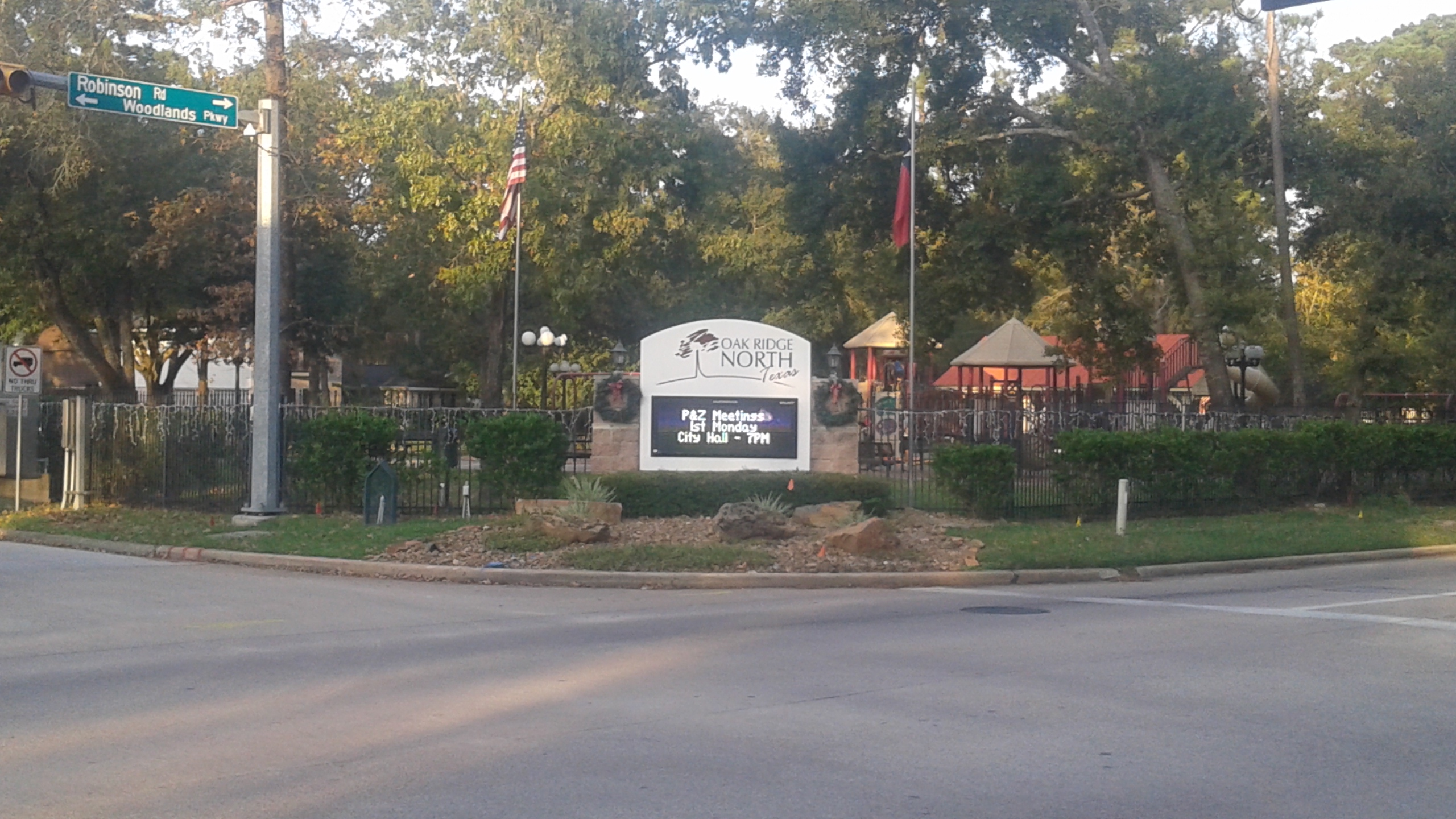
- Welcome sign at Teddy Bear Park

- Oak Ridge North within Montgomery County

- Location in Texas Location in the United States
- Coordinates: 30°9′37″N 95°26′40″W
- Country: United States
- State: Texas
- Counties: Montgomery

Government
  - Type: Council-Manager
  - Mayor: Paul Bond
  - City Council: Rick Moffatt; Holly McClaren; Alex Jones (Mayor Pro Tem); Heather Smoot; Frances Planchard
  - City Manager: Heather Neeley
  - City Secretary: Elizabeth Harrell

Area
  - Total: 1.45 sq mi (3.75 km^{2})
  - Land: 1.45 sq mi (3.75 km^{2})
  - Water: 0 sq mi (0.00 km^{2})
- Elevation: 138 ft (42 m)

Population (2020)
  - Total: 3,057
  - Density: 2,186.0/sq mi (844.01/km^{2})
- Time zone: UTC-6 (Central (CST))
  - Summer (DST): UTC-5 (CDT)
- FIPS code: 48-53190
- GNIS feature ID: 1388600
- Website: www.oakridgenorth.com

Oak Ridge North (commonly referred to as Oak Ridge) is a city in Montgomery County, Texas, United States. It is located along Interstate 45 10 miles (16 km) south of Conroe and 35 miles (56.3 km) north of Houston. The population was 3,057 at the 2020 census.

== Geography ==
Oak Ridge North is located at 30°9′31″N 95°26′39″W (30.158702, –95.444084).

According to the United States Census Bureau, the city has a total area of 1.1 square miles (2.8 km^{2}), all land.

== Demographics ==
As of the 2020 census, there were 3,057 people and 953 families residing in the city.

=== 2020 census ===
The median age was 47.3 years. 20.3% of residents were under the age of 18 and 23.8% of residents were 65 years of age or older. For every 100 females there were 95.1 males, and for every 100 females age 18 and over there were 95.6 males age 18 and over.

100.0% of residents lived in urban areas, while 0.0% lived in rural areas.

There were 1,121 households in Oak Ridge North, of which 31.2% had children under the age of 18 living in them. Of all households, 66.9% were married-couple households, 11.4% were households with a male householder and no spouse or partner present, and 19.4% were households with a female householder and no spouse or partner present. About 15.5% of all households were made up of individuals and 8.9% had someone living alone who was 65 years of age or older.

There were 1,171 housing units, of which 4.3% were vacant. The homeowner vacancy rate was 1.2% and the rental vacancy rate was 11.2%.

Racial composition as of the 2020 census
Race	Number	Percent
White	2,417	79.1%
Black or African American	64	2.1%
American Indian and Alaska Native	10	0.3%
Asian	87	2.8%
Native Hawaiian and Other Pacific Islander	2	0.1%
Some other race	145	4.7%
Two or more races	332	10.9%
Hispanic or Latino (of any race)	466	15.2%

Historical population
Census	Pop.	Note	%±
1980	2,504		—
1990	2,454		−2.0%
2000	2,991		21.9%
2010	3,049		1.9%
2020	3,057		0.3%
U.S. Decennial Census

=== 2010 census ===
As of the 2010 census, there were 3,049 people, 1131 households, and 909 families residing in the city. The population density was 2,771.8 inhabitants per square mile (1,070.2/km^{2}). There were 1,131 housing units at an average density of 1,028.2 per square mile (397.0/km^{2}). The racial makeup of the city was 93.8% White, 1.3% African American, 0.4% Native American, 1.2% Asian, 1.5% from other races, and 1.7% from two or more races. Hispanic or Latino of any race were 10.2% of the population.

There were 1131 households, out of which 27.1% had children under the age of 18 living with them. 70.7% were married couples living together, 6.8% had a female householder with no husband present, and 19.6% were non-families. 15.9% of all households were made up of individuals. The average household size was 2.69 and the average family size was 3.01.

In the city, the population was spread out, with 20.8% under the age of 18, 6.9% from 18 to 24, 19.8% from 25 to 44, 34.8% from 45 to 64, and 17.6% who were 65 years of age or older. The median age was 46.7 years. For every 100 females, there were 99.0 males. For every 100 females age 18 and over, there were 96.4 males.

=== American Community Survey ===
In the 2015 American Community Survey, the median income for a household in the city was $88,500, and the median income for a family was $99,250. Males had a median income of $89,167 versus $41,917 for females. The per capita income for the city was $40,267. About 5.1% of families and 6.1% of the population were below the poverty line, including 15.3% of those under age 18 and 3.6% of those age 65 or over.

== History ==
In 1964, the Arkansas-based Spring Pines Corporation purchased a large tract of land containing what is now Oak Ridge North with the intention of creating a subdivision along Interstate 45. United Diversified, Inc. took over the development in 1969. Associated Properties Company, which became the chief developer in 1971, added more land to the subdivision.

In the 1970s, as Houston began annexing territories closer to the border of Montgomery County, many residents expressed concern about the possibility of their community being annexed. As a result, the community voted in favor of incorporation in 1979.

== Government ==
Oak Ridge North is governed locally by a mayor and five-member city council. All members are at-large. As of June 2022, the mayor is Paul Bond. The city council members are Rick Moffatt, Clint McClaren, Alex Jones, Dawn Candy, and Frances Planchard. Alex Jones also serves as Mayor pro tem. Oak Ridge North operates a council-manager form of government, which delegates the administrative tasks of the government to a city manager appointed by the city council. As of June 2022, the city manager is Heather Neeley.

In the Texas Senate, Oak Ridge North is in District 4, represented by Republican Brandon Creighton. In the Texas House of Representatives, Oak Ridge North is in District 15, represented by Republican Steve Toth.

In the United States Senate, Republicans John Cornyn and Ted Cruz represent the entire state of Texas. In the United States House of Representatives, Oak Ridge North is in District 8, represented by Morgan Luttrell.

== Education ==
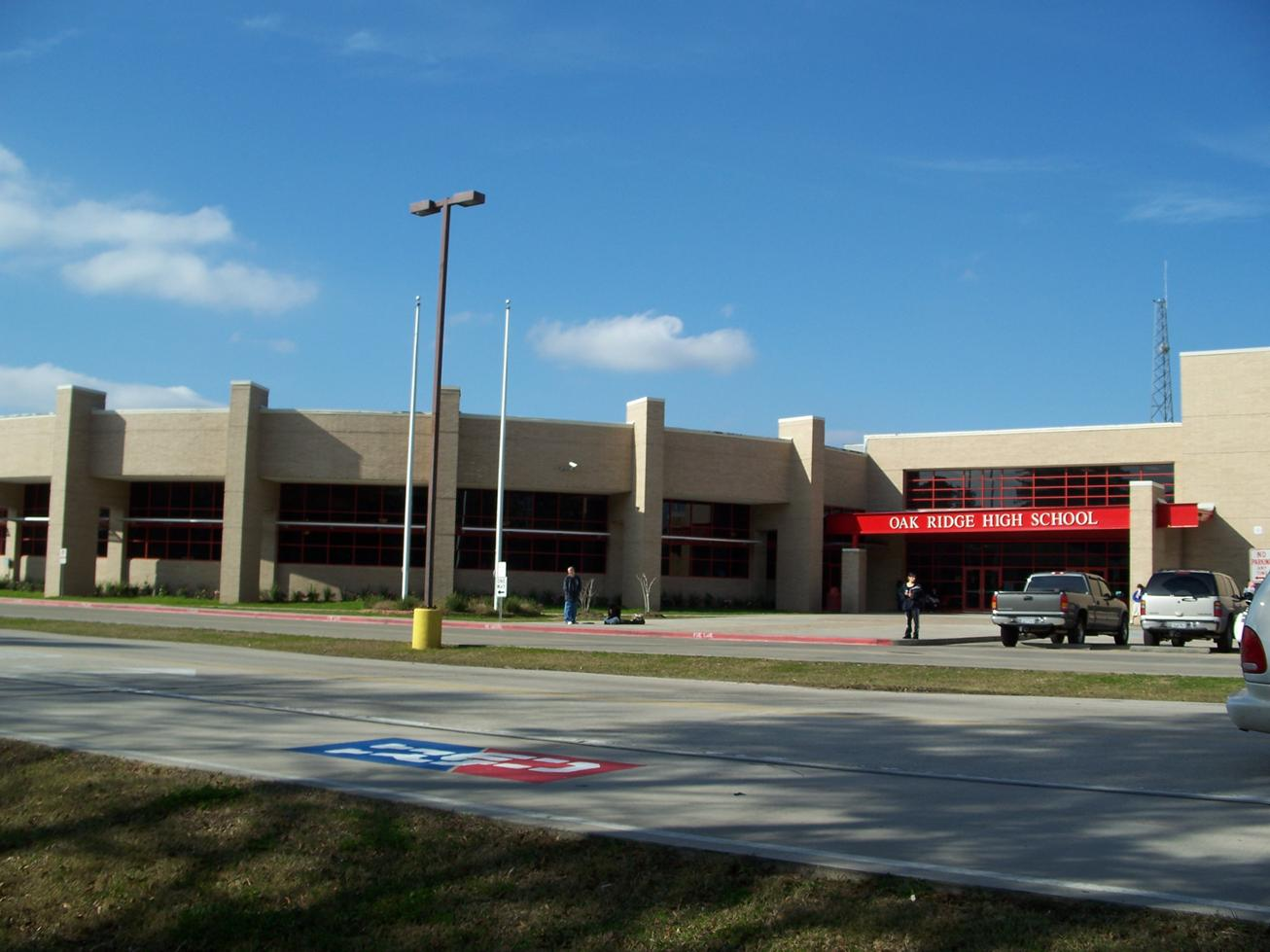
Oak Ridge High School

Oak Ridge North is served by the Conroe Independent School District.

Students from this city feed into Oak Ridge Elementary School, Vogel Intermediate School, Irons Junior High School, and Oak Ridge High School.

The city is also a part of the Lone Star College System.

== See also ==
- List of municipalities in Texas
