= Chateau Woods, Texas =

Unincorporated community in Texas, US

Coordinates: 30°10′07″N 95°25′23″W

Chateau Woods is an unincorporated community in southern Montgomery County, Texas, United States, that was formerly an incorporated municipality. It is located east of Interstate 45, approximately 10 miles (16 km) south of Conroe and 27 miles (43 km) north of Houston.

== History ==
Residential development of the area began in the 1960s with the building of a subdivision known as Lake Chateau Woods. A civic club was formed during the late 1960s that eventually pursued incorporation to improve infrastructure in the area. Residents voted in favor of incorporating the community on December 6, 1975. The following year, a mayor (Leon Kennedy) and five aldermen were elected to serve the newly created village. Using state bonds, a multimillion-dollar sewer system was constructed. In the 1980 Census, Chateau Woods had a population of 590. That same year, aldermen voted to change its status from a "village" to a "city." By 1990, the population had risen to 641.

Although the local government tried to maintain unpaved roads in the city by laying down gravel, the streets deteriorated on an annual basis. During dry spells, travel on the unpaved streets would stir up thick clouds of dust, while rain caused the streets to become muddy and nearly impassable. Officials had planned to pave the roads, but wanted to wait until the sewer bonds were fully paid off. Had they proceeded immediately, residents would have faced higher tax rates. As frustration among residents grew, calls for the city to rejoin unincorporated Montgomery County gained popularity in the early 1990s. A slate of candidates who supported that idea were elected and on August 14, 1993, citizens voted to dis-incorporate and form a Municipal Utility District (MUD). The Municipal Utility District was formed to maintain the area's septic system and ensure that the state was reimbursed – which it was, several years later.

An estimated 1,091 people lived in the Chateau Woods area in 2000.

== Education ==
The community is in the Conroe Independent School District.

Residents are zoned to Houser Elementary School, Vogel Intermediate School, Irons Junior High School, and Oak Ridge High School.
