= Montgomery County, Texas =

County in Texas, United States

- County
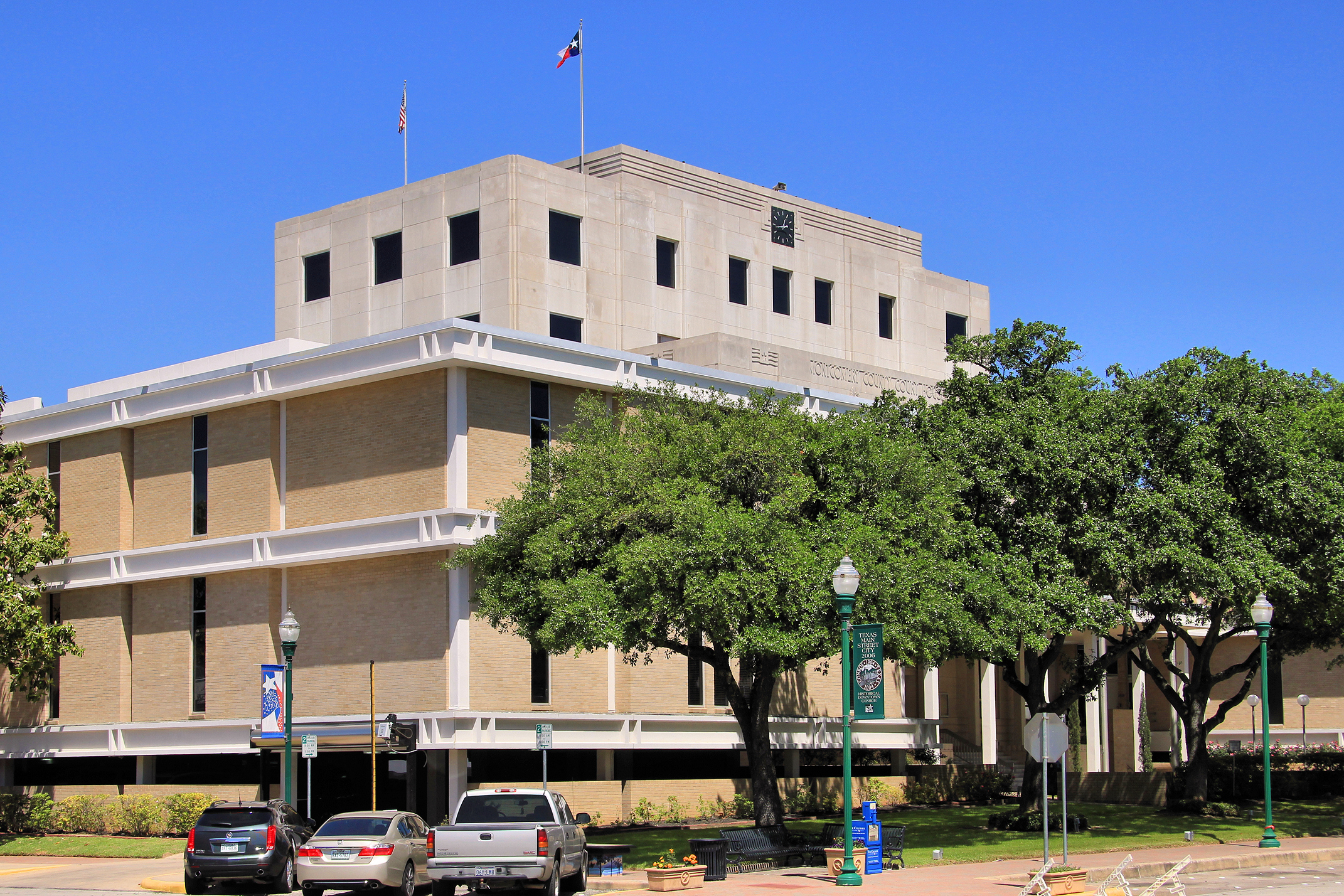
- The Montgomery County Courthouse in Conroe

- Location within the U.S. state of Texas
- Coordinates: 30.298801°N 95.50295°W
- Country: United States
- State: Texas
- Founded: December 14, 1837
- Named for: Montgomery, Texas
- Seat: Conroe
- Largest community: The Woodlands

Government
  - County judge: Mark Keough

Area
  - Total: 1,076.885 sq mi (2,789.12 km^{2})
  - Land: 1,042.179 sq mi (2,699.23 km^{2})
  - Water: 34.706 sq mi (89.89 km^{2}) 3.22%

Population (2020)
  - Total: 620,443
  - Estimate (2025): 781,194 ▲
  - Density: 719.239/sq mi (277.700/km^{2})
- Time zone: UTC−6 (Central)
  - Summer (DST): UTC−5 (CDT)
- Area code: 281, 346, 621, 713, 832, and 936
- Congressional districts: 2nd, 8th
- Website: www.mctx.org

Montgomery County is a county in the U.S. state of Texas. As of the 2020 census, the population was 620,443, and was estimated to be 781,194 in 2025. Its county seat is Conroe. Montgomery County is part of the Houston–Pasadena–The Woodlands metropolitan statistical area.

== History ==
The county was created by an act of the Congress of the Republic of Texas on December 14, 1837, and is named for the town of Montgomery.

== Geography ==
According to the United States Census Bureau, the county has a total area of 1,076.885 square miles (2,789.12 km^{2}), of which 34.706 sq mi (89.89 km^{2}) (3.22%) are covered by water. It is the 65th largest county in Texas by total area.

=== Adjacent counties ===
- Walker County (north)
- San Jacinto County (northeast)
- Liberty County (east)
- Harris County (south)
- Waller County (west)
- Grimes County (northwest)

== Demographics ==
Historical population
Census	Pop.	Note	%±
1850	2,384		—
1860	5,479		129.8%
1870	6,483		18.3%
1880	10,154		56.6%
1890	11,765		15.9%
1900	17,067		45.1%
1910	15,679		−8.1%
1920	17,334		10.6%
1930	14,588		−15.8%
1940	23,055		58.0%
1950	24,504		6.3%
1960	26,839		9.5%
1970	49,479		84.4%
1980	128,487		159.7%
1990	182,201		41.8%
2000	293,768		61.2%
2010	455,746		55.1%
2020	620,443		36.1%
2025 (est.)	781,194	▲	25.9%
U.S. Decennial Census; 1850–1900 1910; 1920 1930 1940; 1950 1960 1970; 1980 1990 2000; 2010 2020

As of the fourth quarter of 2024, the median home value in Montgomery County was $371,646.

As of the 2023 American Community Survey, an estimated 235,474 households in Montgomery County have an average of 2.77 persons per household. The county has a median household income of $97,266. About 10.1% of the county's population lives at or below the poverty line. Montgomery County has an estimated 64.6% employment rate, with 37.9% of the population holding a bachelor's degree or higher and 90.2% holding a high-school diploma.

The top-five reported ancestries (people were allowed to report up to two ancestries, thus the figures will generally add to more than 100%) were English (73.0%), Spanish (21.3%), Indo-European (2.8%), Asian and Pacific Islander (1.9%), and other (1.0%). The median age in the county was 37.3 years.

=== Racial and ethnic composition ===
Montgomery County, Texas – Racial and ethnic composition Note: the US Census treats Hispanic/Latino as an ethnic category. This table excludes Latinos from the racial categories and assigns them to a separate category. Hispanics/Latinos may be of any race.
Race / Ethnicity (NH = Non-Hispanic)	Pop 1980	Pop 1990	Pop 2000	Pop 2010	Pop 2020	% 1980	% 1990	% 2000	% 2010	% 2020
White alone (NH)	117,290	159,436	239,150	324,611	371,403	91.29%	87.51%	81.41%	71.23%	59.86%
Black or African American alone (NH)	6,117	7,659	10,076	18,537	34,177	4.76%	4.20%	3.43%	4.07%	5.51%
Native American or Alaska Native alone (NH)	262	646	1,118	9,347	1,884	0.20%	0.35%	0.38%	0.40%	0.30%
Asian alone (NH)	358	1,143	3,167	9,347	21,436	0.28%	0.63%	1.08%	2.05%	3.45%
Native Hawaiian or Pacific Islander alone (NH)	x	x	80	241	634	x	x	0.03%	0.05%	0.10%
Other race alone (NH)	171	80	281	635	2,522	0.13%	0.04%	0.10%	0.14%	0.41%
Multiracial (NH)	x	x	2,746	5,870	24,298	x	x	0.93%	1.29%	3.92%
Hispanic or Latino (any race)	4,289	13,237	37,150	94,698	164,089	3.34%	7.27%	12.65%	20.78%	26.45%
Total	128,487	182,201	293,768	455,746	620,443	100.00%	100.00%	100.00%	100.00%	100.00%

=== American Community Survey 2025 data ===
The United States Census Bureau estimated that in 2025, Montgomery County’s population was 781.194. It was also estimated that the county's population was 54.27% Non-Hispanic White, 30.17% Hispanic or Latino, 7.82% Non-Hispanic Black, 4.23% Asian, 0.30% Native American, 0.11% Pacific Islander, and 3.09% Multiracial.

Total	Population	Percentage
Non-Hispanic White	423,991	54.27%
Hispanic or Latino	235,712	30.17%
Non-Hispanic Black	61,120	7.82%
Asian	33,072	4.23%
Native American	2,312	0.30%
Pacific Islander	827	0.11%
Non-Hispanic Multiracial	24,160	3.09%

=== 2020 census ===
As of the 2020 census, 620,443 people, 219,796 households, and 164,212 families resided in the county. The population density was 595.3 inhabitants per square mile (229.8/km^{2}).

The median age was 37.2 years, 26.1% of residents were under the age of 18, and 13.9% of residents were 65 years of age or older. For every 100 females there were 97.1 males, and for every 100 females age 18 and over there were 94.7 males age 18 and over.

The racial makeup of the county was 65.7% White, 5.7% Black or African American, 1.0% American Indian and Alaska Native, 3.5% Asian, 0.1% Native Hawaiian and Pacific Islander, 10.3% from some other race, and 13.6% from two or more races. Hispanic or Latino residents of any race comprised 26.4% of the population.

77.1% of residents lived in urban areas, while 22.9% lived in rural areas.

There were 219,796 households in the county, of which 38.0% had children under the age of 18 living in them. Of all households, 57.7% were married-couple households, 14.9% were households with a male householder and no spouse or partner present, and 22.0% were households with a female householder and no spouse or partner present. About 20.8% of all households were made up of individuals and 7.9% had someone living alone who was 65 years of age or older.

There were 238,489 housing units, of which 7.8% were vacant. Among occupied housing units, 71.3% were owner-occupied and 28.7% were renter-occupied. The homeowner vacancy rate was 1.8% and the rental vacancy rate was 10.5%.

=== 2010 census ===
As of the 2010 census, 455,746 people, 162,530 households, and 121,472 families lived in the county. The population density was 423 people per square mile (163 people/km^{2}). The 177,647 housing units had an average density of 165 per square mile (64/km^{2}).

In 2010, the racial makeup of the county was 83.5% White, 4.3% Black or African American, 0.7% Native American, 2.1% Asian, 0.1% Pacific Islander, 7.0% from other races, and 2.3% from two or more races. About 20.8% of the population were Hispanics or Latinos of any race.

At the 2010 census, of the 162,530 households, 36.2% had children under 18 living with them, 59.5% were married couples living together, 10.6% had a female householder with no husband present, 4.7% had a male householder with no wife present, and 25.3% were not families. About 20.6% of all households were made up of individuals, and 6.5% had someone living alone who was 65 or older. The average household size was 2.78 and the average family size was 3.22.

In the county, the age distribution was 27.6% under 18, 8.0% from 18 to 24, 27.4% from 25 to 44, 26.6% from 45 to 64, and 10.4% who were 65 or older. The median age was 36.1 years. For every 100 females, there were 98.29 males. For every 100 females 18 and over, there were 95.94 males.

=== 2000 census ===
As of the 2000 census, the median income for a household in the county was $50,864 and for a family was $58,983. Males had a median income of $42,400 versus $28,270 for females. The per capita income for the county was $24,544. About 7.1% of families and 9.4% of the population were below the poverty line, including 10.9% of those under 18 and 10.1% of those 65 or over.

=== National protected area ===
- Sam Houston National Forest (partial)

== Communities ==
=== Cities ===
==== Multiple counties ====
- Cleveland (most of the city is in Liberty County)
- Houston (most of the city is in Harris County)

==== Montgomery County only ====
- Conroe (county seat)
- Cut and Shoot
- Magnolia
- Montgomery
- Oak Ridge North
- Panorama Village
- Patton Village
- Roman Forest
- Shenandoah
- Splendora
- Willis
- Woodbranch

=== Towns ===
- Stagecoach
- Woodloch

=== Census-designated places ===
- Grangerland
- Pinehurst
- Porter Heights
- The Woodlands (small part of the CDP located in Harris County)

=== Unincorporated communities ===
- Chateau Woods (former city)
- Decker Prairie
- Dobbin
- Egypt
- Imperial Oaks
- New Caney
- Porter
- River Plantation
- Spring (larger part in Harris County, which includes the CDP part)
- Tamina

== Education ==
=== Public schools ===
Several school districts operate public schools in the county:

- Conroe ISD
- Magnolia ISD
- Montgomery ISD
- New Caney ISD
- Richards ISD (partial)
- Splendora ISD
- Tomball ISD (partial)
- Willis ISD
- Humble ISD (partial)
- Cleveland ISD (partial)

=== Private schools ===
Pre-K to 12

- Covenant Christian School
- Christ Community School
- Esprit International School
- The Woodlands Christian Academy
- The John Cooper School
- The Woodlands Preparatory School
- Porter Christian Academy
- Cunae International School
- Legacy Preparatory Christian Academy
- Willis Classical Academy

Pre-K to 8

- St. Anthony Of Padua Catholic School of the Roman Catholic Archdiocese of Galveston-Houston

The closest Catholic high school is Frassati Catholic High School in north Harris County; the planners of the school intended for it to serve The Woodlands.

=== Colleges and universities ===
The county is also home to two campuses of the Lone Star College System (formerly North Harris-Montgomery Community College District): Montgomery and The University Center.

Lone Star College's service area under Texas law includes, in Montgomery County: Conroe, Magnolia, Montgomery, New Caney, Splendora, Tomball, and Willis ISDs. The portion in Richards ISD is zoned to Blinn Junior College District.

Former colleges for black students in the pre-desegregation era included Conroe Normal and Industrial College and Royal College.

== Politics ==
Montgomery County has given Republican candidates 70 percent or more of the vote since 2000, and a Democratic presidential candidate has not won the county since 1964, when native Texan and favorite son Lyndon Johnson won 60.9% of the county's vote.

In 2004, county voters gave 78.1 percent of their vote to Republican candidate George W. Bush, who served as Governor of Texas from 1995 to 2000. In 2008, 75.8% of the voters supported the Republican ticket of John McCain and Sarah Palin.

In 2016, Montgomery County was the only county in the United States where Republican nominee Donald Trump won against Democratic nominee Hillary Clinton by a margin of greater than 100,000 votes. In 2020, Trump won Montgomery County again, with an expanded margin of 119,000 votes. In 2024, Trump won Montgomery County once again, with another expanded margin of about 140,000 votes.

United States presidential election results for Montgomery County, Texas
Year	Republican		Democratic		Third party(ies)	
Year	No.	%	No.	%	No.	%
1912	120	12.67%	613	64.73%	214	22.60%
1916	197	16.13%	880	72.07%	144	11.79%
1920	203	14.00%	935	64.48%	312	21.52%
1924	166	9.83%	1,500	88.81%	23	1.36%
1928	613	40.36%	905	59.58%	1	0.07%
1932	126	6.00%	1,971	93.90%	2	0.10%
1936	186	7.05%	2,443	92.61%	9	0.34%
1940	408	10.87%	3,347	89.13%	0	0.00%
1944	219	6.05%	2,902	80.17%	499	13.78%
1948	544	16.30%	1,795	53.77%	999	29.93%
1952	2,969	46.32%	3,432	53.54%	9	0.14%
1956	3,360	56.24%	2,572	43.05%	42	0.70%
1960	3,309	47.70%	3,510	50.60%	118	1.70%
1964	3,167	38.64%	4,989	60.87%	40	0.49%
1968	4,353	32.84%	4,021	30.34%	4,881	36.82%
1972	15,067	77.48%	4,358	22.41%	22	0.11%
1976	15,739	53.07%	13,718	46.25%	202	0.68%
1980	26,237	65.64%	12,593	31.51%	1,141	2.85%
1984	41,230	75.39%	13,293	24.31%	167	0.31%
1988	40,360	68.24%	18,394	31.10%	392	0.66%
1992	39,976	51.28%	18,551	23.80%	19,431	24.92%
1996	51,011	65.23%	20,722	26.50%	6,469	8.27%
2000	80,600	75.89%	23,286	21.92%	2,327	2.19%
2004	104,654	78.11%	28,628	21.37%	706	0.53%
2008	119,884	75.76%	36,703	23.19%	1,664	1.05%
2012	137,969	79.51%	32,920	18.97%	2,634	1.52%
2016	150,314	73.00%	45,835	22.26%	9,755	4.74%
2020	193,382	71.22%	74,377	27.39%	3,784	1.39%
2024	221,964	72.24%	82,277	26.78%	3,017	0.98%

United States Senate election results for Montgomery County, Texas1
Year	Republican		Democratic		Third party(ies)	
Year	No.	%	No.	%	No.	%
2024	213,797	69.75%	86,879	28.34%	5,841	1.91%

United States Senate election results for Montgomery County, Texas2
Year	Republican		Democratic		Third party(ies)	
Year	No.	%	No.	%	No.	%
2020	194,528	72.36%	68,254	25.39%	6,056	2.25%
2026	155,781	60.25%	98,324	38.03%	4,437	1.72%

Texas Gubernatorial election results for Montgomery County
Year	Republican		Democratic		Third party(ies)	
Year	No.	%	No.	%	No.	%
2022	152,694	73.39%	52,654	25.31%	2,707	1.30%
2026	162,155	62.60%	93,048	35.92%	3,824	1.48%

=== Commissioners' court ===
Commissioners	Name	Party	First Elected	Communities Represented
County Judge	Mark Keough	Republican	2018	Countywide
Precinct 1	Robert C. Walker	Republican	2020	North County (including Conroe)
Precinct 2	Charlie Riley	Republican	2014	Southwestern County
Precinct 3	Ritch Wheeler	Republican	2024	Southern central county (including The Woodlands)
Precinct 4	Matt Gray	Republican	2024	Eastern county

=== County officials ===
Office	Name	Party
County Attorney	B. D. Griffin	Republican
County Clerk	L. Brandon Steinmann	Republican
District Attorney	Michael R. Holley	Republican
District Clerk	Melisa Miller	Republican
Sheriff	Wesley Doolittle	Republican
Tax Assessor-Collector	Tammy J. McRae	Republican
Treasurer	Melanie Bush	Republican

=== United States Congress ===
Senators	Name	Party	First Elected	Level
Senate Class 1	Ted Cruz	Republican	2012	Junior Senator
Senate Class 2	John Cornyn	Republican	2002	Senior Senator
Representatives	Name	Party	First Elected	Area(s) of Montgomery County Represented
District 2	Dan Crenshaw	Republican	2018	South county
District 8	Morgan Luttrell	Republican	2020	West and north county

=== Texas Legislature ===
==== Texas Senate ====
District	Name	Party	First Elected	Area(s) of Montgomery County Represented
4	Brett Ligon	Republican	Special election 2026	Central and eastern (including The Woodlands and Conroe)
7	Paul Bettencourt	Republican	2014	Southwestern county
18	Lois Kolkhorst	Republican	Special election 2014	Western county including, Magnolia

==== Texas House of Representatives ====
District	Name	Party	First Elected	Area(s) of Montgomery County Represented
3	Cecil Bell Jr.	Republican	2012	Southwest to southeast
15	Steve Toth	Republican	2014	South (including The Woodlands)
16	Will Metcalf	Republican	2014	North and east (including Conroe)
18	Janis Holt	Republican	2025	Sliver of Eastern county

== Libraries ==
The county operates the Montgomery County Memorial Library System. The public library system has been the subject of multiple book banning controversies, including a change to the book review process lobbied by local right-wing group Two Moms and Some Books that removed librarians from the review process. Under this new policy, any children books challenged but immediate be placed in the adult sections.

== Healthcare and animal services ==
In 1938, the Montgomery County Hospital, a public institution, opened, the first public hospital in the county. It had 25 beds. The Montgomery County Hospital District opened in the 1970s, and the purpose of the district was making a new hospital, which opened in 1982 and replaced the former hospital.

The Montgomery County Animal Shelter is in an unincorporated area, with a Conroe address. The City of Conroe has its own animal shelter. The City of Houston animal shelter, The Bureau of Animal Regulation and Control (BARC), is in Harris County.

== Transportation ==
=== Airports ===
Conroe-North Houston Regional Airport, a general aviation airport, is located in Conroe.

The Houston Airport System stated that Montgomery County is within the primary service area of George Bush Intercontinental Airport, an international airport in Houston in Harris County.

=== Major highways ===
- Interstate 45
- Interstate 69/U.S. Highway 59
- State Highway 75
- State Highway 99 - Grand Parkway Toll Road
- State Highway 105
- State Highway 242
- State Highway 249 - a.k.a. MCTRA 249 Tollway (from Spring Creek to Pinehurst) and the Aggie Expressway (Pinehurst up to Todd Mission)
- Loop 336
- Loop 494

=== Toll roads ===
Montgomery County has several toll roads within its borders, most of which are operated as "pass-through toll roads" or shadow toll roads.

There are two "true" toll roads within Montgomery County. One toll road consists of a section of mainlanes of State Highway 249 between the Harris County line at Spring Creek to FM 1774 in Pinehurst and is signed as MCTRA 249 Tollway (maintained by the Montgomery County Toll Road Authority). North of Pinehurst, the toll road continues as the TxDOT maintained Aggie Expressway (SH 249 Toll) up north to FM 1774 near Todd Mission then as a two-lane freeway up to State Highway 105 near Navasota. The other toll road within Montgomery County (also maintained by TxDOT) is Grand Parkway (State Highway 99) between the Harris County line at Spring Creek, with an interchange at I-69/US 59 near New Caney, and reentering Harris County before continuing into Liberty and Chambers Counties.

== See also ==
- List of museums in the Texas Gulf Coast
- Earth Quest Adventures
- National Register of Historic Places listings in Montgomery County, Texas
- Recorded Texas Historic Landmarks in Montgomery County
