= Middleton (name) =

Origin
- Origin: England and Scotland
- Meaning: "middle"/"town"
- Region of origin: Anglo-Saxon

Middleton is a locational Anglo-Saxon surname originating from dozens of different settlements in England going by one of the pre-7th-century Old English variations of "middle" (such as midel) and "town" (such as tun). The earliest recorded examples of such hamlets date to 1086 and include Middeltone, Mideltuna, and Middeltune in such Derbyshire, Shropshire, Sussex, and Yorkshire. The surname "Mideltone" is recorded in Oxfordshire (1166), "Midilton" is noted in Arbroath, Scotland (1221) and "Middelton" is found in Yorkshire (1273).

== Actors and entertainers ==
- Briana Middleton, American actress
- Clark Middleton (1957–2020), American actor
- Dan Middleton (born 1991), British YouTube personality
- Edwin Middleton (1865–1929), American film director
- Lindsey Middleton (born 1991), Canadian actress
- Margaret Yvonne Middleton (1922–2007), better known under her stage name Yvonne De Carlo, Canadian actress
- Qaasim Middleton (born 1995), American actor, singer and musician
- Ray Middleton (1907–1984), American singer and stage, TV and movie actor
- Tuppence Middleton (born 1987), English actress

== Athletes ==
- Archibald Middleton (1876–1945), Australian rules footballer
- Arelle Middleton (born 2008), American Paralympic athlete
- Bay Middleton (1846–1892), British horseman
- Barry Middleton (born 1984), field hockey player for England and Great Britain
- Bonnor Middleton (1865–1913), South African cricketer
- Cecil Middleton (1911–1984), English cricketer
- Darryl Middleton (born 1966), American-Spanish basketball player
- Derek Middleton (born 1934), English professional footballer
- Eilidh Middleton (born 1990), equestrian competitor from Scotland
- Frank Middleton (footballer) (1879–1943), English footballer
- Garry Middleton (1948–1994), Australian motorcycle racer
- Glenn Middleton (born 2000), Scottish footballer
- Graham Middleton (1950–2011), Australian Rules footballer
- Jacob Middleton (born 1996), Canadian ice hockey player
- Keynan Middleton (born 1993), American baseball player
- Khris Middleton (born 1991), American basketball player
- Lloyd Middleton, former Australian Rules footballer
- Safia Middleton-Patel (born 2004), Welsh footballer
- Sterling Middleton (born 1998), Canadian curler

== Musicians ==
- Darren Middleton (born 1971), Australian lead guitarist for alternative rock band Powderfinger
- Amari Deshawn Adham Middleton (Born 2003) American rapper, songwriter and record producer
- Hubert Stanley Middleton (1890–1959), cathedral organist
- Malcolm Middleton (born 1973), Scottish musician
- Max Middleton (born 1946), English composer and keyboardist
- Scott Middleton, Canadian musician, former guitarist of the hardcore punk band Cancer Bats
- Tim Middleton (born 1969), better known as DJ U-Neek, American hip-hop producer
- Tom Middleton (born 1971), British recording artist, music producer, remixer and DJ

== Politicians ==
- Andrew C. Middleton (1824–1909), American politician in the state of New York
- Arthur Middleton (1742-1787), Founding Father of the United States from South Carolina
- Clay Middleton (born 1981 or 1982), American politician and military leader
- Clyde Middleton (1928–2019), American politician in the state of Kentucky
- Lisa Middleton (born 1952), American politician
- Mark-Anthony Middleton, American politician

== Writers ==
- Christopher Middleton (poet) (1926–2015), British poet and translator
- Edgar Middleton (1894–1939), British playwright and author
- Erasmus Middleton (1739–1805), English clergyman, author and editor
- Ian Middleton (1928–2007), New Zealand novelist
- O. E. Middleton (Osman Edward Middleton, 1925–2010), New Zealand short story writer
- Richard Barham Middleton (1882–1911), British author and poet
- Richard of Middleton (c. 1249–c. 1308), Scholastic philosopher
- Sheena Booth Middleton (born 1947), better known as Sheena Blackhall, Scottish writer
- Stanley Middleton (1919–2009), British novelist
- Thomas Middleton (1580–1627), English playwright

== Disambiguation pages ==
- Arthur Middleton (disambiguation), several people
- Charles Middleton (disambiguation), several people
- David Middleton (disambiguation), several people
- George Middleton (disambiguation), several people
- Henry Middleton (disambiguation), several people
- Jack Middleton (disambiguation), several people named Jack
- James Middleton (disambiguation), several people named James and Jim
- John Middleton (disambiguation), several people
- Karen Middleton (disambiguation), several people
- Kate Middleton (disambiguation), several people
- Peter Middleton (disambiguation), several people
- Robert Middleton (disambiguation), several people
- Thomas Middleton (disambiguation), several people
- William Middleton (disambiguation), several people

== Other people ==
- Middleton family, the family of orientation of Catherine, Princess of Wales
  - Catherine, Princess of Wales (Catherine Elizabeth; born 1982), Princess of Wales by marriage to Prince William
  - Carole Middleton (born 1955), British businesswoman and mother of Catherine, Princess of Wales
  - James Middleton (born 1987), British entrepreneur and brother of Catherine, Princess of Wales
  - Michael Middleton (born 1949), British businessman and father of Catherine, Princess of Wales
  - Pippa Middleton (born 1983), British columnist and sister of Catherine, Princess of Wales
- Ant Middleton (born 1980), former British soldier, adventurer and television presenter
- Audrey Valentine Middleton, birth name of Lee Everett Alkin or "Lady Lee" (1937–2022), British pop singer, psychic, spiritual healer
- Campbell Middleton, Australian engineer
- C. H. Middleton (Cecil Henry Middleton, 1886–1945), gardener, writer and radio broadcaster
- Colin Middleton (1910–1983), Irish artist and surrealist
- Conyers Middleton (1683–1750), an English clergyman
- Edward Middleton (1810–1883), US Navy Rear Admiral
- Elizabeth Smith Middleton (1814–1898), British-born Canadian social reformer
- Eva Middleton (1953–2018), Belizean disability rights activist
- Faith Middleton (born 1948), American radio journalist
- Frederick Dobson Middleton (1825–1898), Canadian militia leader
- Gerard V. Middleton (1931–2021), South African-born Canadian geologist and sedimentologist
- Humphrey Middleton, 16th-century English Protestant martyr
- Jenna Middleton, fictional character in Degrassi: The Next Generation
- Joshua Middleton, comic book artist
- Mary Middleton (1870–1911), British political activist
- Nick Middleton (born 1960), English physical geographer
- R. Hunter Middleton (1898–1985), American book designer, painter, and type designer
- Robbie Middleton (1990–2011), American boy who was raped and torched on his eighth birthday, dying of complications 13 years later
- Ron Middleton (VC) (1916–1942), Australian Victoria Cross recipient
- Troy Houston Middleton (1889–1976), Lieutenant General during World War II

== See also ==
- Baron Middleton, title in the British Peerage
- Earl of Middleton, title in the Peerage of Scotland
- Middleton baronets, one of several hereditary titles in England, Great Britain and the United Kingdom
- Myddelton
- Myddleton
- Sir Hugh Myddelton (1560–1631), goldsmith, entrepreneur, drainer of Brading Harbour and developer of the New River, London
- Clan Middleton, Scottish clan
