= Middleton =

Middleton may refer to:

== People ==
- Middleton (name), list of notable people with surname of Middleton
  - Middleton family, English family that married into the British royal family.
- Viscount Midleton, sometimes spelt Middleton, Irish peerage of the Brodrick family

== Places ==
=== Australia ===
- Middleton, Queensland
- Middleton, South Australia
- Middleton, Tasmania, on the D'Entrecasteaux Channel
- Middleton Beach, Western Australia
- Middleton Reef, Tasman Sea

=== Canada ===
- Middleton, Nova Scotia
- Middleton, Ontario

=== Ireland ===
- Midleton, County Cork

=== New Zealand ===
- Middleton, New Zealand, a suburb of Christchurch
- Lake Middleton, a small lake in the South Island of New Zealand

=== South Africa ===
- Middleton, Eastern Cape, a hamlet

=== United Kingdom ===
==== England ====
Buckinghamshire

- Middleton, Milton Keynes

County Durham

- Middleton, Hartlepool
- Middleton One Row
- Middleton St George
- Middleton-in-Teesdale

Cumbria

- Middleton, Cumbria

Derbyshire

- Middleton-by-Wirksworth
  - Middleton Incline, a former railway incline
  - Middleton railway station (Derbyshire)
- Middleton-by-Youlgreave

Dorset

- Middleton, Dorset

Essex

- Middleton, Essex

Hampshire

- Middleton, Hampshire

Herefordshire

- Middleton, Herefordshire

Isle of Wight

- Middleton, Isle of Wight

Lancashire

- Middleton, Greater Manchester
  - Middleton (UK Parliament constituency) 1885–1918
- Middleton, Lancashire

Norfolk

- Middleton, Norfolk
- Middleton Towers, a country house at Middleton, Norfolk
- Middleton Towers railway station, a former station at Middleton, Norfolk

Northamptonshire

- Middleton, Northamptonshire
- Middleton Cheney

Northumberland

- Middleton, Northumberland (near Belford)
- Middleton, Wallington Demesne (near Cambo)

Oxfordshire

- Middleton Stoney

Shropshire

- Middleton (near Chirbury)
- Middleton, Bitterley, near Ludlow
- Middleton, Oswestry
- Middleton Baggot
- Middleton Priors
- Middleton Scriven

Staffordshire

- Middleton Green

Suffolk

- Middleton, Suffolk

Sussex

- Middleton-on-Sea, West Sussex
  - Middleton (electoral division), a West Sussex County Council constituency

Warwickshire

- Middleton, Warwickshire

Yorkshire

- Middleton, Craven
- Middleton, Harrogate
- Middleton, Leeds
- Middleton, Ryedale
- Middleton-on-Leven
- Middleton on the Wolds
- Middleton Quernhow
- Middleton Tyas

==== Scotland ====
- Middleton, Angus, a U.K. location
- Middleton, Argyll and Bute, a U.K. location
- Middleton, Midlothian, a U.K. location

==== Wales ====
- National Botanic Garden of Wales, also known as Middleton.
- Middleton, Swansea, a small village on the Gower peninsula

=== United States ===
- Middleton, former name of Middletown, California
- Middleton, Colorado
- Middleton, Idaho
- Middleton, Kentucky
- Middleton, Massachusetts
- Middleton, Michigan
- Middleton, Mississippi
- Middleton, New Hampshire
- Middleton, New York (part of Long Island City in Newton Township, Queens)
- Middleton, Oregon
- Middleton, Tennessee
- Middleton, Wisconsin, a city
  - Middleton (town), Wisconsin, a town
  - Middleton Junction, Wisconsin, an unincorporated community
  - West Middleton, Wisconsin, an unincorporated community
- Middleton Place, historic plantation in Dorchester County, South Carolina
- Middleton Tract, California
- Middleton, Utah, former town in Utah
- Middleton Township (disambiguation)

=== Fictional places ===
- Middleton, a setting in the DC Comics Martian Manhunter comic book series
- Middleton, the hometown of Kim Possible
- Middleton, the hometown of Buster Landru "Rant" Casey in Chuck Palahniuk's novel Rant
- Middleton, a setting in the Hallmark Channel series Good Witch

== Other uses ==
- Middleton (horse), a racehorse
- HMS Middleton, name of a Royal Navy destroyer and a minesweeper
- HMT Lord Middleton (FY219), a Second World War Royal Navy trawler
- RFA Robert Middleton (A241), a Dundas class coastal stores carrier of the Royal Fleet Auxiliary
- Middleton Railway, West Yorkshire
- At Middleton, 2013 romance film directed by Adam Rodgers
- Clan Middleton, Scottish clan

== See also ==
- Myddleton
- Myddelton
- Middleton Hall (disambiguation)
- Middletown (disambiguation)
- North Middleton (disambiguation)
- South Middleton (disambiguation)
- West Middleton, Indiana
- The Middletons, a comic strip
