= Splendora High School =

Public school in Texas, United States

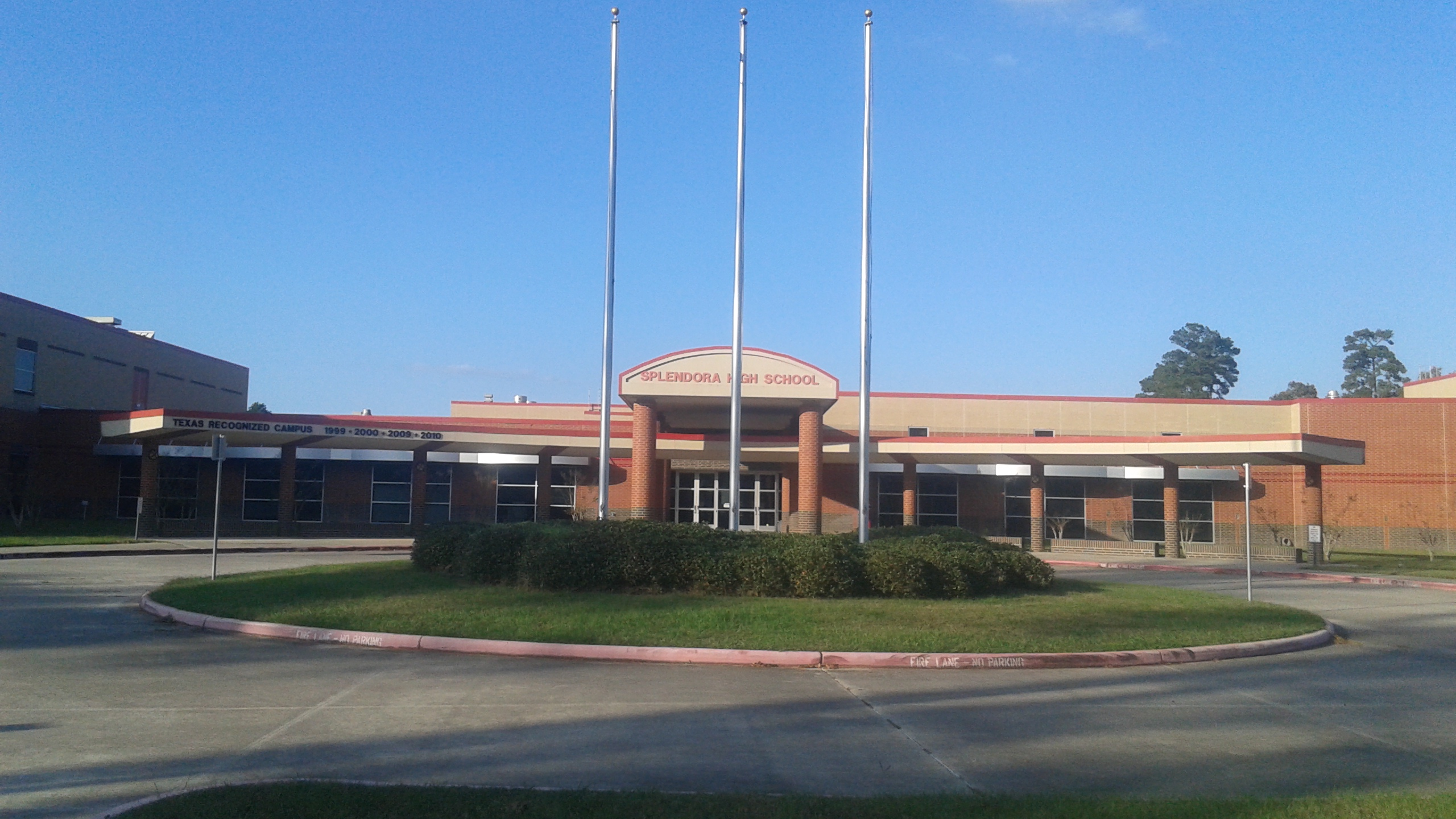

Location
- 23747 FM 2090; Splendora, Texas 77372; United States; 30.2477°N 95.1977°W

Information
- School type: Public high school
- Motto: Cultivating Exceptional People
- School district: Splendora Independent School District
- CEEB code: 446680
- NCES School ID: 484107004669
- Principal: Dianna Archer
- Faculty: 98.00 (on an FTE basis)
- Grades: 9 to 12
- Enrollment: 1,504 (2023—2024)
- Student to teacher ratio: 15.35
- Campus type: Rural
- Colors: Red; White; Gray
- Athletics conference: UIL Class 4A
- Mascot: Wildcat
- Website: Splendora High School

Splendora High School is a public high school in unincorporated Montgomery County, Texas, United States. It is the only high school within the Splendora Independent School District. The school's attendance zone includes the cities of Splendora and Patton Village. For the 2018–2019 academic year, the school received a C grade from the Texas Education Agency.

It is the sole comprehensive high school in its district, which includes Splendora, Patton Village, and sections of Cleveland and Deerwood.

== Demographics ==
In the 2018–2019 school year, there were 1,206 students enrolled at Splendora High School, including 374 students in 9th grade, 300 in 10th grade, 266 in 11th grade, and 266 in 12th grade. The ethnic distribution of students was as follows:

- 0.4% African American
- 39.5% Hispanic
- 58.3% White
- 0.3% Asian
- 0.2% American Indian
- 1.3% Two or More Races

56.3% of students were eligible for free or reduced-cost lunch. The school received Title I funding.

== Academics ==
For each academic year, the Texas Education Agency rates school performance using an A–F grading system based on statistical data. For the 2018–2019 academic year, the school received a score of 78 out of 100 resulting in a C grade. The school received a similar score of 81 the previous year.

Splendora High School students may enroll in the Splendora Early College High School program, in which students attend college courses at Lone Star College–Kingwood in addition to their coursework at Splendora High School. Students who complete the program will earn an associate degree. College credit may also be applied for up to two years of a bachelor's degree.

== Athletics ==
In 2016–2017, Splendora High School was moved to class 5A after competing in class 4A for two years and class 3A in previous years. The rapid rise in classification convinced the district to invest $4.5 million in facility upgrades to accommodate larger schools and game attendance. The school moved back to class 4A for 2018–2019.

== Notable alumni ==
- Brian Robison, NFL player
