= Charles Middleton =

Charles Middleton may refer to:

- Charles Middleton, 2nd Earl of Middleton (1649/50–1719), Scottish and English politician
- Charles Middleton, 1st Baron Barham (1726–1813), British aristocrat, First Lord of the Admiralty
- Charles Middleton (cricketer) (1868–1938), English cricketer
- Charles Middleton (actor) (1874–1949), known for his portrayal of Ming the Merciless
- Charlie Middleton (footballer) (1910–1984), English footballer
- Charles R. Middleton (born 1944), president of Roosevelt University from 2002 to 2015
- Charles G. Middleton (born 1953), chief of the Savannah Fire Department until 2018
