= David Middleton =

David Middleton may refer to:

- David Middleton (mariner) (died 1617), early English merchant of the East India Company
- David Middleton (cricketer) (born 1965), English cricketer
- Dave Middleton (1933–2007), American football wide receiver
- David Middleton Greig (1864–1936), Scottish surgeon
- David Stephen Middleton (born 1961), suspected serial killer known as The Cable Guy
- David Middleton (civil servant), New Zealand chief executive of the Earthquake Commission (1993–2010)
