= Kate Middleton (disambiguation) =

Kate Middleton (Catherine Elizabeth; born 1982) is Princess of Wales by marriage to Prince William of the United Kingdom.

Kate Middleton may also refer to:

- Kate Middleton, a character in The Middletons
- Kate Middleton (free-diver) (born 1987), New Zealand diver
- Kate Middleton (journalist), an alternative name for Australian journalist Karen Middleton

== See also ==
- Karen Middleton (disambiguation)
- Middleton (disambiguation)
