= Marine One (disambiguation) =

Marine One is the call sign for any U.S. Marine Corps aircraft carrying the President of the United States.

Marine One may also refer to:

- Marine One (fireboat), a fireboat operated by the Seattle Fire Department
- Marine 1 (Savannah fireboat), a fireboat operated by the Savannah, Georgia Fire Department, from 2014 to 1018
- "Marine One" (Homeland), an episode of the Homeland TV series

== See also ==
- Marina One, a mixed-use development in Marina South, Singapore
- Transportation of the president of the United States, where a military flight uses the call sign of the name of the armed service followed by the word "One"
