= John Middleton =

John Middleton may refer to:

== In the arts ==
- John Middleton (actor) (born 1953), English actor
- John Middleton (artist), Northern Irish artist, see The Honest Ulsterman
- John Middleton (Norfolk artist) (1827–1856), English artist
- John Powers Middleton (born 1984), American film and television producer
- John Izard Middleton (1785–1849), American archeologist and artist

== Politicians ==
- John Middleton (c.1373–1441), MP for Northumberland
- John Middleton (MP for City of London), represented City of London (Parliament of England constituency)
- John Middleton (MP for Horsham) (died 1636), English landowner and politician
- John Middleton (1671–1745), Member for Bramber and Horsham
- John Middleton (British Army officer) (1678–1739), Brigadier-General, Member for Aberdeen
- John Myddelton (1685–1747), MP for Denbigh Boroughs 1733–1741 and Denbighshire 1741–1742
- Sir John Middleton (colonial administrator) (1870–1954), British colonial administrator

== Scientists ==
- John Francis Marchment Middleton (1921–2009), British anthropologist
- John Henry Middleton (1846–1896), British archaeologist and museum director
- John Izard Middleton (1785–1849), American archeologist and artist

== Sportsmen ==
- John Middleton (baseball) (1900–1986), American baseball player
- John Middleton (cyclist) (1906–1991), British racing cyclist
- John Middleton (footballer, born 1910) (1910–1971), English football player for Swansea Town, Darlington, Blackpool and Norwich City
- John Middleton (footballer, born 1955) (1955–2026), English football player for Bradford City and Macclesfield
- John Middleton (footballer, born 1956) (1956–2016), English football player for Nottingham Forest and Derby County
- John Middleton (cricketer) (1890–1966), English cricketer
- John R. Middleton, American football player and coach
- John Middleton (rugby union) (1894–1974), English international rugby union player

== Other people ==
- John Middleton (architect) (1820–1885), English architect
- John Middleton (businessman) (born 1955), American businessman and philanthropist
- John Middleton (cowboy) (1854–1885), member of the Regulators alongside Billy the Kid during the Lincoln County War
- John Middleton (explorer), travelled to the East Indies with James Lancaster, 1601–1603
- John Middleton (giant) (1578–1623), 2.8m tall man from Hale, England
- John Middleton (judge), Australian judge, of the Federal Court of Australia from 2006 to 2022
- John Middleton, 1st Earl of Middleton (c.1608–1674), general in the Battle of Cropredy Bridge during the English Civil War

== Fictional characters ==
- John Middleton, a fictional character in American TV series Virgin River

== Other uses ==
- John Middleton Co., a tobacco manufacturer and subsidiary of Altria
