= James Middleton (disambiguation) =

James Middleton (born 1987) is a British businessman and brother of Catherine, Princess of Wales.

James, Jim or Jimmy Middleton may also refer to:

== Sports ==
- Bonnor Middleton (James Middleton, 1865–1913), South African cricketer
- Jim Middleton (baseball) (1889–1974), American baseball player
- Jimmy Middleton (footballer) (1922–1997), Scottish footballer
- Jim Middleton (footballer) (fl. 1960), New Zealand footballer
- Khris Middleton (James Khristian Middleton, born 1991), American basketball player

== Others ==
- James Middleton (actor) (1769–1799), Irish actor
- James Taylor Middleton (1840–1926), Ontario businessman and political figure
- James Middleton (political organiser) (1878–1962), General Secretary of the British Labour Party
- Jim Middleton (journalist), Australian television journalist
