= Arthur Middleton (disambiguation) =

Arthur Middleton (1742–1787) was an American Revolutionary War figure.

Arthur Middleton may also refer to:

- Arthur Middleton (1681–1737), acting governor of South Carolina
- Arthur Middleton (bass-baritone) (1880–1929), American opera singer
- Arthur Middleton (footballer) (1876–1945), Australian rules footballer
- Arthur Edward Middleton (1891–1953), British politician
- USS Arthur Middleton, the lead ship of the Arthur Middleton-class attack transports
