= Caney Creek High School =

Coordinates: 30.2549°N 95.3132°W

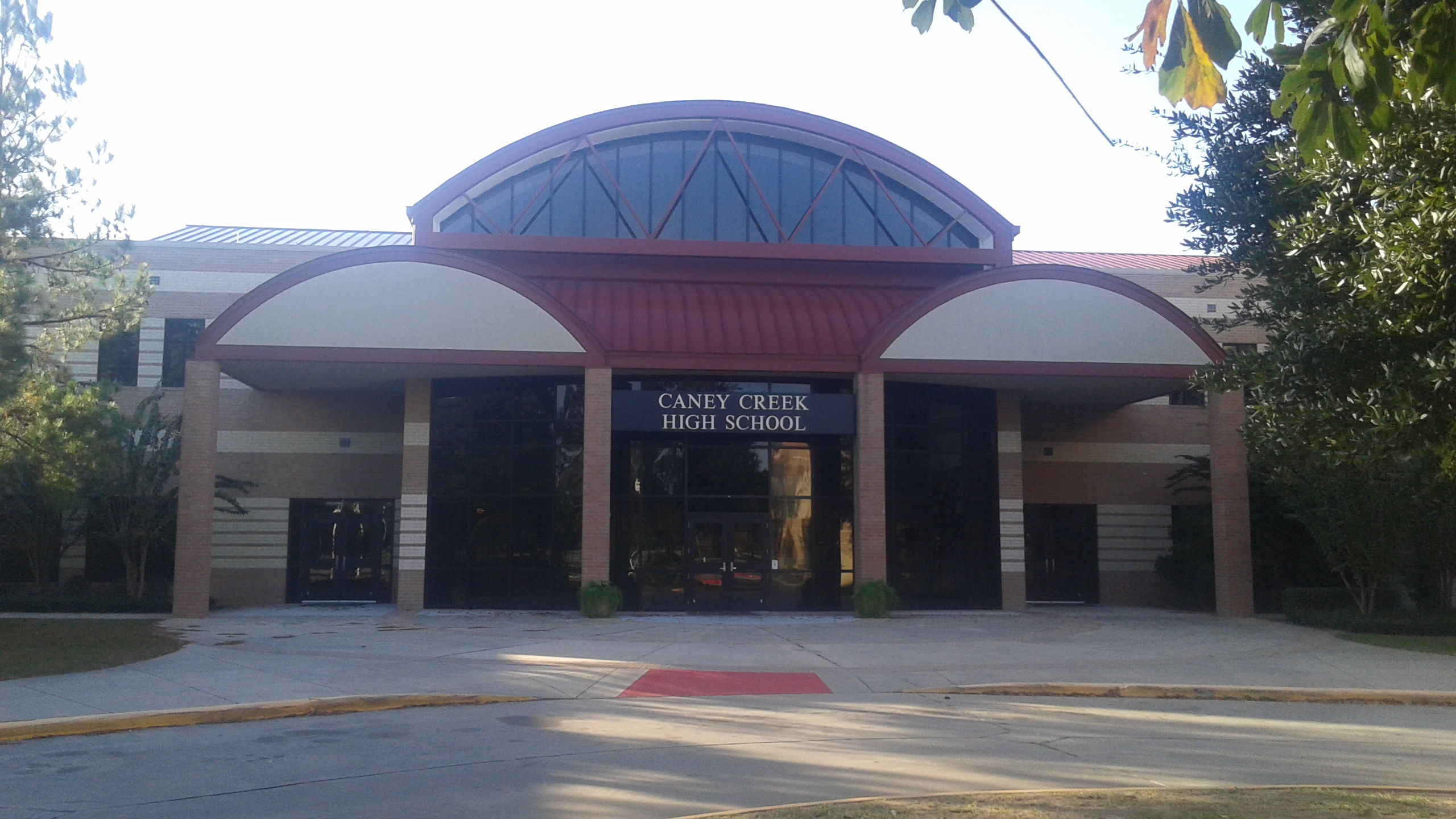

Location
- 13470 FM 1485; Conroe, Texas 77306; United States

Information
- School type: Public high school
- Established: 1996
- School district: Conroe Independent School District
- Principal: Dr. Jeffrey Stichler
- Faculty: 167.09 (on an FTE basis)
- Grades: 9–12
- Enrollment: 2,620 (2023-2024)
- Student to teacher ratio: 15.68
- Campus: Suburban
- Colors: Scarlet & Vegas Gold
- Athletics conference: UIL Class AAAAAA
- Mascot: Panther
- Yearbook: The Creek
- Website: cchs.conroeisd.net

Caney Creek High School is a high school in Montgomery County, Texas, near Conroe. It is part of the Conroe Independent School District. Caney Creek serves several areas in Montgomery County, including the city of Cut and Shoot, the census-designated place (CDP) of Grangerland, a portion of the Porter Heights CDP, and a portion of the Deerwood CDP. In 2018–2019, the school received a C grade from the Texas Education Agency.

The school was established in 1996, located on the east side of the same building as Moorhead Junior High School. In 2008 Moorhead Junior High moved into a new building, and Caney Creek High School's 9th graders occupied where MJHS originally was.

== Demographics ==
In the 2021–2022 school year, there were 2,271 students enrolled at Caney Creek High School. The ethnic distribution of students was as follows:

- 0.6% American Indian/Alaska Native
- 0.2% Asian
- 2.0% Black
- 64.0% Hispanic
- 32.2% White
- 1.1% Two or More Races

72.5% of students were eligible for free or reduced-cost lunch. The school received Title I funding.

== Academics ==
For each school year, the Texas Education Agency rates school performance using an A–F grading system based on statistical data. For 2018–2019, the school received a score of 79 out of 100, resulting in a C grade. The school received a score of 75 the previous year.

== Feeder schools ==
Elementary schools (PreK–4) that feed Caney Creek High School include:

- Austin
- Creighton
- Hope
- Milam
- San Jacinto

Campbell Elementary (PreK-6), Grangerland Intermediate (5–6), Veterans Memorial Intermediate (5-6) and Moorhead Junior High (7–8) also feed Caney Creek High School.

== Athletics ==
The Caney Creek Panthers compete in the following sports:

- Baseball
- Basketball
- Cross country
- Football
- Golf
- Soccer
- Softball
- Tennis
- Track and field
- Volleyball
- Wrestling

== Controversy ==
In September 2006, a parent requested that Caney Creek High School remove Ray Bradbury's Fahrenheit 451 from the curriculum, citing language and religious concerns; this request occurred during the American Library Association's "Banned Books Week".
