= Robert Middleton (disambiguation) =

Robert Middleton (1911–1977) was an American film and television actor.

Robert Middleton or variants may also refer to:

== People ==
- Robert Myddelton (born by 1526) (died 1567), MP for Denbigh Boroughs, 1547
- Robert Myddelton (died 1616) (c. 1563–1616) MP for Weymouth and Melcombe Regis, 1604, City of London, 1614
- Robert Myddelton (1678–1733), MP for Denbigh Boroughs, 1722–23
- Robert Middleton of Caldhame, father of John Middleton, 1st Earl of Middleton
- Robert Middleton (priest), executed 1601 at Lancaster
- Robert Gambier Middleton (1774-1837) Royal Navy Officer
- Robert Tweedie Middleton (1831–1891), Scottish Liberal politician
- R. Hunter Middleton (1898–1985), American book designer, painter, and type designer
- Robert Middleton (footballer) (1903–?), Scottish international footballer
- Bob Middleton (American football) (1941–2010), American football player and coach
- Bob Middleton (bowls), Australian lawn bowler
- Robbie Middleton (1990–2011), American boy murdered in Texas, see murder of Robbie Middleton

== Other uses ==
- RFA Robert Middleton, a 1938 Dundas class coastal stores carrier of the Royal Fleet Auxiliary
