= Myddleton =

Myddleton is a surname. Notable people with the surname include:

- George Frederick Myddleton Cornwallis-West (1874–1951), British officer of the Scots Guards
- Hugh Myddleton, 1st Baronet (1560–1631), Welsh goldsmith, clothmaker, banker, entrepreneur, mine-owner and self-taught engineer
- Ririd Myddleton, MVO DL JP (1902–1988), country gentleman and one-time member of the Royal Household
- William H. Myddleton or Arnold Safroni-Middleton (born 1873), British composer, director, violinist, harpist, writer and amateur astronomer

== See also ==
- Middlestone
- Middleton (disambiguation)
- Midleton
- Myddelton
