= South Middleton =

South Middleton can refer to:

- South Middleton, Greater Manchester, a ward of Rochdale Borough Council, England
- South Middleton, Ilderton, a location in Northumberland, England
- South Middleton, Wallington Demesne, a former civil parish, now in Wallington Demesne, Northumberland, England
- South Middleton, Ontario, Canada
- South Middleton Township, Pennsylvania, USA

== See also ==
- Middleton (disambiguation)
- North Middleton (disambiguation)
- West Middleton
