= Charles G. Middleton =

American former firefighter (born 1953)

- Born: 1953 (age 72–73); Savannah, Georgia
- Occupation: firefighter
- Known for: Brought reforms to the Savannah Fire Department

Charles Middleton is a former firefighter and fire officer. He served as a firefighter for 42 years, and the last 12 years as Chief of the Fire Department, in Savannah, Georgia, his home town.

== Education ==
Middleton attended Groves High School, graduating in 1970. He then served a hitch in the United States Navy.

Middleton earned a master's degree in public administration from George Mason University. He earned Chief Fire Officer certification in 2003.

== Career ==
Prior to serving as Chief, in Savannah, he worked in fire departments in Fort Myer, Virginia, Arlington County, Virginia and Orange County, Florida. Middleton started working as Chief, in Savannah, on July 6, 2006, after 12 years in Orange County, Florida, where he had been a Division Chief.

=== Certifications and standards ===
According to the Savannah Tribune, Middleton was a reformer, who oversaw reforms that raised the Savannah Fire Department to "one of the nation's highest ranking fire departments."

In 2014, Middleton played a role in the Insurance Services Organization (ISO) recognizing Savannah as one of the cities most prepared to respond to fires. ISO-1 certification is earned by less than half of one percent of American cities' Fire Departments.

In 2016, under Middleton's leadership, the Department was the first in the nation to earn certification, from the National Association of State Boating Law Administrators, for the skills and preparation of its firefighters in boat handling.

=== Marine One ===
Middleton played a key role in Savannah's acquisition of the Marine One, a $1.5 million, state-of-the-art, fireboat. Savannah acquired the vessel in 2014, with $1.2 million of its cost covered by a FEMA Port Security Grant. Shortly after Middleton announced his retirement city officials announced that budget cuts would require the fire station where the fireboat was moored to be closed.

== Retirement ==
He announced his retirement on October 31, 2018.Canada
