= Karen Middleton =

Karen Middleton may refer to:

- Karen Middleton (basketball), American basketball coach
- Karen Middleton (journalist), Australian journalist
- Karen Middleton (politician) (born 1966), American politician

== See also ==
- Kate Middleton (disambiguation)
  - Kate Middleton (born 1982), Princess of Wales by marriage to Prince William
- Middleton (disambiguation)
