= Harry Middleton =

Harry Middleton may refer to:

- Harry Middleton (footballer, born 1870) (1870-1949), English footballer see List of Manchester City F.C. players (25–99 appearances)
- Harry Middleton (footballer, born 1902) (1902-1941), English footballer see List of Oldham Athletic A.F.C. players (1–24 appearances)
- Harry J. Middleton (1921–2017), presidential speechwriter, journalist, writer, and library director
- Harry Middleton (nature writer) (1951–1993), southern American nature writer
- Harry Middleton (footballer, born 1937), English footballer
- Harry Middleton (footballer, born 1995), English footballer

== See also ==
- Henry Middleton (disambiguation)
- Harold Middleton, book series
