= Grangerland, Texas =

Coordinates: 30°15′10″N 95°19′46″W

Grangerland
- Unincorporated community Census designated place
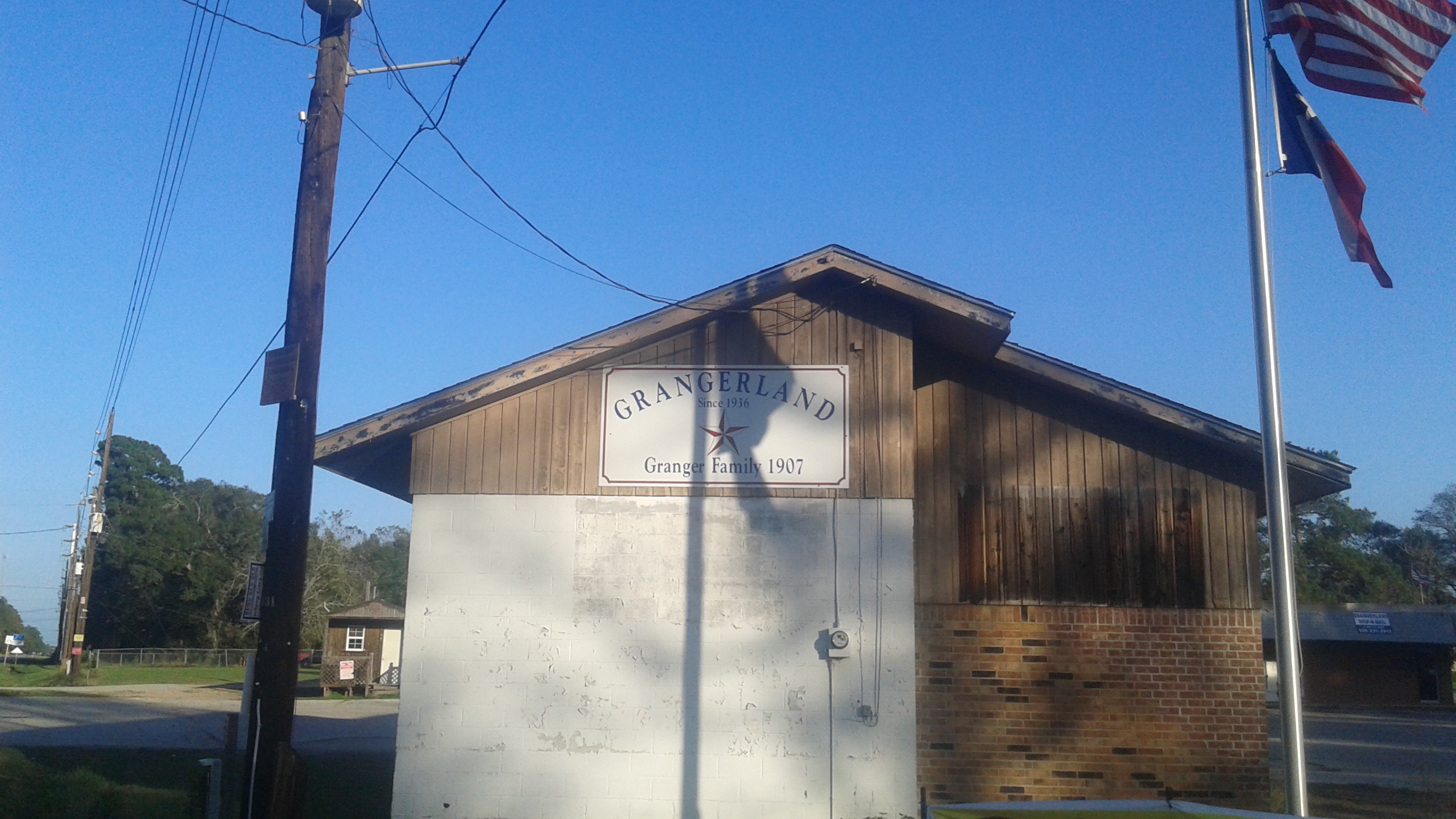
- Grangerland welcome sign
- Interactive map of Grangerland
- Country: United States
- State: Texas
- County: Montgomery
- Zip code: 77306, 77302

Grangerland is an unincorporated community and census designated place (CDP) in east central Montgomery County, Texas, United States. As of the 2020 census, Grangerland had a population of 754.

Grangerland is located at the intersection of F.M. 3083 and F.M. 2090, approximately 30 miles north of Houston and 10 miles southeast of Conroe.

== History ==
In 1907, Dr. Edwin Granger purchased land in what is now known as "Grangerland" with the intention of starting a community in the area. Dr. Granger and his fellow settlers made their living by farming cotton, selling limited lumber, and cutting railroad ties.

In 1931, during the Texas oil boom, oil was discovered in the area. To accommodate the influx of oil workers, Don D. Granger, Dr. Edwin Granger's son, built a group of houses called, "Granger's Camp." As the area continued to expand in the 1940s and 1950s, the area surrounding the camp became known as "Grangerland."

== Demographics ==
Historical population
Census	Pop.	Note	%±
2020	754		—
U.S. Decennial Census; 1850–1900 1910; 1920 1930 1940; 1950 1960 1970; 1980 1990 2000; 2010 2020

Grangerland first appeared as a census designated place in the 2020 U.S. census.

=== 2020 Census ===
Grangerland CDP, Texas – Racial and ethnic composition Note: the US Census treats Hispanic/Latino as an ethnic category. This table excludes Latinos from the racial categories and assigns them to a separate category. Hispanics/Latinos may be of any race.
Race / Ethnicity (NH = Non-Hispanic)	Pop 2020	% 2020
White alone (NH)	569	75.46%
Black or African American alone (NH)	0	0.00%
Native American or Alaska Native alone (NH)	2	0.27%
Asian alone (NH)	4	0.53%
Native Hawaiian or Pacific Islander alone (NH)	1	0.13%
Other race alone (NH)	4	0.53%
Mixed race or Multiracial (NH)	27	3.58%
Hispanic or Latino (any race)	147	19.50%
Total	754	100.00%

== Government ==
As an unincorporated community, local administrative responsibilities are managed by Montgomery County, Precinct 4. As of June 2023, the commissioner for Precinct 4 is Matt Gray. Caney Creek Fire and Rescue operates a fire station within the community.

In the Texas State Senate, Grangerland is in District 4, represented by Republican Brandon Creighton. In the Texas House of Representatives, Grangerland is in District 3, represented by Republican Cecil Bell, Jr.

In the United States Senate, the entire state of Texas is represented by Republicans John Cornyn and Ted Cruz. In the United States House of Representatives, Grangerland is in District 8, represented by Republican Morgan Luttrell.

== Education ==
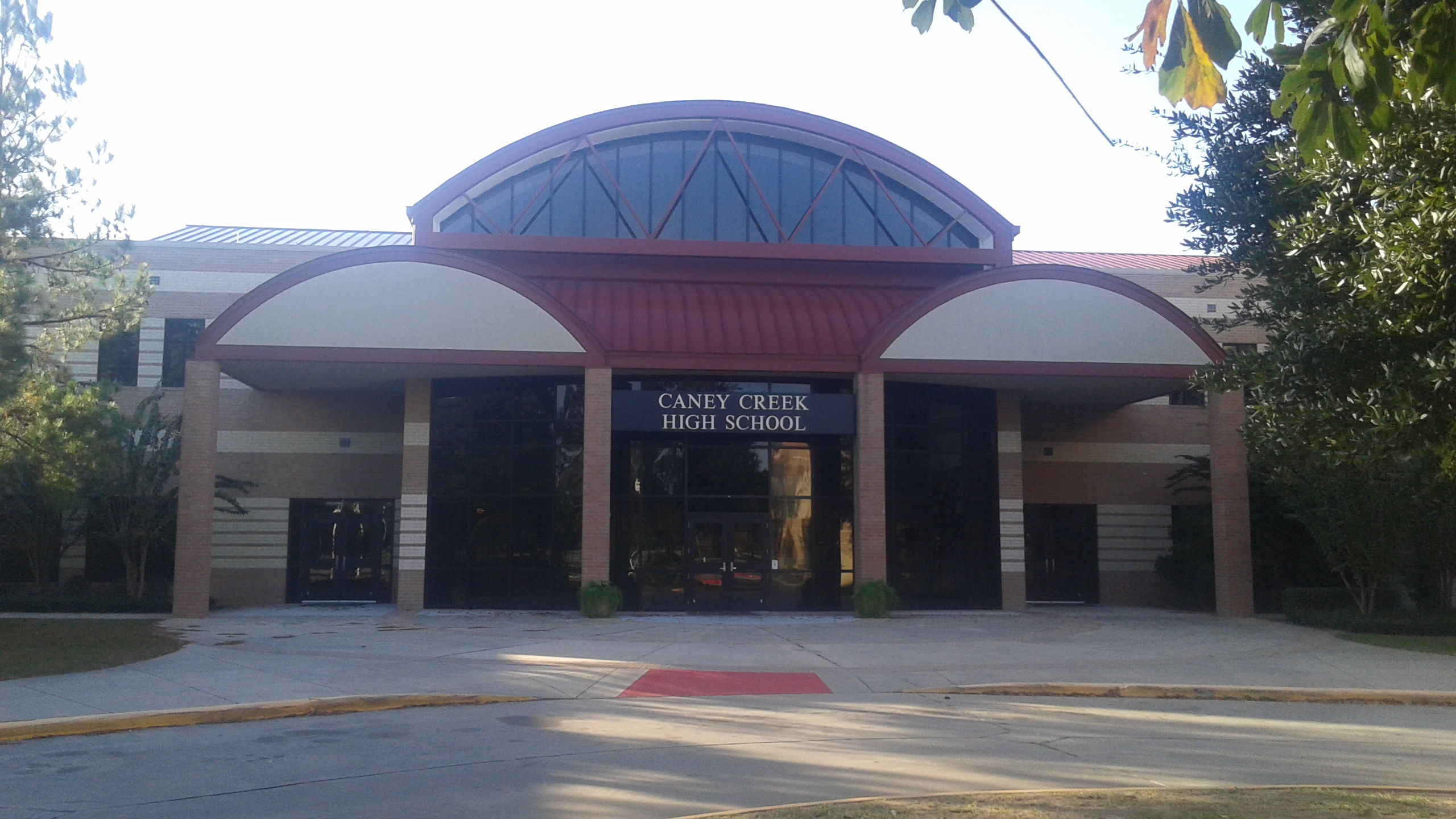
Caney Creek High School, Conroe ISD.

Grangerland students attend schools in the Conroe Independent School District.

- Elementary students (K-4) in south and west Grangerland attend Ben Milam Elementary School.
- Elementary students (K-4) in north and east Grangerland attend Creighton Elementary School.
- Intermediate students (5-6) attend Grangerland Intermediate School.
- Junior High students (7-8) attend Moorhead Junior High School.
- High School students (9-12) attend Caney Creek High School.

Residents of Conroe ISD (and therefore Grangerland) are served by the Lone Star College System (formerly North Harris Montgomery Community College).
