= North Middleton =

North Middleton may refer to:

- North Middleton, Greater Manchester, a ward of Rochdale Borough Council, England
- North Middleton, Midlothian, Scotland
- North Middleton, Ilderton, a location in Northumberland, England
- North Middleton, Wallington Demesne, a former civil parish, now in Wallington Demesne, Northumberland, England
- North Middleton Township, Pennsylvania, United States

== See also ==
- Middleton (disambiguation)
- South Middleton (disambiguation)
- West Middleton
