= William Middleton =

William Middleton may refer to:

== Politicians ==
- William Middleton (by 1533 – 1574 or later), MP for Carlisle
- Sir William Middleton, 3rd Baronet, British member of parliament for Northumberland, 1722–1757
- Sir William Middleton, 5th Baronet, British member of parliament for Northumberland, 1774–1795
- Sir William Fowle Middleton, 1st Baronet (1748–1829), British member of parliament for Ipswich, and for Hastings

== Others ==
- William Middleton (bishop) (died 1288), medieval bishop of Norwich
- Wiliam Midleton (c. 1550–1596), Welsh poet and adventurer
- William Middleton (pamphleteer) (died 1613), English churchman, academic and Protestant controversialist
- Bay Middleton (William George Middleton, 1846–1892), equerry to John Spencer, 5th Earl Spencer
- William Shainline Middleton (1890–1975), American internist
- William James Middleton (1897–1918), World War I flying ace
- William D. Middleton (1928–2011), author, reporter and photographer
- William Middleton (American football) (born 1986), American football cornerback
- William Middleton (writer), journalist and writer
- Billy Middleton (1893–?), English football forward
- Bill Middleton (1920–1951), Australian rugby league player
