= David Stephen Middleton =

American murderer and suspected serial killer

- Middleton's mugshot
- Born: June 25, 1961 (age 65); Boston, Massachusetts, U.S.
- Other name: "The Cable Guy"
- Convictions: First degree murder (2 counts); First degree kidnapping (2 counts); Ex-felon in possession of a firearm (2 counts); Grand larceny Fraudulent use of a credit card False imprisonment Battery
- Penalty: Nevada; Death; Florida; 5 years imprisonment

Details
- Victims: 2–3+
- Span of crimes: 1994 – 1995 (possibly 1993)
- Country: United States
- States: Nevada, possibly Colorado
- Date apprehended: February 23, 1995
- Imprisoned at: High Desert State Prison, Clark County, Nevada

David Stephen Middleton (born June 25, 1961), known as The Cable Guy, is an American former police officer, kidnapper, murderer, and suspected serial killer. Convicted and sentenced to death for the murders of two women in Nevada committed in 1994 and 1995, he is also the prime suspect in at least one additional murder in Colorado and rapes committed while serving in the Miami-Dade Police Department.

== Early life ==
David Stephen Middleton was born on June 25, 1961, in Boston, Massachusetts, the only son of a police officer. Little is known about his upbringing, but at some point during his life, Middleton moved to Miami, Florida, where he studied at a police academy and later applied for a job at the Miami-Dade Police Department. He was accepted sometime in 1981 and served as an officer in the Miami-Dade County area.

=== Employment at Miami-Dade PD ===
During his tenure at the Miami Police Department, Middleton used his position to pick up and rape vulnerable young women. Among his victims was 16-year-old AC, whom he picked up off a street in Miami in September 1990 using the excuse that it was past her curfew and her parents were worried. After handcuffing her and lying that he would take her to the nearest juvenile correctional institution, Middleton instead drove to an area outside of town, where he proceeded to rape AC. After the assault, he dropped her off in an empty lot, warning her not to tell anybody about what had happened.

AC ignored his warnings and immediately informed the authorities, who detained and charged him with rape. At the trial, however, the jury was deadlocked on the rape charge. As a result, Middleton was instead convicted of false imprisonment and was allowed to plead guilty on the lesser charge of the battery, for which he was given a 5-year sentence at a local penitentiary. Middleton was paroled two years later and moved out of Florida, settling first in Colorado and then Nevada, where he found work as a cable TV repairman.

== Murders ==
=== Buffy Rice Donohue (suspected) ===
On November 21, 1993, 18-year-old Buffy Rice Donohue left her parents' house in Montrose, Colorado to wash her car and later buy some lemonade, but she never returned to the house or her husband. As a result, Donohue's father and husband went searching for her and eventually found her car parked at the parking lot of a local Walmart. Inside, they found her wallet and driver's license, but Donohue herself was nowhere to be seen.

The circumstances of her disappearance led some to believe that it might have been related to the disappearance of 14-year-old Cindy Booth, who was reported missing from her home in Delta after going out with her bike to meet a friend. Investigators disputed this theory from the CBI, who claimed that there were too many differences between the two cases for them to be related. As the searches continued, investigators established that Donohue was last seen at a Safeway store in Montrose, but due to the passage of time, it was assumed that she might have met with foul play.

Eventually, both of Donohue's parents were charged with felony menacing, false imprisonment and criminal trespassing about unrelated incidents committed during attempts to locate their daughter. In response to the charges, Frank Marquis, an inmate who was facing murder charges in an unrelated case, organized a hunger strike to show his solidarity with the family.

=== Thelma Davila ===
On August 8, 1994, 42-year-old Thelma Amparo Davila, a Guatemalan porter employed at the Circus Circus casino in Reno, was reported missing by her younger sister after she failed to return home from work. This was considered highly concerning, as she had never skipped work since she was hired in 1988 and did not have a means of transportation as she could not drive. Her fate remained unclear until April 1995, when her remains were found in Verdi.

=== Katherine Powell ===
On February 6, 1995, 45-year-old Katherine Powell, a respected teacher working at the Sun Valley Elementary School in Reno, was reported missing by her colleagues after failing to show up to work for two days in a row. Officers were then dispatched to search her home, and upon entering, they found that her truck had been left untouched, but Powell herself was nowhere to be seen, and some of her items were missing. Upon questioning the neighbors, the officers learned that an old, beat-up car driven by an unfamiliar man frequently stopped by the residence but could not provide more information.

On February 11, Powell's body was found in a trash bin at the Lakegrove Condominiums, wrapped in a sleeping bag. Although it showed no visible signs of violence, the circumstances of the discovery indicated that she was the victim of a homicide, with acquaintances theorizing that someone had taken advantage of her kind-hearted nature and killed her. Further investigations revealed that a friend of Powell's had seen her shopping at a Target store in Sparks on the night she was reported missing. The news of her death shocked the local community, who mourned her loss and feared for the safety of the children.

== Investigation and arrest ==
While investigating potential suspects in the Powell case, one of the detectives took notice of Middleton, as he had done a TV installation at her home and owned a truck similar to the one supposedly seen by the neighbors. As a result, officers went to search his apartment on February 23, where they found a shotgun. As he was an ex-felon and thus prohibited from possessing firearms, they tracked down and arrested Middleton, lodging him in the Washoe County Jail on $3,500 bail. His girlfriend, 37-year-old Evonne Ione Haley, was also arrested on charges of using drugs but was later released.

Upon a closer examination of his criminal record, investigators learned of Middleton's convictions back in Miami and that his purchases for electronic equipment coincided with those ordered by Powell. They eventually gathered enough evidence to charge him with the murders of both Powell and Davila, after which he was charged with two counts of capital murder. In response to this, his public defender, Mike Specchio, filed a motion to have a gag order issued on the press to prevent them from covering this case, ostensibly because his client did not consent to it.

== Trial ==
At a preliminary hearing, many aspects of the case were scrutinized, including speculation from both sides that Middleton might have stored Powell's body in his refrigerator, which stemmed from the fact that two holes had been drilled and the shelves had been inexplicably removed. In addition to this, prosecutors presented purchases from a Good Guys store in Reno with Powell's credit card and bite mark evidence that supposedly indicated that Middleton had bitten one of Powell's breasts while raping her. Two days after this hearing, a judge ruled that Middleton could be tried for the two murders as he considered there was sufficient evidence to charge him with murder.

Parallel to Middleton's trial, his girlfriend's trial for credit card fraud, possession of stolen property, and burglary was also kept under watch from prosecutors, as some pieces of evidence overlapped in both trials. In addition, if Haley were convicted, she would be able to appear as a witness and testify against Middleton, who had pleaded innocent and claimed that while he had had sex with Powell, it was consensual and that he had left her house, only to return and find her dead. Middleton claimed that he feared he would be blamed for her murder. Due to this, he decided to wrap her body up in the sleeping bag and throw it in the trash bin. Middleton then appealed his case to the district court, which ruled that the murder charges should be thrown out because the cause of death of either victim could not be determined. This ruling was immediately appealed to the Supreme Court of Nevada, which reinstated the murder charges.

In February 1998, Florida authorities filed proceedings for some of the rapes Middleton committed in their state: one of the charges was for the rape of Cosme, and the other for the rape of a Jane Doe on multiple occasions. In the latter case, the filings alleged that Middleton had engaged in involuntary sexual acts with the victim during a DUI check and later during a visit to his house, in which Middleton was dressed in priest garb and conducted Voodoo-like rituals before raping the victim. Unlike the Cosme case, he was initially not charged with any crime related to the assaults on the unnamed victim.

Eventually, when Haley was convicted of her respective charges, she was brought forward as a witness for the prosecution but refused to answer any questions, invoking her Fifth Amendment rights. As the trial was drawing to a close, prosecutors brought in forensics experts from the FBI to demonstrate how wool fibers collected from Powell's body matched those found inside the refrigerator owned by Middleton.

=== Conviction and death sentence ===
In September 1997, Middleton was found guilty on all counts by the jury, a verdict that was cheered on and welcomed by both prosecutors and the victims' family members. Shortly after the trial, several of said family members told in interviews with the press that they wished he would receive the death penalty for his crimes. Middleton himself appeared concerned upon hearing the verdict, but otherwise did not react.

A few days later, Middleton was officially sentenced to death for the murders of Davila and Powell and given four life terms without parole for their kidnappings. The announcement was met with relief from the victims' family members, including the family of Buffy Donohue, who said that they would like to attend his execution if it is ever carried out. A month later, he was given an additional 32 years for credit card and firearms offences he had committed in connection with the cases. In 1999, the Donohue family hired a special prosecutor in an attempt to charge Middleton with their daughter's murder, but no such charges were brought forward.

As of February 2024, Middleton remains on Nevada's death row and awaits execution.

== See also ==
- Capital punishment in Nevada
- List of death row inmates in the United States § Nevada
- List of homicides in Nevada

== Bibliography ==
- Jeff Kaye (January 5, 2009). Beware of the Cable Guy: From Cop to Serial Killer. Polimedia Publishing. ISBN 978-0976861737.
