= Deerwood, Texas =

- Census-designated place
- Location within Texas Location within the United States
- Coordinates: 30°18′56″N 95°18′3″W
- Country: United States
- State: Texas
- County: Montgomery

Area
  - Total: 0.57 sq mi (1.48 km^{2})
  - Land: 0.57 sq mi (1.48 km^{2})
  - Water: 0 sq mi (0.0 km^{2})
- Elevation: 188 ft (57 m)

Population (2020)
  - Total: 1,745
- Time zone: UTC-6 (Central (CST))
  - Summer (DST): UTC-5 (CDT)
- ZIP Code: 77306 (Conroe)
- Area code: 936
- FIPS code: 48-19632
- GNIS feature ID: 2805821

Deerwood is an unincorporated community and census-designated place (CDP) in Montgomery County, Texas, United States. It was first listed as a CDP prior to the 2020 census. As of the 2020 census, Deerwood had a population of 1,745.

Deerwood is in the eastern part of the county, 10 miles (16 km) east of Conroe, the county seat, and 2 miles (3 km) southeast of Texas State Highway 105. It is within the southwestern corner of Sam Houston National Forest, and is bordered to the south by Conroe Division of the BNSF Railway.

== Demographics ==
Historical population
Census	Pop.	Note	%±
2020	1,745		—
U.S. Decennial Census; 1850–1900 1910; 1920 1930 1940; 1950 1960 1970; 1980 1990 2000; 2010 2020

Deerwood first appeared as a census designated place in the 2020 U.S. census.

=== 2020 Census ===
Deerwood CDP, Texas – Racial and ethnic composition Note: the US Census treats Hispanic/Latino as an ethnic category. This table excludes Latinos from the racial categories and assigns them to a separate category. Hispanics/Latinos may be of any race.
Race / Ethnicity (NH = Non-Hispanic)	Pop 2020	% 2020
White alone (NH)	74	4.24%
Black or African American alone (NH)	7	0.40%
Native American or Alaska Native alone (NH)	1	0.06%
Asian alone (NH)	3	0.17%
Native Hawaiian or Pacific Islander alone (NH)	0	0.00%
Other race alone (NH)	8	0.46%
Mixed race or Multiracial (NH)	14	0.80%
Hispanic or Latino (any race)	1,638	93.87%
Total	1,745	100.00%

== Education ==
Most of Deerwood is in the Conroe Independent School District, while a portion of Deerwood is in the Splendora Independent School District.

The portion in Conroe ISD is zoned to Creighton Elementary School. Veterans Memorial Intermediate School, Moorhead Junior High School, and Caney Creek High School.

Splendora High School is the sole comprehensive high school of Splendora ISD.

Residents of Conroe ISD and Splendora ISD are zoned to Lone Star College.
