= Brian Robison =

American football player (born 1983)

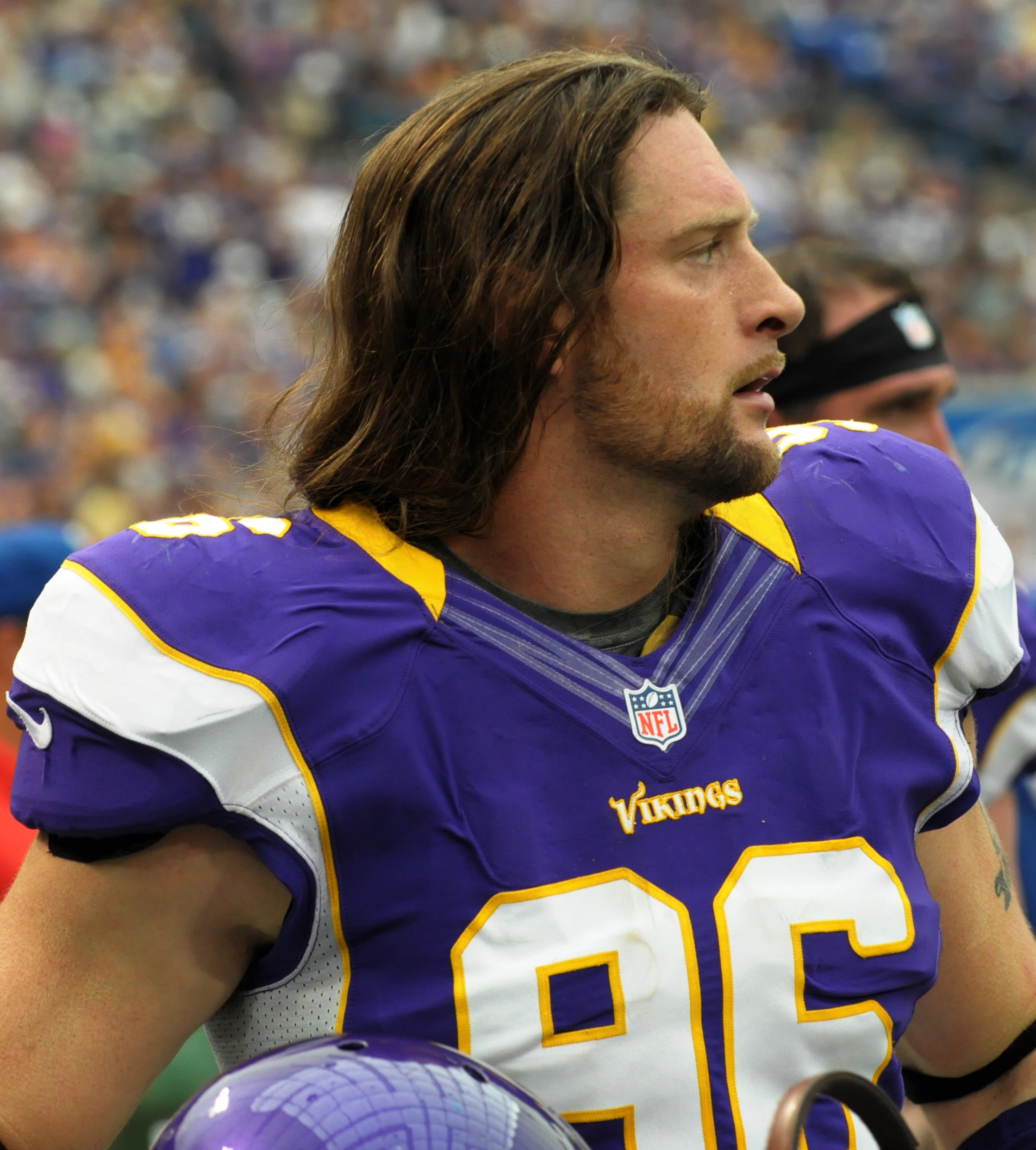
- Robison with the Minnesota Vikings in 2012

No. 96
- Position: Defensive end

Personal information
- Born: April 27, 1983 (age 43); Houston, Texas, U.S.
- Listed height: 6 ft 3 in (1.91 m)
- Listed weight: 259 lb (117 kg)

Career information
- High school: Splendora (Splendora, Texas)
- College: Texas (2002–2006)
- NFL draft: 2007: 4th round, 102nd overall pick

Career history
- Minnesota Vikings (2007–2017)

Awards and highlights
- PFWA All-Rookie Team (2007); BCS national champion (2005)

Career NFL statistics
- Total tackles: 289
- Sacks: 60.0
- Forced fumbles: 13
- Fumble recoveries: 8
- Pass deflections: 19
- Defensive touchdowns: 1
- Stats at Pro Football Reference

Brian Gale Robison (born April 27, 1983) is an American former professional football player who was a defensive end in the National Football League (NFL). He was selected by the Minnesota Vikings in the fourth round of the 2007 NFL draft and played for the team for 11 seasons. In 173 NFL games, he recorded 289 tackles, 60 sacks and one touchdown. He played college football for the Texas Longhorns. While at college, he also participated in track and field, competing in the shot put; in 2006, his senior year, he finished in second place in the shot put competition at the NCAA Outdoor Championships.

== Early life ==
Robison attended Splendora High School in Splendora, Texas, where he earned All-State honors in both football and track and field. He was a four-year starter at defensive tackle (freshman) and linebacker (final three years). He registered 66 tackles for loss and 28 sacks in his final three seasons. As a senior, he earned second-team All-State Class 3A and first-team All-District honors, registering 98 tackles, 20 stops behind the line of scrimmage, eight sacks and four pass deflections. He was an honorable mention All-State and first-team All-District selection as a junior after he posted 121 tackles, 14 stops for loss, eight sacks and seven pass break-ups for a defense that allowed only 101 points in 2000. As a sophomore, he had 125 tackles, 32 stops behind the line of scrimmage, 12 sacks, 12 pass deflections and an interception. In addition, he spent some time at running back, averaging 11 yards per carry and scoring three times, and tight end during his career.

Also a standout in track and field, Robison was one of the nation's top discus throwers and shot putters, winning both events at the district, regional and state meets as a senior. He still holds the Texas high school record in the discus throw at 65.61 meters (215 feet 3 inches). He also played basketball (forward) for four years and baseball (pitcher) for two years and was an honor roll student, being named a four-year Academic All-District selection, and was second-team Academic All-State as a senior. Robison had his number 40 jersey retired by Splendora High School in September 2004.

== College career ==
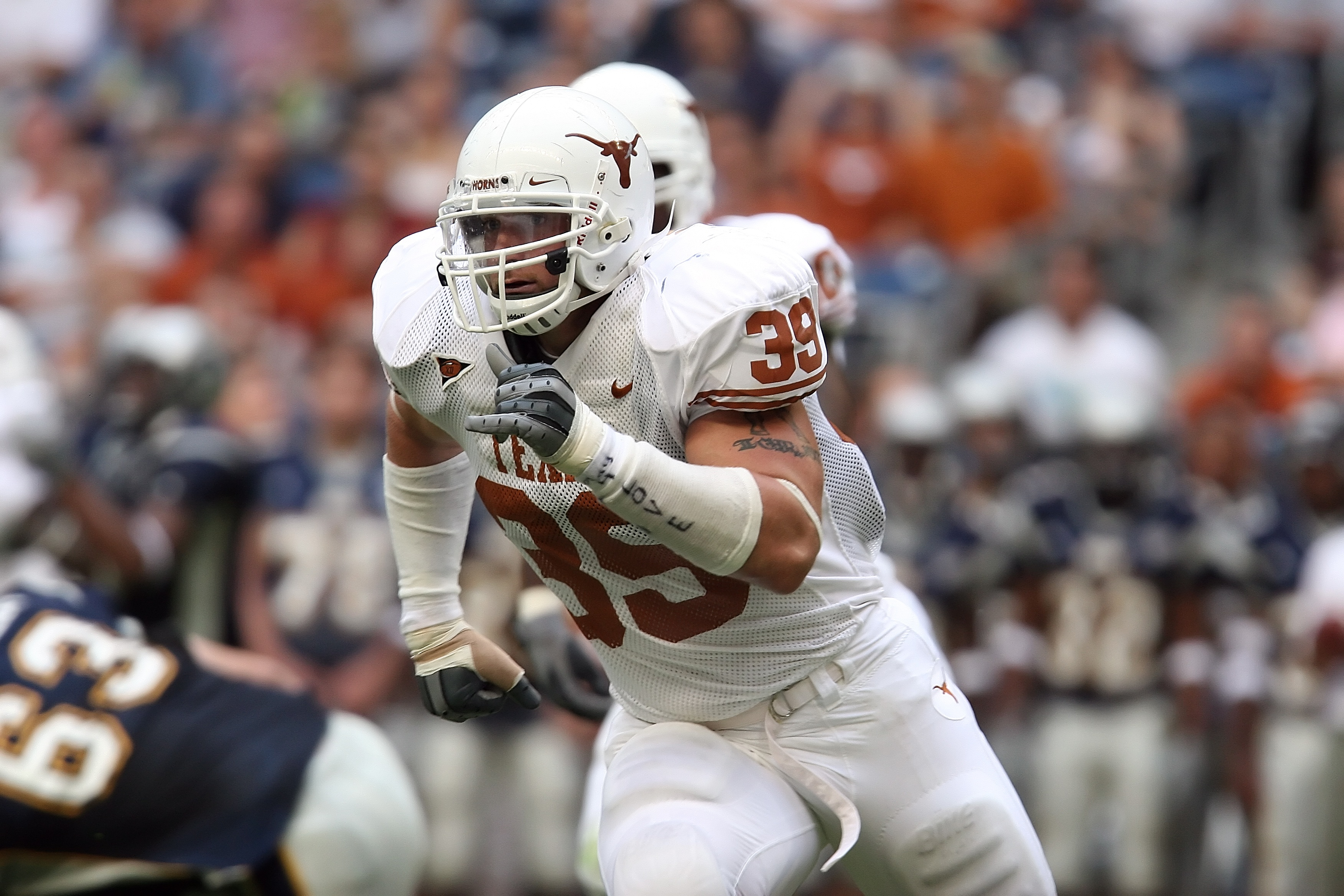
Robison with Texas in 2006

Robison played for the University of Texas at Austin. He was part of a Texas recruiting class which contained future NFL players Rodrique Wright, Justin Blalock, Aaron Ross, Kasey Studdard, Lyle Sendlein, David Thomas, Selvin Young, and Vince Young. This class has been cited as one of the strongest college recruiting classes ever. He was a member of their 2005 national championship team. During his career at the University of Texas, Robison was ranked 12th in school history with 41 tackles for loss. He tied a season record with four blocked kicks in 2003, and had a school-record six blocked kicks in his career. Robison totaled 181 tackles, with 106 solo tackles and 15 sacks.

Robison also starred in track and field at Texas, where he competed as a shot putter and posted the seventh-best discus throw mark in Texas history with a 59.69-meter effort.

At his campus workout at the University of Texas, he ran 4.67 in the 40-yard dash, posted a 470-pound bench press and 345-pound power clean.

Robison was a Liberal Arts major, and was on the University of Texas Honor Roll. He earned his degree before being drafted by Minnesota.

=== Freshman season ===
Robison redshirted in 2002. In 2003, he played all 13 games at middle linebacker, starting in three of those games. That year, he registered 38 tackles, 22 solo, one sack, and four stops for losses. In addition, he had 14 quarterback rushes and caused one fumble. He also had one deflected pass, and tied a school record with four blocked kicks.

=== Sophomore season ===
In Robison's sophomore campaign, he was an honorable mention on the Associated Press (AP) All-Big 12 Conference. He started all 12 games at right defensive end, and participated on special teams. Robison recorded 48 tackles, 27 solo, 1.5 sacks, and a two-yard interception. He finished second on the team with 14 stops for minus 26 yards, and 18 quarterback pressures.

During the 2004 track and field season, he earned a Big 12 title in the shot put in Manhattan, Kansas.

=== Junior season ===
During the 2005 season, Robison started in 12 games at right defensive end. He recorded a career-high 58 tackles, 35 solo, and led the team in quarterback sacks with seven. He also had 15 tackles behind the line of scrimmage. Robison was credited with 10 quarterback pressures, four pass deflections, and three forced fumbles. He also blocked one kick and recovered two fumbles. He was named First-team All-Big 12 Conference by Austin American-Statesman, adding Second-team honors from the Dallas Morning News, Houston Chronicle, and Fort-Worth Star Telegram and Honorable Mention from the leagues coaches and Associated Press.

=== Senior season ===
In Robison's final season at Texas, he was Honorable Mention All-Big 12 Conference, and battled through a rash of injuries, but still managed to start in 10 of 12 games at right defensive end. Robison suffered a deep right knee and patella tendon bruise, and a quadriceps muscle strain, that sat him out for two games. Even with all his injuries, he still managed to get 37 tackles, 22 solo, 5.5 sacks, and nine stops for loss. He also added 15 quarterback hurries, three deflected passes and a blocked kick.

In track and field, Robison finished second in the NCAA Outdoor Championships in the shot put with a career-best throw of 20.25 meters. His best discus throw mark in college was 59.69 meters, which ranks seventh in UT history.

== Professional career ==
Pre-draft measurables
Height	Weight	Arm length	Hand span	40-yard dash	10-yard split	20-yard split	20-yard shuttle	Three-cone drill	Vertical jump	Broad jump	Bench press
6 ft 3 1/8 in (1.91 m)	259 lb (117 kg)	33 1/8 in (0.84 m)	9 3/4 in (0.25 m)	4.74 s	1.66 s	2.74 s	4.26 s	6.89 s	40.5 in (1.03 m)	10 ft 1 in (3.07 m)	27 reps
All values from NFL Combine

=== 2007 season ===
Robison was selected by the Minnesota Vikings in the fourth round (102nd overall) of the 2007 NFL draft. He was one of seven Longhorns selected by professional football teams, with the others being Michael Griffin (19th overall) and Aaron Ross (20th overall) in the first round, Justin Blalock (39th overall) and Tim Crowder (56th overall) in the second, Tarell Brown in the fifth (number 147th overall) and Kasey Studdard in the sixth (number 183rd overall).

Robison appeared in all 16 games of his rookie season and made five starts at right defensive end. In his professional debut against the Atlanta Falcons in the season opener game, he notched a pair of sacks on quarterback Joey Harrington. In a week 4 game against the undefeated Green Bay Packers, Robison had five tackles and a sack of Brett Favre, who became the NFL's all-time leader in career touchdown passes during the game. His sack made him the last Vikings player to sack Favre. In the Vikings' 29–22 win over the Oakland Raiders in week 11, he was credited with a sack and a forced fumble. Robison earned All-Rookie honors after finishing his rookie campaign with 26 total tackles (20 of them solo), 4.5 sacks that ranked third among rookies and a forced fumble.

=== 2008 season ===
With Jared Allen established as the starter at the right defensive end spot, Robison saw action in 15 games as his primary backup. He started in place of injured left defensive end Ray Edwards in the Wild Card Playoff game against the Philadelphia Eagles on January 4, 2009, and was credited with a team-best 7 quarterback hurries while also registering 2 solo tackles and a tackle for a loss. In week 15, he notched his second sack and first forced fumble of the year when he knocked the ball free from Kurt Warner in the win at the Arizona Cardinals. Robison had 14 tackles (7 solo), 2.5 sacks and a forced fumble in his second season.

=== 2009 season ===
Robison competed in the shot put during the 2009 off-season, finishing first at a meet at the University of St. Thomas in Saint Paul, Minnesota. His throw of 60 feet 11 1/2 inches (18.580 meters) took first place by more than 5 feet at the Tomcat Twilight.

In his third season, Robison played in all 16 games and both playoff contests. He posted sacks in 3 of the final 4 regular season games (). In the Vikings' 30–23 win against the Green Bay Packers, he was credited with 1.5 of the 8.0 sacks the team had on Aaron Rodgers, a mark that was one sack shy of the Vikings team record in a game. Robison had a career-low 10 tackles on the season but also tied a then career-best with 4.5 sacks, the same mark he had his rookie year and ranked fourth on the team with 13 quarterback hurries.

=== 2010 season ===
Robison again played in all 16 games for a Vikings defense that ranked in the top-10 defenses in the NFL for the third straight season. He only started a pair of games in place of Ray Edwards, against the Bills on December 5 and the Giants the following week. He had two sacks on the year, with the first coming in week 3 against Detroit Lions when he caught Shaun Hill. After replacing Edwards in the second half of the game at Washington on November 28, he notched a sack of Donovan McNabb in the Vikings' 17–13 win over the Redskins. The following week, he had three tackles and recovered a pair of fumbles against the Buffalo Bills. Robison posted 15 tackles and 2.0 sacks, and recovered two fumbles as the Vikings finished the season with a 6–10 record.

=== 2011 season ===
Following the departure of Ray Edwards in 2011, Robison became a full-time starter and had a break-out year, starting all 16 games at left defensive end and recording then career-highs in tackles with 44, sacks with 8.0 that ranked second on the team behind Jared Allen (who had a league-best 22.0) and forced fumbles with 3. He was part of a Vikings' defensive line that produced 40.5 of the team's 50 sacks, which tied for the NFL lead and the third-most in team history. He started the season fast with 4.5 sacks in the opening 5 games, but his season ended up being best remembered for kicking Packers offensive lineman T. J. Lang in the groin in the week 7 game during a field goal try. Robison was fined $20,000 for the kick.

=== 2012 season ===
Robison again spent his second season as full-time starter at left defensive end opposite Jared Allen. He started all 15 games he played in the regular season and started the Wild Card playoff game against the Packers. He was credited with three passes defended against the Tampa Bay Buccaneers in week 6. On October 31, he recorded nine tackles, a forced fumble and a career-best 3.5 sacks as the Vikings defense notched seven sacks in the 21–14 win over the Arizona Cardinals in week 7. Robison's 8.5 sacks ranked second on the team again behind Jared Allen and he posted a career-high 7 passes defensed, tied for the second-most by a defensive lineman in a season in team history. He also ranked tied for second on the team with three forced fumbles.

=== 2013 season ===
Robison started all 16 games for the second time in his career. As one of the most unknown pass-rushers in the league, he earned a spot on USA Today's All-Joe Team, honoring the unsung players in the NFL. He led team with 40 quarterback hurries and notched career-highs with 14 tackles for loss and 9.0 sacks that ranked second on the team. He had sacks in 5 consecutive games that started in week 11 at Seattle and ended against the Philadelphia Eagles in week 15. In the week 2 loss at the Chicago Bears, he scored his first career touchdown when he recovered a fumble from Jay Cutler which was forced by Jared Allen and returned it 61 yards. The play was the third-longest fumble recovery by a Vikings defensive lineman.

=== 2014 season ===
Robison started all 16 games for the third time in his career and tallied 4.5 sacks on the year, with all of those coming in an 8-week span. He split a sack of Lions Matthew Stafford in week 6, brought down Mike Glennon at Tampa Bay in the 19–13 overtime win, leveled Redskins' Robert Griffin III the following week, chased down Aaron Rodgers in week 12 and met Jets rookie quarterback Geno Smith in the backfield on December 7. Robison compiled 24 tackles on the season and set a career-high with 45 quarterback pressures, good for second on the team.

=== 2015 season ===
In 2015, Robison completed his fifth season as a full-time starter at left defensive end, opening every game, including the wildcard playoff game. He notched 4.0 sacks in the final five regular season games as the team went on a three-game win streak to end the season 11–5 and clinch the NFC North title for the first time since 2009. During the season, he sacked both Manning brothers, Peyton in week 4 and Eli in week 15. In the Wildcard playoff heart-breaking loss to the Seattle Seahawks, he had 2.0 sacks of Russell Wilson. Robison finished his ninth year in the league with 34 tackles, 5 sacks and 4 passes defensed, his most since the 2012 season when he had batted down 7 passes.

=== 2016 season ===
Robison started at left defensive end the first game of the season at the Tennessee Titans and was credited with two tackles and a pass defended. In week 2 against the Green Bay Packers, Robison strip-sacked Aaron Rodgers from behind in the fourth quarter, causing him to fumble the ball for the second time in a game where Minnesota totaled five sacks for combined losses of 33 yards and forced a career-high three fumbles that helped the Vikings open their new stadium with a win. Against the Carolina Panthers in Week 3, Robison had a sack for the second straight week. Robison brought down Texans' quarterback Brock Osweiler two times in the Vikings' 31–13 win in Week 5.

=== 2017 season ===
On March 24, 2017, Robison signed a one-year contract extension with the Vikings through the 2018 season.

On September 1, 2018, Robison was released by the Vikings after 11 seasons with the team.

On April 24, 2019, Robison announced his retirement from the NFL after signing a one-day contract with the Vikings.

== Career statistics ==
=== NFL ===
Regular season statistics				Tackles					Interceptions						Fumbles			
Season	Team	GP	GS	Comb	Total	Ast	Sck	Sfty	PDef	Int	Yds	Avg	Lng	TDs	FF	FR	FR YDS	TDs
2007	MIN	16	5	26	20	6	4.5	—	0	0	0	0.0	0	0	1	0	0	0
2008	MIN	15	0	14	7	7	2.5	—	0	0	0	0.0	0	0	1	0	0	0
2009	MIN	16	0	10	8	2	4.5	—	0	0	0	0.0	0	0	0	0	0	0
2010	MIN	16	2	15	13	2	2.0	—	0	0	0	0.0	0	0	0	2	0	0
2011	MIN	16	16	44	27	17	8.0	—	1	0	0	0.0	0	0	3	2	0	0
2012	MIN	15	15	37	26	11	8.5	—	7	0	0	0.0	0	0	3	1	0	0
2013	MIN	16	16	37	25	12	9.0	—	3	0	0	0.0	0	0	0	1	61	1
2014	MIN	16	16	24	17	7	4.5	—	2	0	0	0.0	0	0	0	0	0	0
2015	MIN	16	16	34	30	4	5.0	—	3	0	0	0.0	0	0	1	2	0	0
2016	MIN	16	16	28	18	10	7.5	—	1	0	0	0.0	0	0	3	0	0	0
2017	MIN	15	1	20	15	5	4.0	—	2	0	0	0.0	0	0	0	0	0	0
Totals		173	103	289	206	83	60	—	19	0	0	0.0	0	0	13	8	61	1

=== College ===
Regular season statistics				Tackles					Interceptions						Fumbles		
Season	Team	GP	GS	Comb	Total	Ast	Sck	Tfl	PDef	Int	Yds	Avg	Lng	TDs	FF	FR	FR YDS
2003	Texas	13	3	38	22	16	1.0	4.0	1	0	0	0.0	0	0	1	0	0
2004	Texas	12	12	48	27	21	1.5	14.0	0	1	2	2.0	2	1	2	0	0
2005	Texas	12	12	58	35	23	7.0	15.0	4	0	0	0.0	0	0	0	0	0
2006	Texas	12	10	37	22	15	5.5	9.0	3	0	0	0.0	0	0	1	1	9
Totals		49	37	181	106	75	15.0	42.0	8	1	2	2.0	2	1	4	1	9
