= Savannah Fire & Emergency Services =

Fire and Emergency Service Provider for a US City

Savannah Fire & Emergency Services (SFES) provides fire protection to the city of Savannah, Georgia, United States. The professional fire department is active 24/7 and 365 days a year, and has about 325 paid employees. They received an ISO Class 1 rating in November 2014, and CFAI accreditation in 2016.

== History ==
Fire protection in Savannah was first organized in the British-administered Province of Georgia in 1759 with a volunteer force of firefighters. On March 11, 1825, the Savannah Fire Company was officially formed. On February 1, 1867, the Savannah Volunteer Fire Department was established, and on February 1, 1890, the Savannah Fire Department was established as a paid firefighting force of 47 men. In 1911, the Savannah Fire Department became the first fully motorized fire department in the United States.

City officials announced the closure of the Downtown company in November 2018, due to budgetary reasons. Both Engine 16, and Marine One would be placed on a minimal maintenance schedule, with the 15 firefighters assigned to the station dispersed to other stations.

== Organization ==
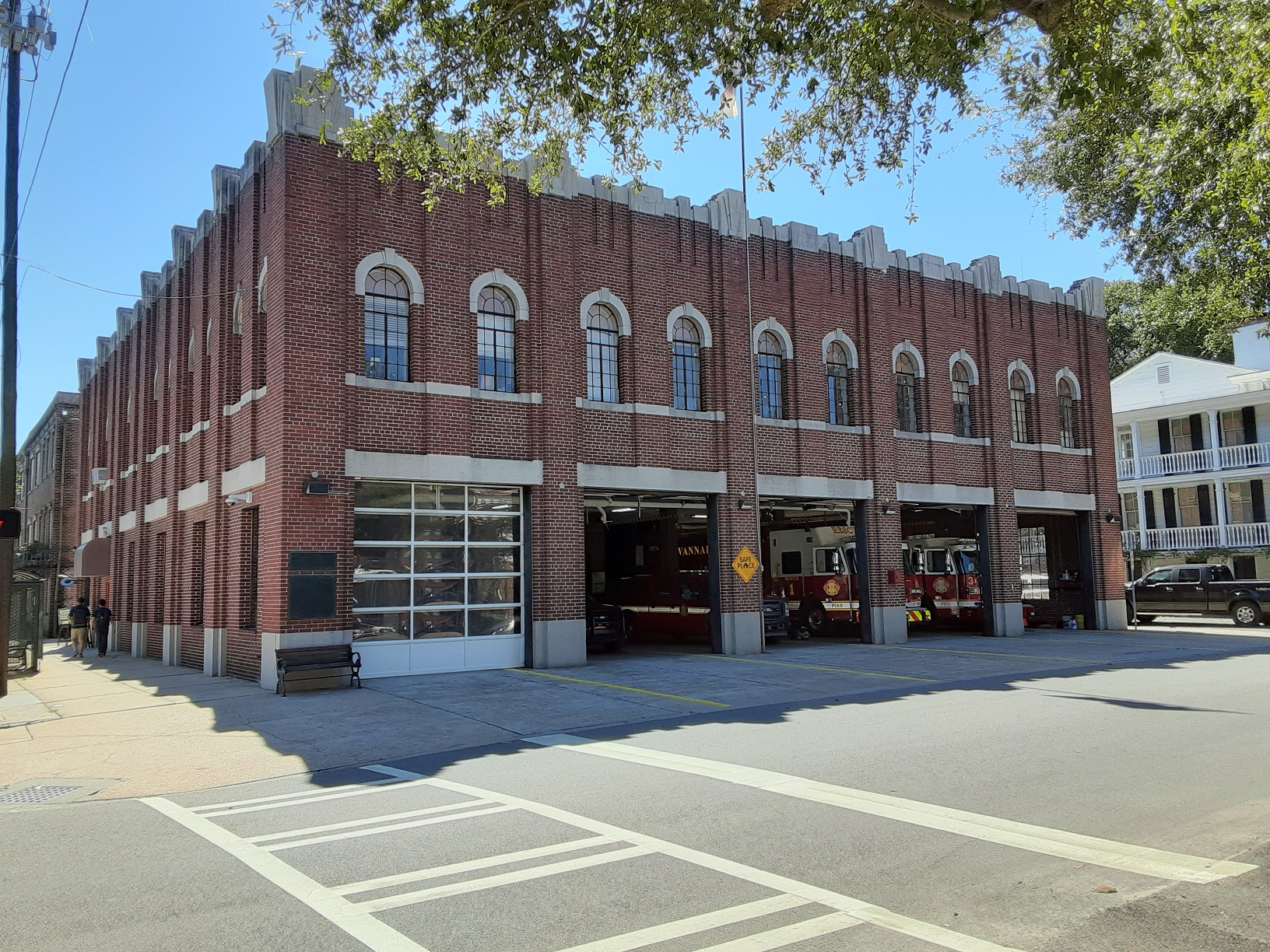
A Savannah Fire Department fire station

Savannah Fire and Emergency Services is divided into 6 divisions of operation: Operations, Training, Logistics, Special Operations, Investigations, and the Fire Marshal's Division.

The Savannah fire department currently operates out of 15 fire stations located throughout the city; it is organized into 3 battalions, each commanded by one battalion chief each shift. The SFES operates a fire apparatus fleet of 15 engine companies, 5 ladder companies, 2 rescue companies, 4 hazardous materials (haz-mat.) units, 1 haz-mat./decontamination (decon.) trailer, 2 marine units (fireboat), 1 rehabilitation (rehab.) unit, 2 brush units, 1 Georgia Search and Rescue (GSAR) trailer, and numerous special, support, and reserve units.
