= John Middleton (cricketer) =

English cricketer

John William Middleton (26 October 1890 – 16 September 1966) was an English cricketer active from 1914 to 1921 who played for Leicestershire. He was born and died in Stoney Stanton. He appeared in 24 first-class matches as a righthanded batsman who scored 478 runs with a highest score of 37.
