= David Middleton (cricketer) =

English cricketer

Personal information
- Full name: David Barrie Middleton
- Born: 13 October 1965 (age 61); Bloxwich, Staffordshire, England
- Batting: Right-handed
- Role: Wicketkeeper

Domestic team information
- Years: Team
- 2001: Worcestershire Cricket Board

Career statistics
Competition	LA
Matches	2
Runs scored	7
Batting average	7.00
100s/50s	–/–
Top score	7
Balls bowled	–
Wickets	–
Bowling average	–
5 wickets in innings	–
10 wickets in match	–
Best bowling	–
Catches/stumpings	3/–
- Source: Cricinfo, 2 November 2010

David Barrie Middleton (born 13 October 1965) is a former English cricketer. Middleton was a right-handed batsman who played primarily as a wicketkeeper. He was born at Bloxwich, Staffordshire.

Middleton represented the Worcestershire Cricket Board in 2 List A matches against Staffordshire in the 2001 Cheltenham & Gloucester Trophy and Buckinghamshire in the 1st round of the 2002 Cheltenham & Gloucester Trophy which was played in 2001. In his 2 List A matches, he scored 7 runs at a batting average of 7.00, with a high score of 7. Behind the stumps he took 2 catches.
