= Peter Middleton =

Peter Middleton may refer to:

- Sir Peter Middleton (banker) (born 1934), British businessman, banker and chancellor of the University of Sheffield
- Peter Middleton (footballer) (1948–1977), English footballer
- Peter Middleton (motorcyclist) (1931–2019), British motorcycle rider
- Peter Middleton (MP) (1603–1661), English merchant and politician
- Peter Francis Middleton (1920–2010), grandfather of Catherine, Princess of Wales
- M. Peter Middleton (born 1946), British-born American politician
