= Charlie Middleton (footballer) =

English footballer

Personal information
- Full name: Charles William Middleton
- Date of birth: 22 November 1910
- Place of birth: West Stanley, England
- Date of death: 1984 (aged 73–74)
- Height: 5 ft 9 in (1.75 m)
- Position: Inside forward

Senior career*
Years	Team	Apps	(Gls)
1933–1934	Walker Celtic		
1934–1935	Stoke City	0	(0)
1935–1936	West Stanley		
1936–1937	Hartlepools United	1	(0)
1937	Walker Celtic		
Total		1	(0)
- * Club domestic league appearances and goals

Charles William Middleton (8 February 1910 – 1984) was a footballer who played in the Football League for Hartlepools United.

== Early life ==
Middleton was born in West Stanley.

== Career ==
He began his career with Walker Celtic before moving to Stoke City in the 1934–35 season. He left at the end of the campaign without breaking into the first team and he returned to the North East with West Stanley. He played one Football League match for Hartlepools United in the 1936–37 campaign which came in a 2–0 defeat away at Halifax Town on 12 September 1936.

== Career statistics ==
Appearances and goals by club, season and competition
Club	Season	League			FA Cup		Total	
Club	Season	Division	Apps	Goals	Apps	Goals	Apps	Goals
Stoke City	1934–35	First Division	0	0	0	0	0	0
Hartlepools United	1936–37	Third Division North	1	0	0	0	1	0
Career total			1	0	0	0	1	0
