= Charles R. Middleton =

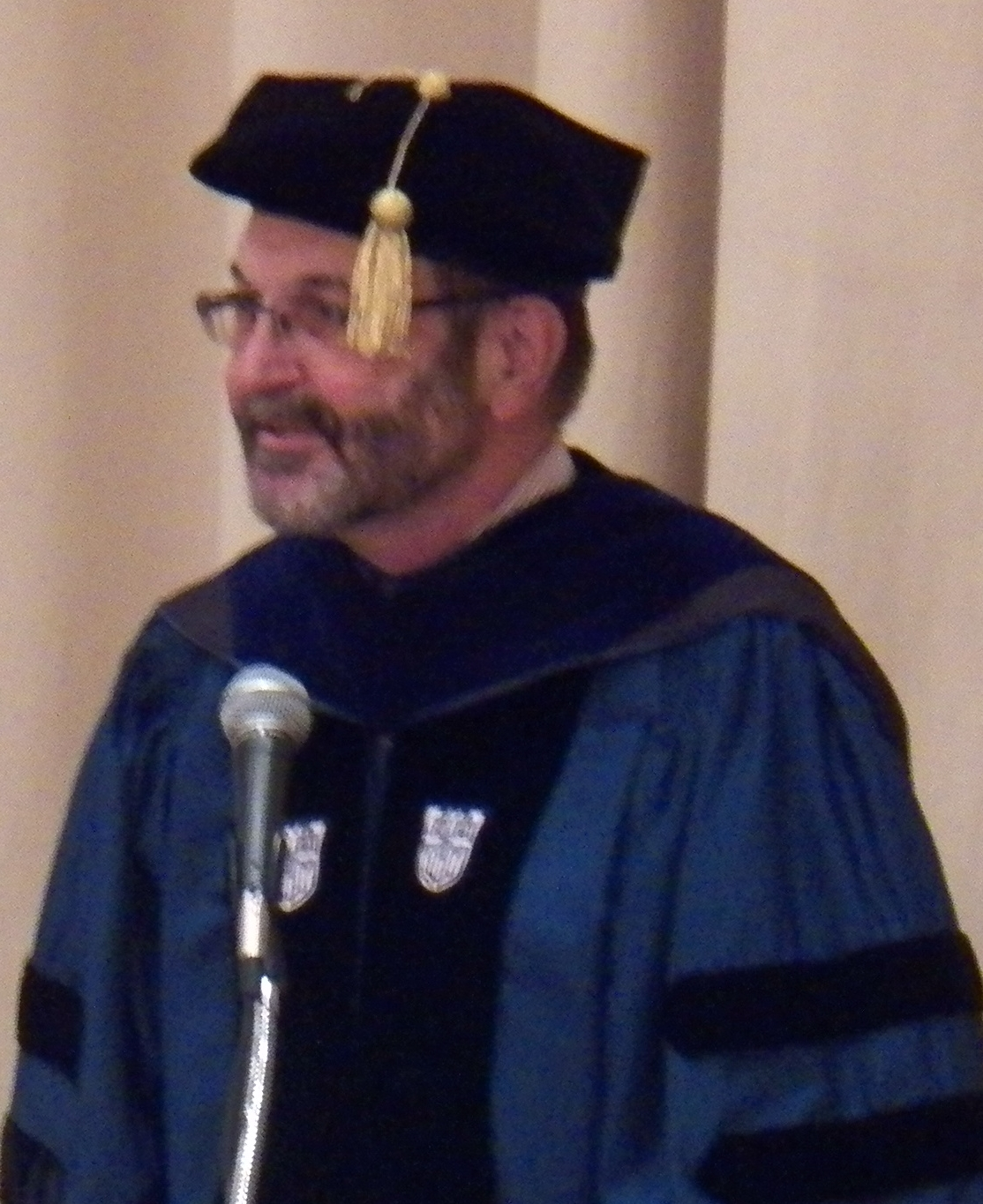
- Charles Middleton speaking at a Shimer College event in 2013.

President Emeritus of Roosevelt University
- In office 2002–2015
- Preceded by: Theodore Gross

Personal details
- Born: September 16, 1944 (age 82) Hays, Kansas
- Spouse: Life Partner: Professor John S. Geary
- Children: Charles C., Kevin A., Kathryn G.
- Education: Florida State University; Duke University
- Profession: Academic Administrator and Historian

Charles R. Middleton served as the President of Roosevelt University from 2002 to 2015 when he retired.

== Biography ==
Middleton graduated with his bachelor's degree from Florida State University. He received both his master's degree and Doctorate from Duke University.

He served as Vice Chancellor for Academic Affairs at the University System of Maryland, Provost and Vice President of Academic Affairs at Bowling Green State University, and Dean of the College of Arts and Sciences at the University of Colorado at Boulder. In 2002 he became the President of Roosevelt University.

He is a member of the Royal Historical Society, the American Historical Association, the North American Conference on British Studies among others.

He served on the board of the American Council on Education and the Federation of Independent Illinois Colleges and Universities. He has also been involved with the National Association of Independent Colleges and Universities, the Chicago 2016 Olympic Bid Committee, the Chicago Loop Alliance, the Roosevelt Institute, the Center on Halsted, the Chicago Central Area Committee, the Near South Planning Board, the Point Foundation and the Chicago History Museum Community Advisory Council, Rotary One, the Economic Club of Chicago, the Executives' Club, the Commercial Club of Chicago, Equality Illinois, and the Human Rights Campaign. He serves on the Boards of SAGE USA and PFLAG National. He is a signatory of the Amethyst Initiative. From 2015 to 2017 he served as chair of the Board of Trustees of the City Colleges of Chicago.

He is openly gay. In November 2006, Dr. Middleton was elected to the Chicago Gay and Lesbian Hall of Fame. In spring 2010 he gave the keynote address at the conference "25 Years After: GLBT in Higher Education" at Texas A&M University, commemorating the 25th anniversary of the legal decision forcing Texas A&M to recognize Gay Student Services as an official student organization.

== Bibliography ==
- The Administration of British Foreign Policy, 1782-1846
