= William Middleton (writer) =

American journalist

William Middleton is a journalist and author. He has written for multiple publications and is known for his 2018 biography of French/American art patrons and collectors Dominique de Menil and John de Menil.

== Career ==
=== Journalism ===
Middleton was the Paris bureau chief for Fairchild Publications (Fairchild Fashion Media), overseeing W,and Women's Wear Daily. He has also served as the Fashion Features Director for Harper's Bazaar. He has written for multiple publications that include the New York Times, Architectural Digest, Town & Country, and Elle Décor.

=== Books ===
In 2018, Middleton published Double Vision, a biography of French/American art patrons and collectors Dominique de Menil and John de Menil, through Alfred A. Knopf. The publisher billed the work as the "first and definitive biography of the celebrated collectors". The book was launched on March 27, 2018, at the Rothko Chapel in Houston, Texas. It was received favorably by critics and in December 2019, was named one of the best art books of the decade by ARTnews.

As of 2019, Middleton has begun writing a biography of Karl Lagerfeld, to be published by HarperCollins.

== Bibliography ==
- Double Vision (2018, Alfred A. Knopf)
- PARADISE NOW: The Extraordinary Life of Karl Lagerfeld, biography of Karl Lagerfeld (TBA, HarperCollins)
