= Middleton Township =

Middleton Township may refer to:

- Middleton Township, Lafayette County, Missouri
- Middleton Township, Columbiana County, Ohio
- Middleton Township, Wood County, Ohio
- North Middleton Township, Pennsylvania
- South Middleton Township, Pennsylvania
- Middleton Township, Turner County, South Dakota, in Turner County, South Dakota
