= Splendora Independent School District =

School district in Texas, United States

Address
- 23419 FM 2090 Splendora, Texas, 77372; United States

District information
- Type: Public
- Motto: Cultivating Exceptional People
- Grades: PK–12
- Superintendent: Jeffrey Burke
- Governing agency: Texas Education Agency
- Schools: 5
- NCES District ID: 4841070

Students and staff
- Enrollment: 4,108 (2018–2019)
- Teachers: 251.77 (on an FTE basis)
- Staff: 301.22 (on an FTE basis)
- Student–teacher ratio: 15.12

Other information
- Website: www.splendoraisd.org

Splendora Independent School District (SISD) is a public school district based in Splendora, Texas (USA). In addition to Splendora, the district also serves the city of Patton Village. A small portion of the city of Cleveland and a section of Deerwood are also within the district.

For the 2018–2019 school year, the district received a B grade from the Texas Education Agency.

== Academics ==
For each school year, the Texas Education Agency rates school district performance using an A–F grading system based on statistical data. For 2018–2019, the district received a score of 83 out of 100, resulting in a B grade. The district received a similar score of 81 the previous year.

Splendora ISD has partnered with Lone Star College–Kingwood to create the Splendora Early College High School program. Students enrolled in the program attend college courses, paid for by the school district, while also completing the requirements for a high school diploma. Students who complete the program will earn an associate degree. College credit may also be applied to up to two years of a bachelor's degree.

== Schools ==
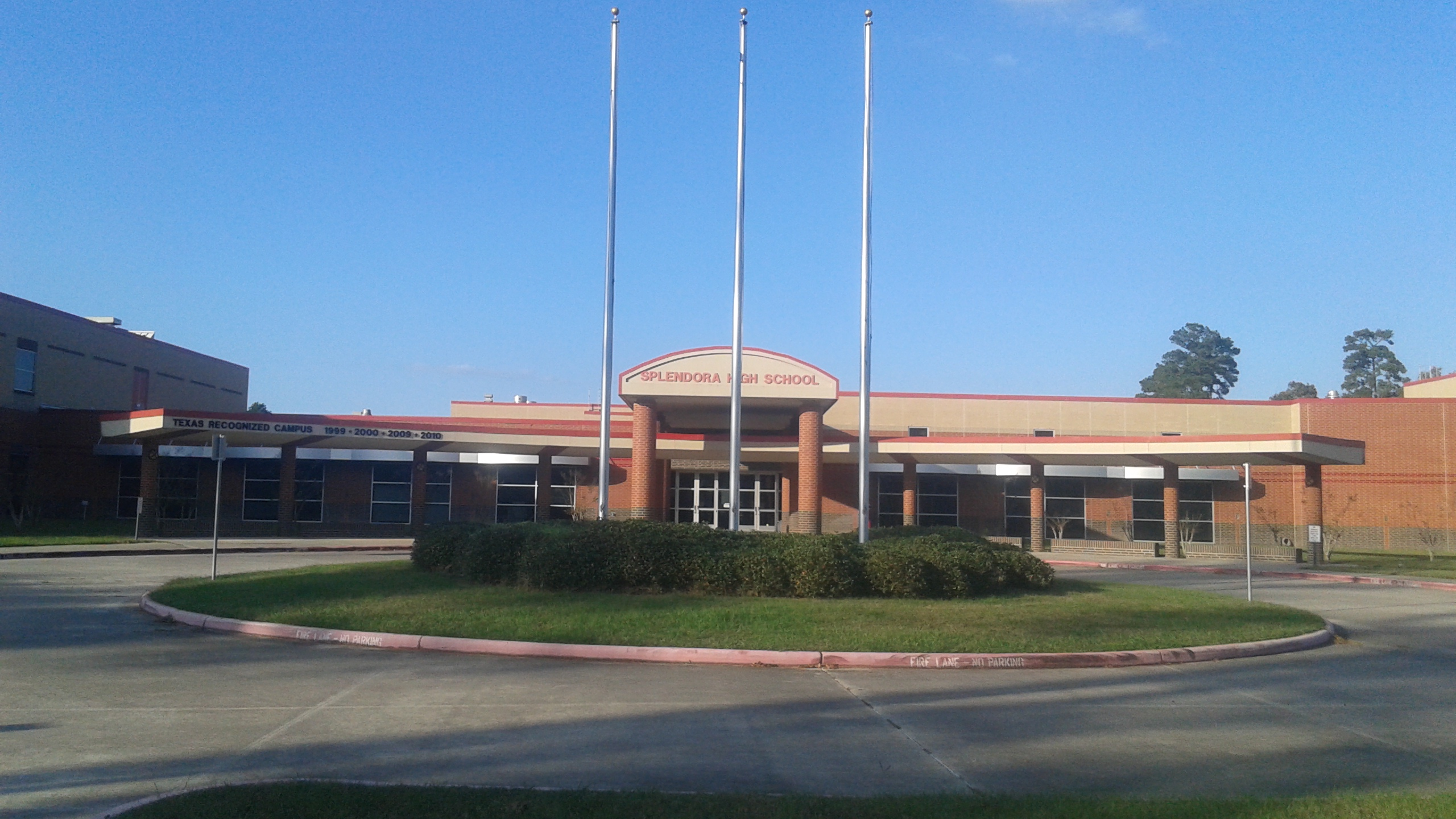
Splendora High School

- Splendora High School (Grades 9-12)
- Splendora Junior High (Grades 7-8)
- Greenleaf Elementary (Grades PK-6)
- Peach Creek Elementary (Grades PK-6)
- Piney Woods Elementary (Grades PK-6)
- Timber Lakes Elementary (Grades PK-6)
