= Campbell Middleton =

Professor of engineering

Campbell R. Middleton ( ) was the Laing O'Rourke Professor of Construction Engineering at the University of Cambridge, and director of the Laing O'Rourke Centre for Construction Engineering & Technology in the Cambridge Department of Engineering.

It was announced that Professor Middleton died on the 11th of March 2026

== Biography ==
He holds a BE (Hons), MSc, DIC, PhD, and CEng, CPEng, FICE, MIE (Aust), and joined the staff at Cambridge in 1989, becoming a Fellow of King's College, Cambridge He previously worked for nearly 10 years in bridge and highway construction and design in Australia and with Arup in London.

== Career ==
The main areas of research are computational collapse analysis, risk and reliability analysis, computer vision for structural evaluation, non-destructive testing and inspection, wireless sensor networks for structural health monitoring, and sustainability evaluation of constructed facilities. He has also been involved in the development of bridge codes of practice and is a specialist bridge consultant to clients in the UK and abroad.

== Honours ==
He was Chairman of the UK Bridge Owners Forum, established in 2000 by representatives of the bridge owning organisations in the UK. He has been awarded the Diploma of the Henry Adams Award of the Institution of Structural Engineers (1999) and the Telford Premium Award (1999) and Telford Gold Medal (2010) from the Institution of Civil Engineers. He was elected Fellow of the Transport Research Foundation in 2005 and a Fellow of the Royal Academy of Engineering in 2024.

== Selected publications ==
- Hoult, N.A., Fidler, P.R.A., Hill, P.G. and Middleton, C.R. (2010) Long-term Wireless Structural Health Monitoring of the Ferriby Road Bridge. ASCE Journal of Bridge Engineering, 15(2), 153–159. 6pp.
- Hoult, N.A., Fidler, P.R.A., Hill, P.G. and Middleton, C.R. (2010) Wireless Structural Health Monitoring of Bridges: Present and Future. International Journal of Smart Structures and Systems, 6(3).
- Hoult, N.A., Bennett, P.J., Stoianov, I. Maksimovic, C., Middleton, C.R., Graham, N.J.D. and Soga, K. (2009). Wireless Sensor Networks: creating 'Smart Infrastructure'. Proceedings of ICE – Civil Engineering, 162(3), 136–143. This paper was awarded the 2010 Institution of Civil Engineers Telford Gold Medal
- Hoult, N.A., Bennett, P.J., Soga, K. and Middleton, C.R. (2009). Smart Infrastructure: Pervasive WSNs for a more Sustainable Europe. Proceedings of the 4th International Conference on Structural Health Monitoring of Intelligent Infrastructure, 8pp.
- Hoult, N.A., Fidler, P.R.A., Wassell, I.J., Hill, P.G. and Middleton, C.R. (2008). Wireless Structural Health Monitoring at the Humber Bridge. Proceedings of ICE – Bridge Engineering, 161(BE4), 189–195.
- Middleton, C.R. (2007) Bridge assessment chapter in Modeling Complex Engineering Structures, ASCE, Editors R.E.Melchers & R.Hough. ISBN 9780784408506.
