= Henry Middleton (disambiguation) =

Henry Middleton may refer to:

- Sir Henry Middleton (captain) (died 1613), English sea captain and adventurer
- Henry Middleton (1717–1784), American plantation owner and public official from South Carolina
- Henry Middleton (governor) (1770–1846), American politician from South Carolina
- Henry A. Middleton (1888–1975), American lawyer from Ohio

== See also ==
- Harry Middleton (disambiguation)
