= High Desert State Prison =

High Desert State Prison may refer to:

- High Desert State Prison (California)
- High Desert State Prison (Nevada)
