= Middleton, Utah =

Neighborhood in St. George, Utah, United States

- Neighborhood
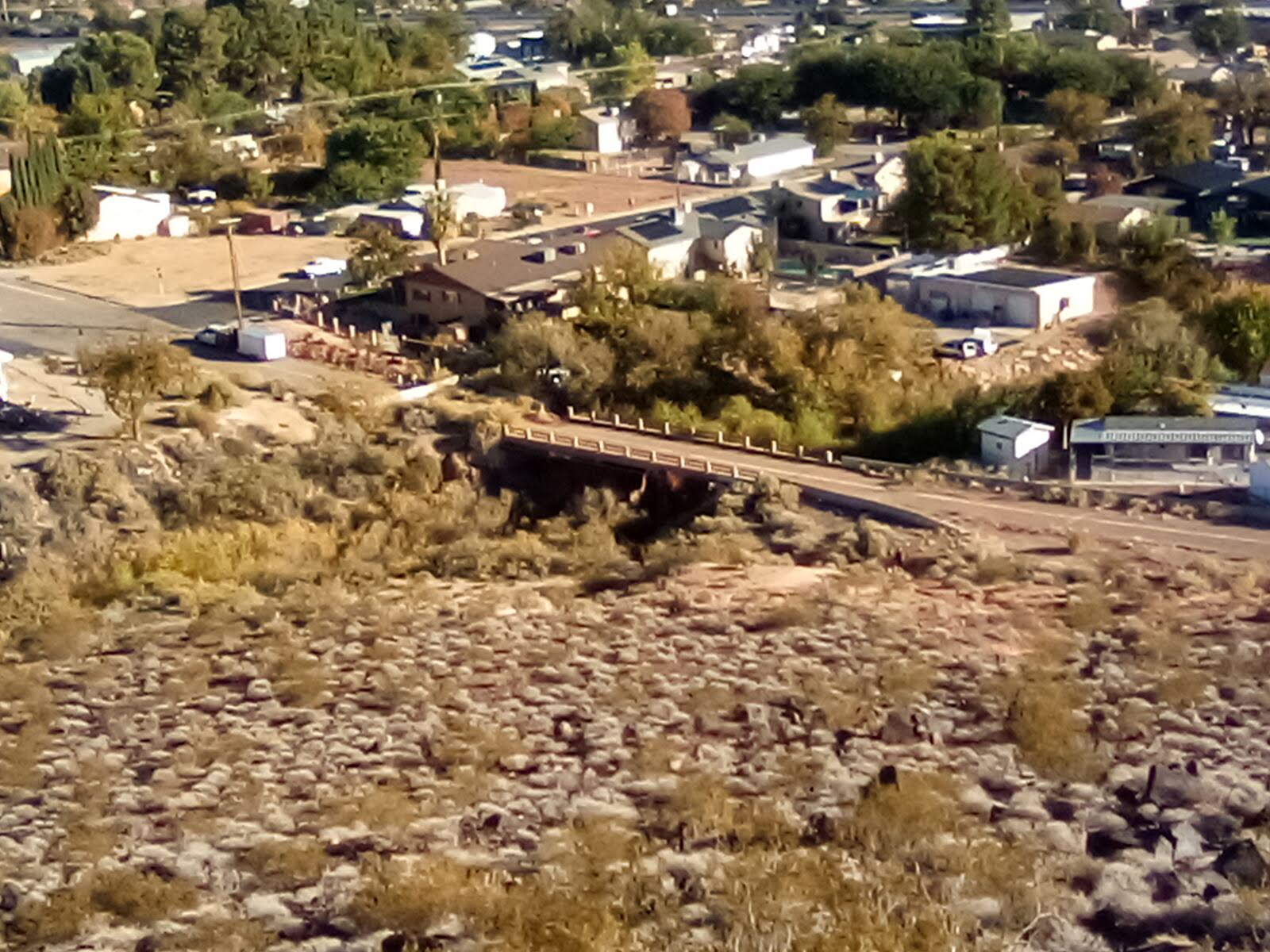
- A bridge that was part of Old Highway 91 in Middleton, November 2022

- Location within Utah Location within the United States
- Coordinates: 37°7′14.93″N 113°32′26.84″W
- Country: United States
- State: Utah
- County: Washington
- Founded: 1863
- Elevation: 2,858 ft (871 m)
- Time zone: UTC−7 (MST)
  - Summer (DST): UTC−6 (MDT)
- ZIP code: 84770
- Area code: 435
- FIPS code: 49-49490
- GNIS ID: 1437636

Middleton is a community in Washington County, Utah, United States. About halfway between St. George and Washington, it is located on the east side of the Old Dixie Highway 91 tunnel, its main road, "Middleton Drive", is part of the old highway.

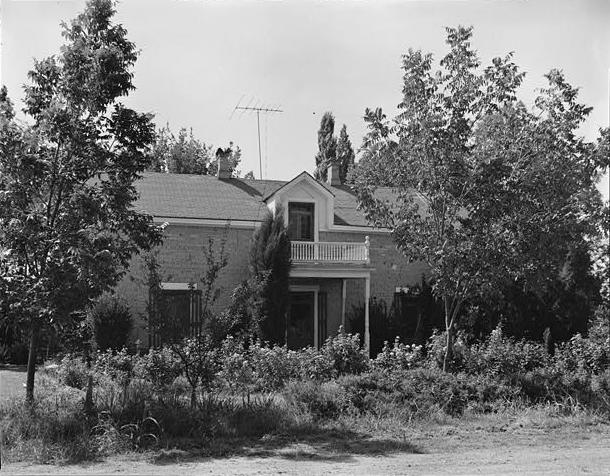
August 1968 photograph of the Macdonald Home taken by P. Kent Fairbanks

== History ==
It was founded in 1863, although it is now within the city limits of St. George (zip code 84770).

The first house in Middleton was built in 1872 by Alexander F. Macdonald.

== Geography ==
=== Natural features ===
- Middleton Black Ridge (split in half by I-15)
- Forest Park Pond

=== Parks ===
- Middleton Park
- Forest Park (National Forest Reserve)
- National Turtle Reserve

=== Historic Locations ===
- Macdonald Home

== Demographics ==
Statistics (2023):

- The population is 39,131.
- The average home value is $245,000.
- The median age is 30.8.
- The average number of people per household is 2.80.
