= Kate Middleton (free-diver) =

New Zealand freediver (born 1987)

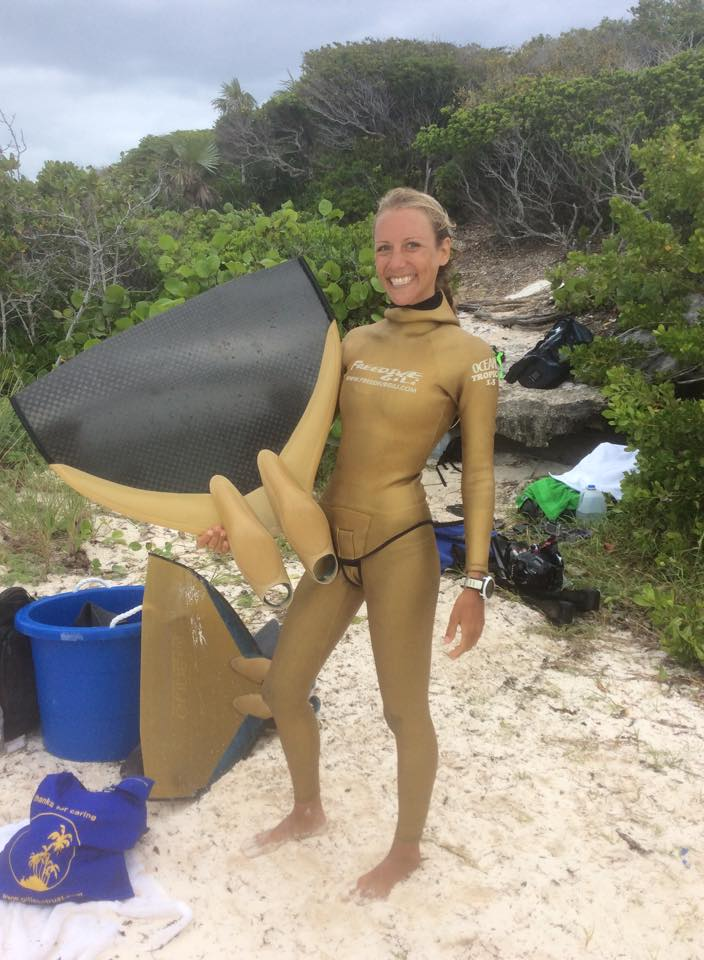
Freediving CWF Kate Middleton from New Zealand

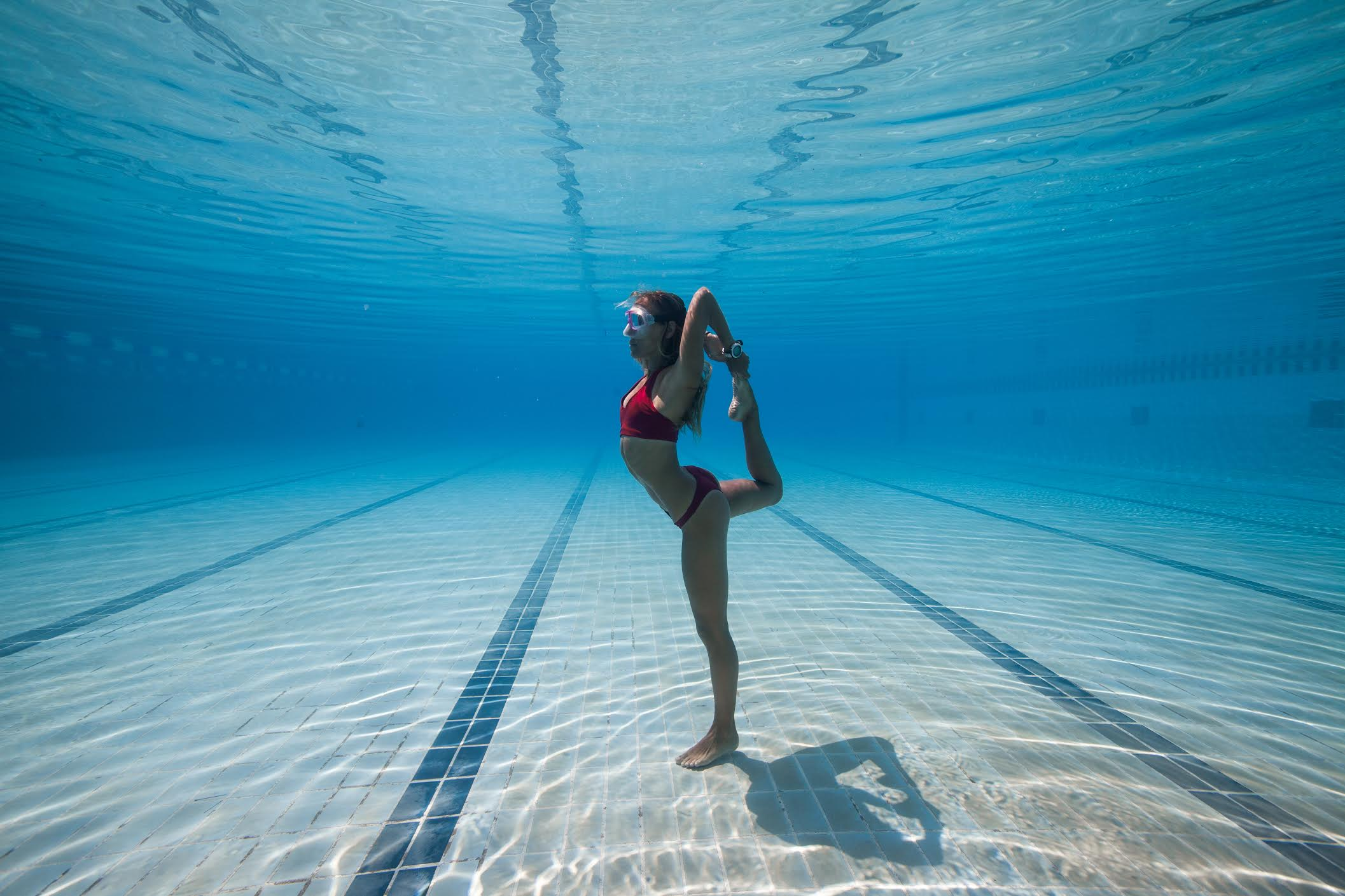
Kate Middleton is a yoga instructor.

Kate Middleton (born 23 December 1987) is a New Zealand-born somatic therapist, embodiment coach, and former professional freediver. She co-founded a yoga and freediving centre in Gili Trawangan, Indonesia, where she taught breathwork, underwater movement, and body-based healing practices. As a freediver, Middleton set 18 national records and earned a silver medal in Constant Weight with Fins (CWT) at the 2015 AIDA Depth World Championships, ranking among the top three women globally in depth for that discipline.

== New Zealand records ==
- 97 metres in CWT at Vertical Blue 2017, Bahamas (bronze medal)
- 84 metres in FIM at Vertical Blue 2017, Bahamas (gold medal)
- 85 metres in CWT at Vertical Blue 2016, Bahamas
- 72 metres CWT and 76 metres FIM at Cyprus, Limasol, Depth World Championship 11–20 September 2015 (silver medal)
- 68 metres CWT and 73 metres FIM at Vertical Blue 2014, Bahamas, Bali, December 2014
- 66 metres CWT at the One Breath Jamboree, Tulamben, Bali, October 2013
- 65 metres FIM at the One Breath Jamboree, Tulamben, Bali, October 2013
- 61 metres in FIM at the AIDA Individual World Championships, Kalamata, Greece, September 2013

An in-depth movie was made in 2012 about her life in Indonesia.
