= Splendora, Texas =

Splendora
- City
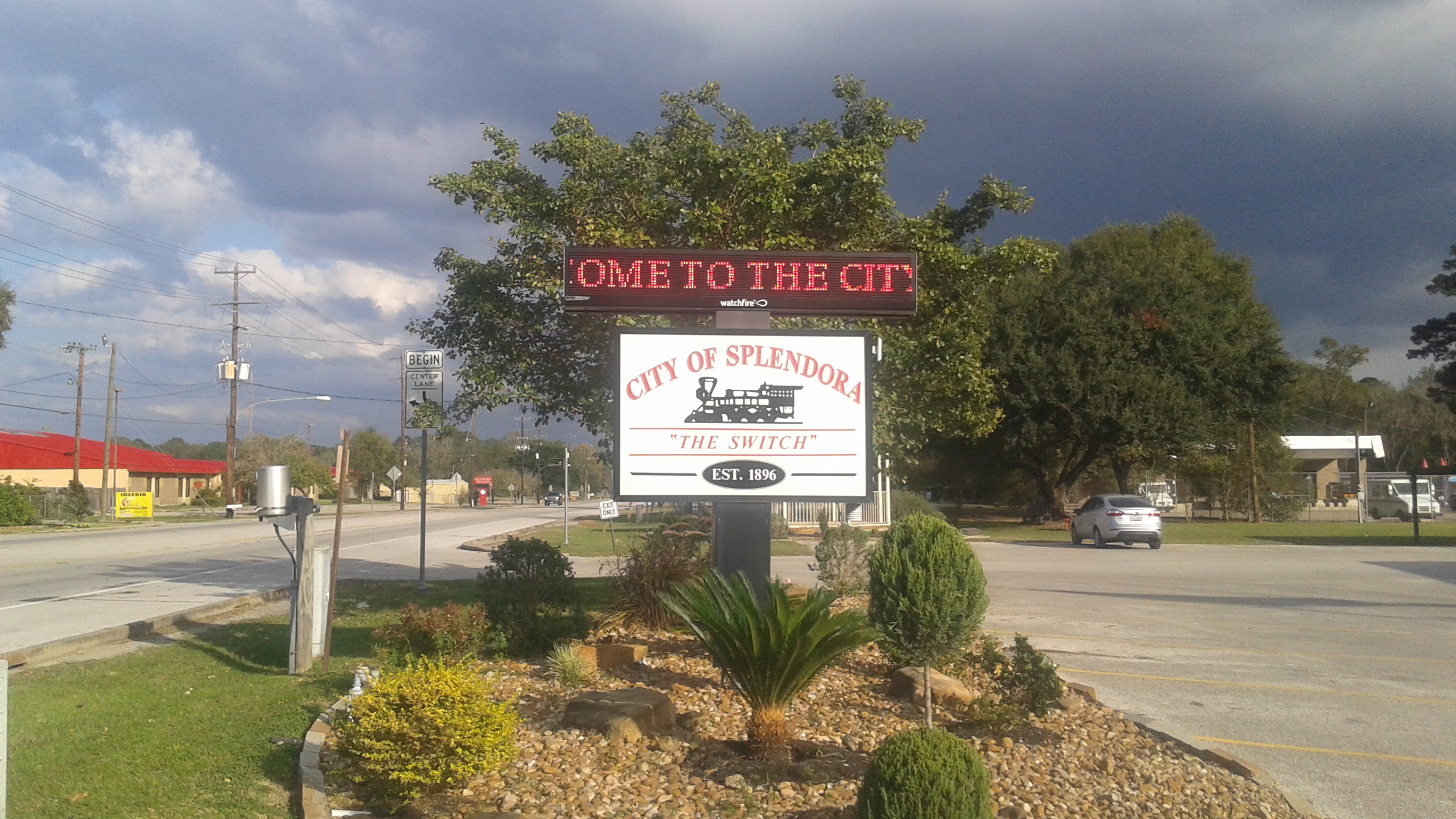
- Welcome sign outside of city hall
- Nickname: The Switch 1896
- Splendora located within Montgomery County

- Location in Texas Location in the United States
- Coordinates: 30°13′13″N 95°10′2″W
- Country: United States
- State: Texas
- Counties: Montgomery
- Incorporated: 1966

Government
  - Mayor: Dorothy Welch
  - City Council: Evelyn Myers; Mike Clark; Carlos Hernandez; William Usher

Area
  - Total: 3.07 sq mi (7.95 km^{2})
  - Land: 3.04 sq mi (7.87 km^{2})
  - Water: 0.027 sq mi (0.07 km^{2})

Population (2020)
  - Total: 1,683
  - Density: 741.7/sq mi (286.36/km^{2})
- Time zone: UTC-6 (Central (CST))
  - Summer (DST): UTC-5 (CDT)
- ZIP code: 77372
- Area code: 281
- FIPS code: 48-69548
- GNIS feature ID: 1347662
- Website: cityofsplendora.org

Splendora is a city in Montgomery County, Texas, United States. The population was 1,683 at the 2020 census. Splendora was named in reference to the "splendor of its floral environment."

== History ==
In the late 1800s, The Houston, East and West Texas Railway (now the Union Pacific Railroad), at the suggestion of Charles Cox, decided to build a narrow-gauge spur at the location of what is now Splendora. The location was originally known as "Cox's Switch." The area slowly grew more populated after W.W. Burrow built a general store in the area in 1883. In 1896, Cox recommended to the town's postmaster, Milton Z. King, that the town's name should be changed. They decided to change the name to Splendora because of the "splendor of its floral environment." The town was incorporated in December 1966.

== Geography ==
Splendora is located at 30°13′13″N 95°10′2″W (30.220237, –95.167232), which is approximately 37 miles north-northeast of Houston, Texas.

According to the United States Census Bureau, the city has a total area of 2.1 square miles (5.4 km^{2}), all land.

== Demographics ==
Historical population
Census	Pop.	Note	%±
1970	194		—
1980	721		271.6%
1990	745		3.3%
2000	1,275		71.1%
2010	1,615		26.7%
2020	1,683		4.2%
U.S. Decennial Census

=== 2020 census ===
As of the 2020 census, Splendora had a population of 1,683 people, 545 households, and 519 families residing in the city. The median age was 34.8 years, 28.2% of residents were under the age of 18, and 14.0% of residents were 65 years of age or older. For every 100 females there were 101.3 males, and for every 100 females age 18 and over there were 101.0 males age 18 and over.

There were 545 households in Splendora, of which 44.6% had children under the age of 18 living in them. Of all households, 56.3% were married-couple households, 15.8% were households with a male householder and no spouse or partner present, and 20.9% were households with a female householder and no spouse or partner present. About 16.0% of all households were made up of individuals and 6.1% had someone living alone who was 65 years of age or older.

There were 604 housing units, of which 9.8% were vacant. The homeowner vacancy rate was 1.5% and the rental vacancy rate was 10.6%.

28.0% of residents lived in urban areas, while 72.0% lived in rural areas.

Racial composition as of the 2020 census
Race	Number	Percent
White	1,326	78.8%
Black or African American	15	0.9%
American Indian and Alaska Native	16	1.0%
Asian	13	0.8%
Native Hawaiian and Other Pacific Islander	1	0.1%
Some other race	148	8.8%
Two or more races	164	9.7%
Hispanic or Latino (of any race)	371	22.0%

=== 2010 census ===
As of the 2010 United States census, there were 1,615 people, 548 households, and 306 families residing in the city. The racial makeup of the city was 92.6% White, 1.1% African American, 0.2% Native American, 0.7% Asian, 3.3% from other races, and 2.0% from two or more races. Hispanic or Latino of any race were 9.8% of the population.

There were 548 households, out of which 39.2% had children under the age of 18 living with them, 55.8% were married couples living together, 14.2% had a female householder with no husband present, and 23.4% were non-families. 17.9% of all households were made up of individuals. The average household size was 2.95 and the average family size was 3.33.

In the city, the population was spread out, with 30.8% under the age of 18, 8.7% from 18 to 24, 28.3% from 25 to 44, 21.3% from 45 to 64, and 8.7% who were 65 years of age or older. The median age was 32.6 years. For every 100 females, there were 91.8 males. For every 100 females age 18 and over, there were 88.9 males.

=== 2015 American Community Survey ===
According to the 2015 American Community Survey, The median income for a household in the city was $37,431 and the median income for a family was $38,542. Males had a median income of $27,763 versus $16,809 for females. The per capita income for the city was $19,609. About 25.8% of families and 31.5% of the population were below the poverty line, including 53.3% of those under age 18 and 9.7% of those age 65 or over.

== Government and infrastructure ==
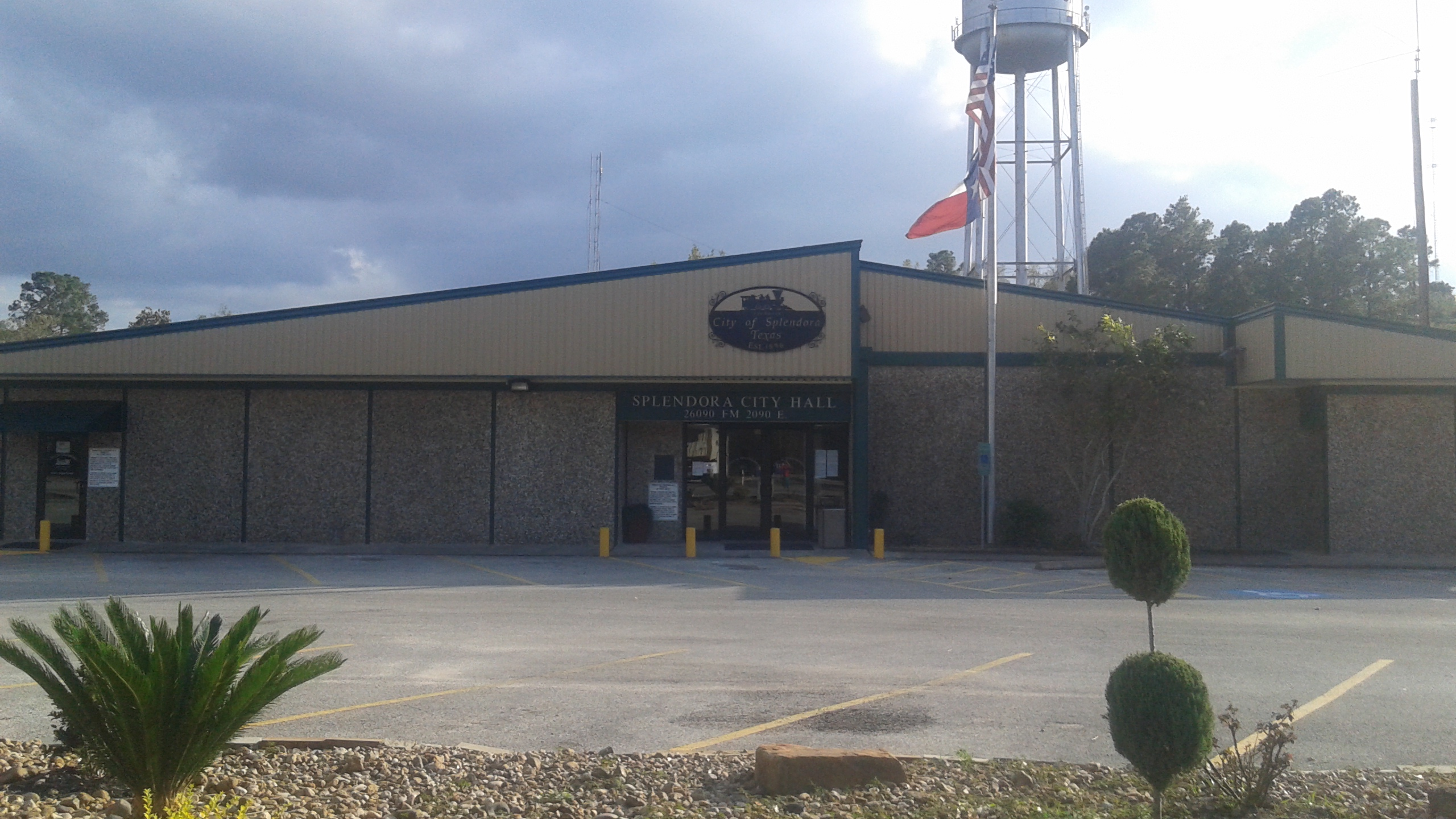
City Hall

Splendora is governed locally by a City Council consisting of a mayor and 5 council members. As of June 2022, the mayor is Dorothy Welch. Council members are William Ramey, Evelyn Myers, Mike Clark, Sharon Ipes, and William Usher.

In the Texas State Senate, Splendora is part of District 4, the seat is currently vacant pending a special election in May 2026. In the Texas House of Representatives, Splendora is part of District 18, represented by Republican Janice Holt.

In the United States Senate, Republicans John Cornyn and Ted Cruz represent the entire state of Texas. In the United States House of Representatives, Splendora is part of District 2, represented by Republican Dan Crenshaw.

The United States Postal Service Splendora Post Office is located at 26130 Farm to Market Road 2090 East.

== Education ==
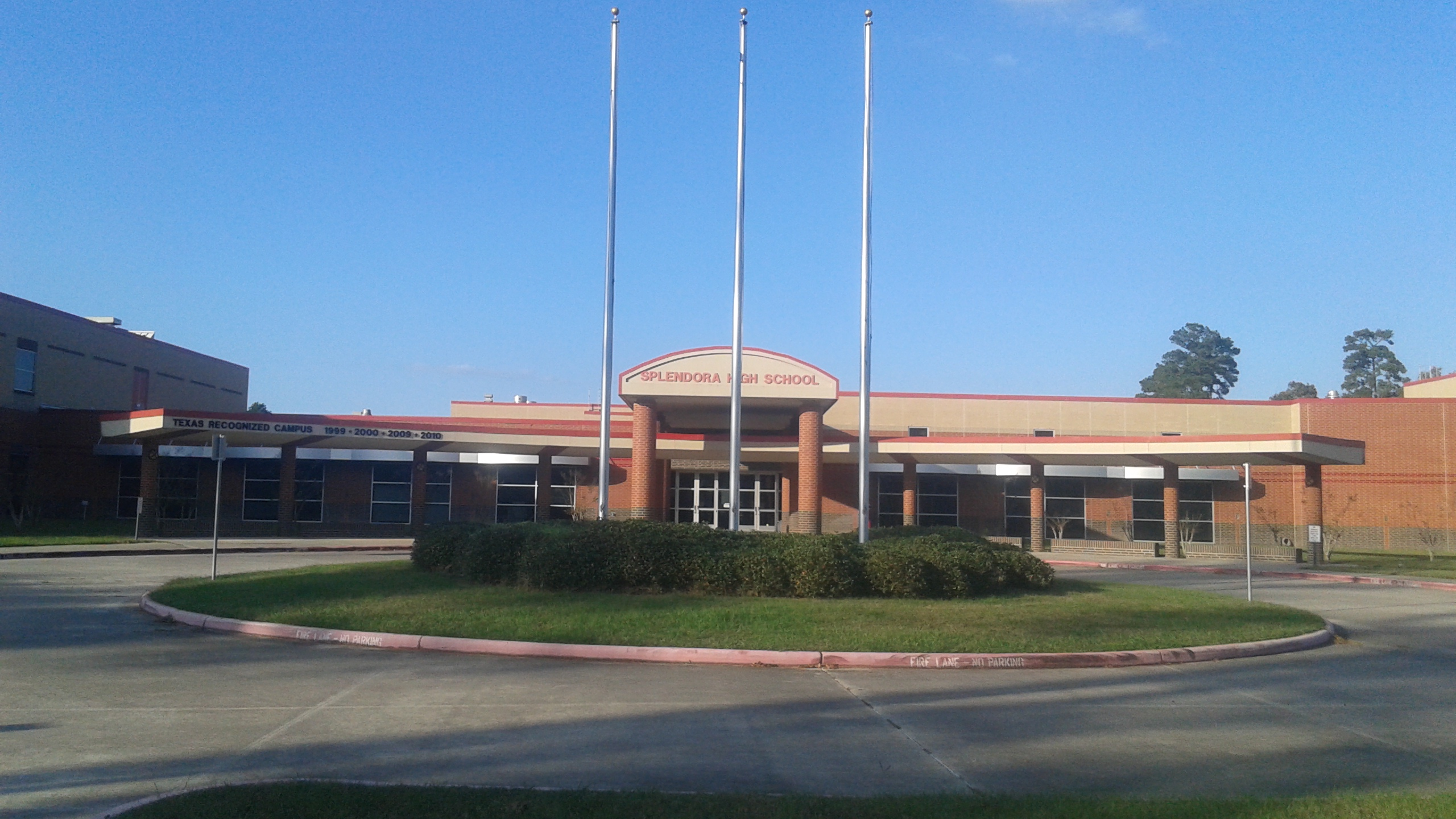
Splendora High School, Splendora ISD.

Children who live in Splendora attend schools within the Splendora Independent School District.

The Texas Legislature designated Splendora ISD (and therefore Splendora) as part of Lone Star College (originally the North Harris Montgomery Community College District). The territory in Splendora ISD joined the community college district in 1996.

== Notable people ==
- Robbie Middleton, burn survivor and crime victim
- Brian Robison, National Football League player
- James Surls, Modernist artist
- Mark Foreman, Orthopaedic surgeon, former program director, Army veteran with purple heart
