= Jack Middleton =

Jack Middleton may refer to:

- Jack Middleton (swimmer) (1917–2010), British Olympic swimmer
- Jack Middleton (politician), Scottish National Party politician
