= Jimmy Middleton (footballer) =

Scottish footballer

Personal information
- Date of birth: 25 April 1922
- Place of birth: Blackridge, Scotland
- Date of death: 4 October 1997 (aged 75)
- Place of death: Bathgate, Scotland
- Position: Wing half

Senior career*
Years	Team	Apps	(Gls)
1946–1949	Third Lanark	15	(1)
1946–1950	Bradford City	8	(0)
- East Stirlingshire
Total		23	(1)
- * Club domestic league appearances and goals

James Middleton (25 April 1922 – 4 October 1997) was a Scottish professional footballer, who played as a wing half.

== Career ==
Middleton was born in Blackridge and joined Bradford City from Third Lanark in May 1949. He made 8 league appearances for the club. He was released by the club in 1950, and later played for East Stirlingshire. He also made 38 Mossley appearances scoring 7 goals over the course of three seasons in the early 1950s.

== Sources ==
- Frost, Terry (1988). Bradford City A Complete Record 1903-1988. Breedon Books Sport. ISBN 0-907969-38-0.
