= John Middleton (rugby union) =

England international rugby union player

- Full name: John Alan Middleton
- Born: 11 January 1894 Dublin, Ireland
- Died: 30 April 1974 (aged 80) Hampshire, England

Rugby union career
- Position: Fullback
International career
Years	Team	Apps	(Points)
1922	England	1	(0)

John Alan Middleton (11 January 1894 – 30 April 1974) was an English international rugby union player.

An officer in the Royal Army Service Corps, Middleton played in services rugby for the Army, with his strong performance in a 1922 match against the Navy earning him an England call up. He filled the fullback position vacated by Reg Pickles for the 1922 Five Nations match against Scotland at Twickenham, which they won 11–5 to retain the Calcutta Cup.

== See also ==
- List of England national rugby union players
