= Murder of Robbie Middleton =

1998 crime in Texas, United States

Robert Ray Middleton (June 28, 1990 – April 29, 2011) was an American boy from Splendora, Texas, who on his eighth birthday in 1998 was tied to a tree, doused in gasoline, and set on fire. He suffered third-degree burns to 99% of his body and endured 150 operations, before dying at age 20 from a skin cancer that doctors attributed to his original injuries.

Just prior to his death, Robbie, the son of Bobby and Colleen Middleton, left a 27-minute video testimony on his deathbed naming the perpetrator who he believed had torched him as Don Wilburn Collins (born 1985), at the time a 13-year-old neighbor of the Middletons. Collins had allegedly raped Middleton in the same location of the torching just two weeks earlier and Collins' attempt to murder Middleton was to ensure that Middleton would never reveal the secret. Though Collins was detained in connection with the assault, he was later released because of insufficient evidence.

In 2001, Collins, age 16 at the time, had been jailed for sexually assaulting another eight-year-old boy and served time in jail. He also served time for failing to register as a sex offender and was released from prison on September 5, 2011.

In 2011, Middleton died of a rare form of cancer which was linked to the more than 150 surgeries and skin grafts which he received over his lifetime. A coroner ruled Middleton's death a homicide, and Collins was tried for the crime. On February 9, 2015, a jury convicted Collins of murder in the death of Robbie Middleton. Prosecutors say that Collins could serve up to 40 years in prison, but Collins' defense attorneys pledged to appeal the conviction. An appeal was lodged on the basis that the trial court's decision to try Collins as an adult for a crime he committed as a juvenile was an ex post facto violation of his rights. This appeal was rejected on March 29, 2017.

In December 2011, the Middleton family was granted $150 billion in compensation by the jury. This was a symbolic verdict requested by the family's lawyer, becoming the biggest compensation ever awarded by a U.S. civil jury (more than the Florida tobacco verdict from 2000 of $145 billion, which was overturned). Although they never expected to receive any of the money, Middleton's mother considered it a successful statement.
