= Marine 1 (Savannah fireboat) =

Marine One is a $1.5 million fireboat, retired as a cost saving measure, by Savannah, Georgia, in November, 2018.

Savannah acquired the boat in 2014, with $1.2 million of its cost paid for through a FEMA Port Security Grant. Like all fireboats paid for through FEMA grants, the fireboat is equipped to work during disasters where it has to cope with dangerous chemical spills, or when the air is contaminated with nuclear, chemical or germ warfare agents.

== Operational history ==
The fireboat rescued dozens of passengers when a local ferry dock collapsed.

== Retirement debate ==
Fire Chief Charles G. Middleton, who played a key role in the Fire Department's acquisition of the fireboat, announced his retirement on October 31, 2018.

The city closed down its central fire-station, where Marine One was moored, together with Engine 16, telling local businesses and residents that they would receive adequate firefighting services from nearby fire stations.

Savannah Alderman Julian Miller justified the retirement by asserting the boat cost $500,000 to operate, and had never been employed fighting fires, and that smaller boats available to the fire department could be used to perform marine rescues.

Kenneth Slatkovsky, a Savannah official, said the fireboat will remain moored at the closed station, and will be under a minimum operational maintenance schedule, so it would be available, if needed, after the firefighters trained to use her were called from their current assignments. Elements of the United States Coast Guard would be called upon for firefighting and marine rescue services, as would commercial tugboats.
