= Arthur Middleton (footballer) =

Australian rules footballer

Personal information
- Full name: Arthur William Middleton
- Born: 7 June 1876; Geelong
- Died: 17 May 1945 (aged 68); Mosman

Playing career^{1}
Years	Club	Games (Goals)
1897	St Kilda	1 (0)
1900	Fitzroy	3 (1)
Total		4 (1)
- ^{1} Playing statistics correct to the end of 1900.

Arthur William Middleton (7 June 1876 – 17 May 1945) was an Australian rules footballer who played with St Kilda and Fitzroy.

== Sources ==
- Holmesby, Russell & Main, Jim (2007). The Encyclopedia of AFL Footballers. 7th ed. Melbourne: Bas Publishing.
- Arthur Middleton's playing statistics from AFL Tables
- Arthur Middleton at AustralianFootball.com
