= Myddelton =

Myddelton is a surname, a variant of Middleton associated with Wales. Notable people with the surname include:

- Sir Richard Myddelton, 3rd Baronet (1655–1716), Welsh politician who sat in the House of Commons from 1685 to 1705
- Sir Thomas Myddelton, 1st Baronet (1624–1663), Welsh politician who sat in the House of Commons variously between 1646 and 1663
- Sir Thomas Myddelton, 2nd Baronet (1651–1684), Welsh politician who sat in the House of Commons between 1679 and 1681
- Robert Myddelton Biddulph (1761–1814), later Myddelton Biddulph (1761–1814), British Member of Parliament
- Robert Myddelton Biddulph (1805–1872) (1805–1872), British landowner and Member of Parliament for the Liberal Party
- Thomas Myddelton Biddulph (1809–1878), officer in the British Army and courtier
- Sir Humfrey Myddelton Gale KBE, CB, CVO, MC (1890–1971), officer in the British Army who served in the First and Second World War
- Hugh Myddelton, 1st Baronet (1560–1631), Welsh clothmaker, entrepreneur, mine-owner, goldsmith, banker and self-taught engineer
- Ririd Myddelton, MVO DL JP (1902–1988), country gentleman and one-time member of the Royal Household of the Sovereign of the United Kingdom
- Steve Myddelton (born 1986), professional Canadian football offensive lineman
- Thomas Myddelton (Lord Mayor of London) (1550–1631), the fourth son of Richard Myddelton, Governor of Denbigh, and Jane Dryhurst
- Thomas Myddelton (younger) (1586–1666), Welsh politician and Parliamentary general

== See also ==
- Myddelton baronets, of Chirke in the County of Denbigh, was a title in the Baronetage of England
