= List of cities and towns in Greater Houston =

This is a complete list of all incorporated cities, towns, and villages and CDPs within the Houston–Pasadena–The Woodlands metropolitan area defined by the U.S. Census as of April 2010.

== Cities with more than 2,000,000 inhabitants ==
- Houston

== Communities with 100,000 to 1,999,999 inhabitants ==
=== Cities and Areas with 100,000 to 1,999,999 inhabitants ===
- League City
- Pasadena
- Pearland
- Sugar Land
- Conroe
- Greater Katy

=== Census-Designated Places with 100,000 to 1,999,999 inhabitants ===
- The Woodlands
- Cypress

== Communities with 25,000 to 99,999 inhabitants ==
=== Cities with 25,000 to 99,999 inhabitants ===
- Baytown
- Deer Park
- Friendswood
- Galveston
- Lake Jackson
- La Porte
- Missouri City
- Rosenberg
- Texas City

=== Census-Designated Places with 25,000 to 99,999 inhabitants ===
- Atascocita
- Channelview
- Mission Bend
- Porter
- Spring

== Communities with 10,000 to 24,999 inhabitants ==
=== Cities with 10,000 to 24,999 inhabitants ===
- Alvin
- Angleton
- Bellaire
- Clute
- Dickinson
- Freeport
- Fulshear
- Galena Park
- Humble
- Jacinto City
- Katy
- La Marque
- Richmond
- Santa Fe
- Seabrook
- South Houston
- Stafford
- Tomball
- Webster
- West University Place

=== Census-Designated Places with 10,000 to 24,999 inhabitants ===
- Aldine
- Cinco Ranch
- Cloverleaf
- Four Corners
- Fresno
- Greatwood
- New Caney
- New Territory
- Pecan Grove
- Sienna Plantation

== Communities with fewer than 10,000 inhabitants ==
=== Cities with fewer than 10,000 inhabitants ===
- Ames
- Anahuac
- Arcola
- Bayou Vista
- Beach City
- Beasley
- Bellville
- Brazoria
- Brazos Country
- Brookshire
- Brookside Village
- Bunker Hill Village
- Clear Lake Shores
- Cleveland
- Cove
- Cut and Shoot
- Daisetta
- Danbury
- Dayton
- Dayton Lakes
- Devers
- El Lago
- Hardin
- Hempstead
- Hedwig Village
- Hilshire Village
- Hitchcock
- Hunters Creek Village
- Industry
- Iowa Colony
- Jamaica Beach
- Jersey Village
- Kemah
- Kendleton
- Liberty
- Liverpool
- Magnolia
- Manvel
- Meadows Place
- Mont Belvieu
- Montgomery
- Morgan's Point
- Nassau Bay
- Needville
- North Cleveland
- Oak Ridge North
- Old River-Winfree
- Orchard
- Oyster Creek
- Panorama Village
- Pattison
- Patton Village
- Piney Point Village
- Plantersville
- Plum Grove
- Prairie View
- Richwood
- Sealy
- Shenandoah
- Shoreacres
- Simonton
- Southside Place
- Splendora
- Spring Valley Village
- Surfside Beach
- Sweeny
- Taylor Lake Village
- Waller
- Wallis
- West Columbia
- Willis
- Woodbranch

=== Towns with fewer than 10,000 inhabitants ===
- Holiday Lakes
- Kenefick
- Pine Island
- Quintana
- Roman Forest
- San Felipe
- Stagecoach
- Thompsons
- Woodloch

=== Villages with fewer than 10,000 inhabitants ===
- Bailey's Prairie
- Bonney
- Fairchilds
- Hillcrest
- Jones Creek
- Pleak
- Tiki Island

=== Census-Designated Places with fewer than 10,000 inhabitants ===
- Bacliff
- Barrett
- Bolivar Peninsula
- Crosby
- Cumings
- Damon
- Fifth Street
- Highlands
- Pinehurst
- Porter Heights
- San Leon
- Sheldon
- Stowell
- Wild Peach Village
- Winnie
