= Texas's 2nd congressional district =

U.S. House district for Texas

Coordinates: 30°02′51″N 95°10′42″W

- Interactive map of district boundaries
- Representative: Dan Crenshaw; R–Atascocita
- Distribution: 98.1% urban; 1.9% rural
- Population (2025): 906,625
- Median household income: $104,142
- Ethnicity: 49.4% White; 30.3% Hispanic; 11.2% Black; 4.5% Asian; 3.8% Two or more races; 0.9% other
- Cook PVI: R+12

Texas's 2nd congressional district of the United States House of Representatives is in the southeastern portion of the state of Texas. It encompasses parts of northern and eastern Harris County and southern Montgomery County, Texas.

From 2002 to 2012, it stretched from Houston's northern suburbs through eastern Harris County, and across Southeast Texas to the Louisiana border. As of the 2000 census, the 2nd district represented 651,619 people. The district's configuration dates from the 2003 Texas redistricting, when most of the old 9th district was split among three neighboring districts. The four-term Democratic incumbent in the 9th district, Nick Lampson, was unseated by Republican Ted Poe, a longtime felony-court judge in Harris County. In November 2017, Poe announced that he would retire from Congress at the end of his current term, and did not seek re-election in 2018. Dan Crenshaw was elected on November 6, 2018, and is currently serving as congressman.

== 2012 redistricting ==
The 2012 redistricting process radically changed the district. Beaumont, which had been part of the 2nd and its predecessors for over a century, was removed along with all of Jefferson County. All of Liberty County was removed as well, putting the district entirely within Harris County. The district now includes Kingwood, Humble, and Atascocita in northeastern Harris County.

== Recent election results from statewide races ==
=== 2023–2027 boundaries ===
Year	Office	Results
2008	President	McCain 70% - 29%
2012	President	Romney 73% - 27%
2014	Senate	Cornyn 77% - 23%
2014	Governor	Abbott 74% - 26%
2016	President	Trump 63% - 32%
2018	Senate	Cruz 62% - 37%
2018	Governor	Abbott 66% - 32%
2018	Lt. Governor	Patrick 63% - 36%
2018	Attorney General	Paxton 62% - 36%
2018	Comptroller of Public Accounts	Hegar 65% - 33%
2020	President	Trump 61% - 38%
2020	Senate	Cornyn 62% - 35%
2022	Governor	Abbott 62% - 36%
2022	Lt. Governor	Patrick 61% - 36%
2022	Attorney General	Paxton 61% - 36%
2022	Comptroller of Public Accounts	Hegar 64% - 34%
2024	President	Trump 61% - 37%
2024	Senate	Cruz 58% - 39%

=== 2027–2033 boundaries ===
Year	Office	Results
2008	President	McCain 70% - 29%
2012	President	Romney 73% - 27%
2014	Senate	Cornyn 77% - 23%
2014	Governor	Abbott 74% - 26%
2016	President	Trump 63% - 32%
2018	Senate	Cruz 61% - 38%
2018	Governor	Abbott 66% - 33%
2018	Lt. Governor	Patrick 62% - 36%
2018	Attorney General	Paxton 61% - 37%
2018	Comptroller of Public Accounts	Hegar 64% - 33%
2020	President	Trump 60% - 39%
2020	Senate	Cornyn 62% - 36%
2022	Governor	Abbott 62% - 37%
2022	Lt. Governor	Patrick 61% - 37%
2022	Attorney General	Paxton 61% - 37%
2022	Comptroller of Public Accounts	Hegar 64% - 34%
2024	President	Trump 61% - 38%
2024	Senate	Cruz 58% - 40%
2026	Senate	Talarico 50% - 47%
2026	Governor	Abbott 50% - 48%

== Composition ==
For the 118th and successive Congresses (based on redistricting following the 2020 census), the district contains all or portions of the following counties and communities:

Harris County (11)

Atascocita (part; also 18th), Barrett, Baytown (part; also 36th), Channelview (part; also 29th and 36th), Crosby, Highlands, Houston (part; also 7th, 8th, 9th, 18th, 22nd, 29th, 36th, 38th; shared with Fort Bend and Montgomery counties), Humble (part; also 18th and 29th), Sheldon, Spring, The Woodlands (part; also 8th; shared with Montgomery County)

Montgomery County (14)

Cleveland, Conroe (part; also 8th), Deerwood, Grangerland (part; also 8th), Houston (part; also 7th, 8th, 9th, 18th, 22nd, 29th, 36th, 38th; shared with Fort Bend and Harris counties), Oak Ridge North, Patton Village, Porter Heights, Roman Forest, Shenandoah, Splendora, Woodbranch, The Woodlands (part; also 8th; shared with Harris County), Woodloch

== List of members representing the district ==
Representative	Party	Term	Cong ress	Electoral history	Counties represented
District established December 29, 1845
Vacant		December 29, 1845 – March 30, 1846	29th		1845–1849; Bexar, Milam, Robertson, Travis, Brazos, Montgomery, Washington, Bastrop, Gonzales, Fayette, Austin, Harris, Colorado, Fort Bend, Brazoria, Galveston, Goliad, Jackson, Victoria, Refugio, San Patricio
Timothy Pilsbury (Brazoria)	Democratic	March 30, 1846 – March 3, 1849	29th 30th	Elected in 1846. Re-elected November 2, 1846. Lost re-election.	1845–1849; Bexar, Milam, Robertson, Travis, Brazos, Montgomery, Washington, Bastrop, Gonzales, Fayette, Austin, Harris, Colorado, Fort Bend, Brazoria, Galveston, Goliad, Jackson, Victoria, Refugio, San Patricio
Volney E. Howard (San Antonio)	Democratic	March 4, 1849 – March 3, 1853	31st 32nd	Elected late August 6, 1849. Re-elected late August 4, 1851. Lost re-election.	1849–1859; El Paso, Presidio, Bexar, Mclennan, Navarro, Tarrant, Ellis, Bell, Freestone, Limestone, Falls, Travis, Gillespie, Leon, Robertson, Milam, Williamson, Hays, Comal, Bexar, Medina, Uvalde, Kinney, Burleson, Brazos, Grimes, Walker, Montgomery, Washington, Bastrop, Caldwell, Guadalupe, Harris, Austin, Galveston, Brazoria, Matagorda, Wharton, Colorado, Fayette, Gonzales, De Witt, Lavaca, Jackson, Calhoun, Victoria, Goliad, Refugio, San Patricio, Nueces, Webb, Starr, Cameron
Peter H. Bell (Austin)	Democratic	March 4, 1853 – March 3, 1857	33rd 34th	Elected late August 1, 1853. Re-elected late August 6, 1855. Lost re-election.	1849–1859; El Paso, Presidio, Bexar, Mclennan, Navarro, Tarrant, Ellis, Bell, Freestone, Limestone, Falls, Travis, Gillespie, Leon, Robertson, Milam, Williamson, Hays, Comal, Bexar, Medina, Uvalde, Kinney, Burleson, Brazos, Grimes, Walker, Montgomery, Washington, Bastrop, Caldwell, Guadalupe, Harris, Austin, Galveston, Brazoria, Matagorda, Wharton, Colorado, Fayette, Gonzales, De Witt, Lavaca, Jackson, Calhoun, Victoria, Goliad, Refugio, San Patricio, Nueces, Webb, Starr, Cameron
Guy M. Bryan (Brazoria)	Democratic	March 4, 1857 – March 3, 1859	35th	Elected late August 3, 1857. Retired.	1849–1859; El Paso, Presidio, Bexar, Mclennan, Navarro, Tarrant, Ellis, Bell, Freestone, Limestone, Falls, Travis, Gillespie, Leon, Robertson, Milam, Williamson, Hays, Comal, Bexar, Medina, Uvalde, Kinney, Burleson, Brazos, Grimes, Walker, Montgomery, Washington, Bastrop, Caldwell, Guadalupe, Harris, Austin, Galveston, Brazoria, Matagorda, Wharton, Colorado, Fayette, Gonzales, De Witt, Lavaca, Jackson, Calhoun, Victoria, Goliad, Refugio, San Patricio, Nueces, Webb, Starr, Cameron
Andrew J. Hamilton (Austin)	Independent Democratic	March 4, 1859 – March 3, 1861	36th	Elected late August 1, 1859. Retired.	1859–1861; Bexar, Milam, Robertson, Travis, Brazos, Montgomery, Washington, Bastrop, Gonzales, Fayette, Austin, Harris, Colorado, Fort Bend, Brazoria, Galveston, Goliad, Jackson, Victoria, Refugio, San Patricio
District inactive		March 3, 1861 – March 31, 1870	37th 38th 39th 40th 41st	Civil War and Reconstruction	
John C. Conner (Sherman)	Democratic	March 31, 1870 – March 3, 1873	41st 42nd	Elected upon readmission. Re-elected late October 6, 1871. Retired because of failing health.	1870–1875; Bexar, Milam, Robertson, Travis, Brazos, Montgomery, Washington, Bastrop, Gonzales, Fayette, Austin, Harris, Colorado, Fort Bend, Brazoria, Galveston, Goliad, Jackson, Victoria, Refugio, San Patricio
William P. McLean (Mount Pleasant)	Democratic	March 4, 1873 – March 3, 1875	43rd	Elected in 1872. Retired.	1870–1875; Bexar, Milam, Robertson, Travis, Brazos, Montgomery, Washington, Bastrop, Gonzales, Fayette, Austin, Harris, Colorado, Fort Bend, Brazoria, Galveston, Goliad, Jackson, Victoria, Refugio, San Patricio
David B. Culberson (Jefferson)	Democratic	March 4, 1875 – March 3, 1883	44th 45th 46th 47th	Elected in 1874. Re-elected in 1876. Re-elected in 1878. Re-elected in 1880. Redistricted to the 4th district.	1875–1881; Fannin, Lamar, Delta, Red River, Bowie, Hunt, Rains, Hopkins, Titus, Cass, Wood, Upshur, Marion, Van Zandt, Gregg, Harrison
David B. Culberson (Jefferson)	Democratic	March 4, 1875 – March 3, 1883	44th 45th 46th 47th	Elected in 1874. Re-elected in 1876. Re-elected in 1878. Re-elected in 1880. Redistricted to the 4th district.	1881–1893; Henderson, Anderson, Freestone, Cherokee, Robertson, Leon, Houston, Nacogdoches, San Augustine, Sabine
John H. Reagan (Palestine)	Democratic	March 4, 1883 – March 3, 1887	48th 49th	Redistricted from the 1st district. Elected in 1882. Re-elected in 1884. Re-elected in 1886, but resigned when elected U.S. senator.	1881–1893; Henderson, Anderson, Freestone, Cherokee, Robertson, Leon, Houston, Nacogdoches, San Augustine, Sabine
Vacant		March 4, 1887 – November 4, 1887	50th		1881–1893; Henderson, Anderson, Freestone, Cherokee, Robertson, Leon, Houston, Nacogdoches, San Augustine, Sabine
William H. Martin (Athens)	Democratic	November 4, 1887 – March 3, 1891	50th 51st	Elected to finish Reagan's term. Re-elected in 1888. [data missing]	1881–1893; Henderson, Anderson, Freestone, Cherokee, Robertson, Leon, Houston, Nacogdoches, San Augustine, Sabine
John Benjamin Long (Rusk)	Democratic	March 4, 1891 – March 3, 1893	52nd	Elected in 1890. [data missing]	1881–1893; Henderson, Anderson, Freestone, Cherokee, Robertson, Leon, Houston, Nacogdoches, San Augustine, Sabine
Samuel B. Cooper (Beaumont)	Democratic	March 4, 1893 – March 3, 1905	53rd 54th 55th 56th 57th 58th	Elected in 1892. Re-elected in 1894. Re-elected in 1896. Re-elected in 1898. Re-elected in 1900. Re-elected in 1902. Lost re-election.	1893–1905; Harrison, Panola, Shelby, Anderson, Cherokee, Nacogdoches, Houston, San Augustine, Sabine, Polk, Tyler, Jasper, Newton, San Jacinto, Liberty, Hardin, Orange, Jefferson
Moses L. Broocks (San Augustine)	Democratic	March 4, 1905 – March 3, 1907	59th	Elected in 1904. [data missing]	1905–1907 [data missing]
Samuel B. Cooper (Beaumont)	Democratic	March 4, 1907 – March 3, 1909	60th	Elected in 1906. Lost re-election.	1907–1909 [data missing]
Martin Dies Sr. (Beaumont)	Democratic	March 4, 1909 – March 3, 1919	61st 62nd 63rd 64th 65th	Elected in 1908. Re-elected in 1910. Re-elected in 1912. Re-elected in 1914. Re-elected in 1916. [data missing]	1909–1919 [data missing]
John C. Box (Jacksonville)	Democratic	March 4, 1919 – March 3, 1931	66th 67th 68th 69th 70th 71st	Elected in 1918. Re-elected in 1920. Re-elected in 1922. Re-elected in 1924. Re-elected in 1926. Re-elected in 1928. [data missing]	1919–1931 [data missing]
Martin Dies Jr. (Orange)	Democratic	March 4, 1931 – January 3, 1945	72nd 73rd 74th 75th 76th 77th 78th	Elected in 1930. Re-elected in 1932. Re-elected in 1934. Re-elected in 1936. Re-elected in 1938. Re-elected in 1940. Re-elected in 1942. Retired.	1931–1945 [data missing]
Jesse M. Combs (Beaumont)	Democratic	January 3, 1945 – January 3, 1953	79th 80th 81st 82nd	Elected in 1944. Re-elected in 1946. Re-elected in 1948. Re-elected in 1950. [data missing]	1945–1953 [data missing]
Jack Brooks (Beaumont)	Democratic	January 3, 1953 – January 3, 1967	83rd 84th 85th 86th 87th 88th 89th	Elected in 1952. Re-elected in 1954. Re-elected in 1956. Re-elected in 1958. Re-elected in 1960. Re-elected in 1962. Re-elected in 1964. Redistricted to the 9th district.	1953–1967 [data missing]
John Dowdy (Athens)	Democratic	January 3, 1967 – January 3, 1973	90th 91st 92nd	Redistricted from the 7th district and re-elected in 1966. Re-elected in 1968. Re-elected in 1970. Retired.	1967–1973 [data missing]
Charlie Wilson (Lufkin)	Democratic	January 3, 1973 – January 3, 1997	93rd 94th 95th 96th 97th 98th 99th 100th 101st 102nd 103rd 104th	Elected in 1972. Re-elected in 1974. Re-elected in 1976. Re-elected in 1978. Re-elected in 1980. Re-elected in 1982. Re-elected in 1984. Re-elected in 1986. Re-elected in 1986. Re-elected in 1988. Re-elected in 1990. Re-elected in 1992. Re-elected in 1994. Retired.	1973–1997 [data missing]
Jim Turner (Crockett)	Democratic	January 3, 1997 – January 3, 2005	105th 106th 107th 108th	Elected in 1996. Re-elected in 1998. Re-elected in 2000. Re-elected in 2002. Redistricted to the 8th district and retired.	1997–2005 [data missing]
Ted Poe (Atascocita)	Republican	January 3, 2005 – January 3, 2019	109th 110th 111th 112th 113th 114th 115th	Elected in 2004. Re-elected in 2006. Re-elected in 2008. Re-elected in 2010. Re-elected in 2012. Re-elected in 2014. Re-elected in 2016. Retired.	
Ted Poe (Atascocita)	Republican	January 3, 2005 – January 3, 2019	109th 110th 111th 112th 113th 114th 115th	Elected in 2004. Re-elected in 2006. Re-elected in 2008. Re-elected in 2010. Re-elected in 2012. Re-elected in 2014. Re-elected in 2016. Retired.	2005–2013
Ted Poe (Atascocita)	Republican	January 3, 2005 – January 3, 2019	109th 110th 111th 112th 113th 114th 115th	Elected in 2004. Re-elected in 2006. Re-elected in 2008. Re-elected in 2010. Re-elected in 2012. Re-elected in 2014. Re-elected in 2016. Retired.	2013–2023 Harris (part)
Dan Crenshaw (Atascocita)	Republican	January 3, 2019 – present	116th 117th 118th 119th	Elected in 2018. Re-elected in 2020. Re-elected in 2022. Re-elected in 2024. Lost renomination.	2013–2023 Harris (part)
Dan Crenshaw (Atascocita)	Republican	January 3, 2019 – present	116th 117th 118th 119th	Elected in 2018. Re-elected in 2020. Re-elected in 2022. Re-elected in 2024. Lost renomination.	2023–2027 Harris (part), Montgomery (part)
Steve Toth (Conroe)	Republican	Assuming office on January 3, 2027		Elected in 2026.	2023–2027 Harris (part), Montgomery (part)

== Election results ==
=== 2004 ===
US House election, 2004: Texas District 2
Party	Candidate	Votes	%	±%
Republican	Ted Poe	139,951	55.5	+17.3
Democratic	Nick Lampson	108,156	42.9	−17.9
Libertarian	Sandra Saulsbury	3,931	1.6	+0.6
Majority		31,795	12.6	
Turnout		252,038		
Republican gain from Democratic		Swing	+17.6	

=== 2006 ===
US House election, 2006: Texas District 2
Party	Candidate	Votes	%	±%
Republican	Ted Poe (incumbent)	90,332	65.6	+10.1
Democratic	Gary Binderim	45,027	32.7	−10.2
Libertarian	Justo Perez	2,294	1.7	+0.1
Majority		45,305	32.9	
Turnout		137,653		
Republican hold		Swing	+20.3	

=== 2010 ===
US House election, 2010: Texas District 2
Party	Candidate	Votes	%
Republican	Ted Poe (incumbent)	130,020	88.6
Libertarian	David W. Smith	16,711	11.4
Total votes		146,731	100
Republican hold			

=== 2012 ===
US House election, 2012: Texas District 2
Party	Candidate	Votes	%
Republican	Ted Poe (Incumbent)	159,664	64.8
Democratic	Jim Dougherty	80,512	32.9
Libertarian	Kenneth Duncan	4,140	1.9
Green	Mark A. Roberts	2,012	0.8
Total votes		246,328	100

=== 2014 ===
US House election, 2014: Texas District 2
Party	Candidate	Votes	%
Republican	Ted Poe (Incumbent)	101,936	68.0
Democratic	Niko Letsos	44,462	29.6
Libertarian	James B Veasaw	2,316	1.5
Green	Mark Roberts	1,312	0.9
Total votes		150,026	100
Republican hold			

=== 2016 ===
US House election, 2016: Texas District 2
Party	Candidate	Votes	%
Republican	Ted Poe (incumbent)	168,692	60.6
Democratic	Pat Bryan	100,231	36.0
Libertarian	James B. Veasaw	6,429	2.3
Green	Joshua Darr	2,884	1.1
Total votes		278,236	100
Republican hold			

=== 2018 ===
US House election, 2018: Texas District 2
Party	Candidate	Votes	%
Republican	Dan Crenshaw	139,188	52.8
Democratic	Todd Litton	119,992	45.6
Libertarian	Patrick Gunnels	2,373	0.9
Independent	Scott Cubbler	1,839	0.7
Total votes		263,392	100
Republican hold			

=== 2020 ===
2020 United States House of Representatives elections in Texas: Texas District 2
Party	Candidate	Votes	%	±%
Republican	Dan Crenshaw (incumbent)	197,300	56.1	+3.3
Democratic	Sima Ladjevardian	148,727	42.3	−3.3
Libertarian	Elliott Robert Scheirman	5,582	1.6	+0.7
Total votes		351,609	100	
Republican hold		Swing		

=== 2022 ===
2022 United States House of Representatives elections in Texas: Texas District 2
Party	Candidate	Votes	%	±%
Republican	Dan Crenshaw (incumbent)	151,791	65.9	+9.8
Democratic	Robin Fulford	78,496	34.0	−8.3
Total votes		230,287	100	
Republican hold		Swing		

=== 2024 ===
2024 United States House of Representatives elections in Texas: Texas District 2
Party	Candidate	Votes	%	±%
Republican	Dan Crenshaw (incumbent)	214,631	65.66	
Democratic	Peter Filler	112,252	34.34	
Total votes		326,883	100.00	
Republican hold				

=== 2026 ===
Republican primary election results, March 3, 2026
Party	Candidate	Votes	%
Republican	Steve Toth	36,760	55.8
Republican	Dan Crenshaw (incumbent)	26,764	40.7
Republican	Martin Etwop	1,211	1.8
Republican	Nicholas Lee Plumb	1,104	1.7
Total votes		65,839	100

2026 United States House of Representatives elections in Texas: Texas District 2
Party	Candidate	Votes	%	±%
Republican	Steve Toth	144,748	51.0	
Democratic	Shaun Finnie	139,167	49.0	
Total votes		283,915	100%	

== See also ==
- List of United States congressional districts
