= Porter Middle School =

Porter Middle School may refer to a number of middle schools:

- Porter Middle School, Missoula, Montana, part of Missoula Elementary School District
- George K. Porter Middle School, Granada Hills, California, part of Los Angeles Unified School District
- Lewiston Porter Middle School, part of Lewiston-Porter Central School District

== See also ==
- Porter High School

George K Porter has the Trojan as a mascot.
