= Lone Star College–Kingwood =

Community college in Houston, Texas

Lone Star College
- Established: 1984; 42 years ago
- Parent institution: Lone Star College System
- President: Melissa N. Gonzalez
- Location: Kingwood, Houston, Texas, United States; 30.05464°N 95.25942°W
- Website: LSC-Kingwood

Lone Star College-Kingwood, until 2007 Kingwood College (KC), is a community college in the Kingwood section of Houston, Texas, United States.

Lone Star College-Kingwood is a part of the Lone Star College System. The college offers many academic courses, specialized workforce programs, and career and technical education programs in addition to the standard two-year degrees. Offerings include teaching, nursing, dental hygiene, respiratory care, occupational therapy, and computing programs. The campus currently has nine buildings, and the 10th, Health Professions Center, will open in spring 2022.

== History ==
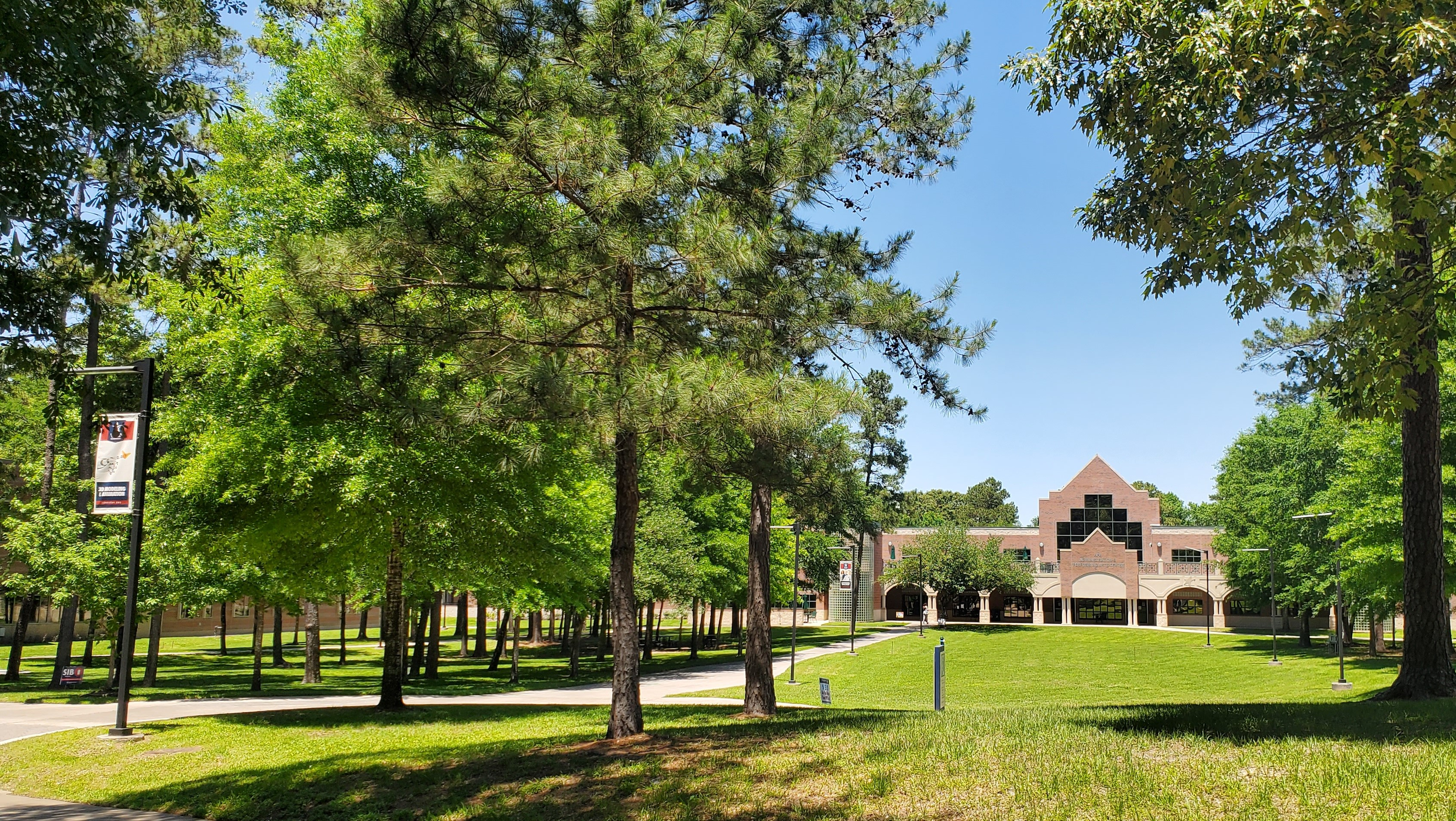
A building on LSC-Kingwood campus.

The college was established in 1984 with 1,168 students.

In 2000 Mark Schone of Spin wrote that in the Kingwood area LSC-Kingwood is known as a "13th grade" since so many people from the area go to the school there.

The name was changed in 2007 to emphasize the presence of the college district.

Six buildings of the college were affected by flooding from Hurricane Harvey in 2017, with 95% of the library's books destroyed.

== Academics ==
LSC-Kingwood and its satellite centers serve more than 11,000 students each semester. Students can choose a mode of instruction (online, in-person, and hybrid) that works best with their schedules. In 2011, the college opened a satellite center, LSC-Atascocita Center, on West Lake Houston Parkway. Students can take general college courses toward an associate degree or earn transfer credits to a four-year university. In 2018, the second satellite facility, the LSC-Process Technology Center, opened in Generation Park. In addition to core classes, students can earn an associate degree in Process Technology or Instrumentation Technology. Please note that the advising department stops accepting walk-in students 30 minutes before closing.

Beyond standard academic classes, LSC-Kingwood partners with area school districts to offer dual credit courses and Early College High School programs. LSC-Kingwood offers courses at Infinity Early College High School, partnering with New Caney ISD. Before COVID-19, the educational institution offered many programs for adults age 50 and older through the Academy for Lifelong Learning (ALL) and summer camps for children ages 7-18 through Discovery College. In addition, the college hosted several community events, i.e., drama productions, concerts, recitals, art shows, and invited all stakeholders to take advantage of its resources, such as the fitness center.

== See also ==
- Lone Star College System
