= Zion Childress =

American football player (born 2002)

No. 41 – Los Angeles Chargers
- Position: Cornerback
- Roster status: Practice squad

Personal information
- Born: January 21, 2002 (age 24); Houston, Texas, U.S.
- Listed height: 5 ft 11 in (1.80 m)
- Listed weight: 203 lb (92 kg)

Career information
- High school: New Caney (New Caney, Texas)
- College: Texas State (2020–2021); Kentucky (2022–2024)
- NFL draft: 2025: undrafted

Career history
- Dallas Cowboys (2025); Houston Texans (2025); Dallas Cowboys (2025); Carolina Panthers (2026)*; Los Angeles Chargers (2026–present)*
- * Offseason or practice squad member only

Career NFL statistics as of Week 8, 2026
- Total tackles: 2
- Stats at Pro Football Reference

Zion Childress (born January 21, 2002) is an American professional football cornerback for the Los Angeles Chargers of the National Football League (NFL). He played college football for the Texas State Bobcats and Kentucky Wildcats.

== Early life ==
Childress attended New Caney High School located in New Caney, Texas. Coming out of high school, he committed to play college football for the Texas State Bobcats.

== College career ==
=== Texas State ===
During his freshman season in 2020, Childress played in all 12 games, making six starts, where he recorded 61 tackles with one going for a loss, four pass deflections, and a fumble recovery. In week one of the 2021 season, he recorded seven tackles and a forced fumble versus Baylor. Childress finished the 2021 season, notching 74 tackles, five pass deflections, an interception, and two forced fumbles. After the conclusion of the 2021 season, he decided to enter his name into the NCAA transfer portal.

=== Kentucky ===
Childress transferred to play for the Kentucky Wildcats. During the 2022 season, he recorded 34 tackles, a sack, and three pass deflections in 13 games. In the 2023 season, Childress was named a team captain, starting in all 13 games, where he tallied 59 tackles with two being for a loss, a sack, three pass deflections, and a fumble recovery. During the 2024 season, he totaled 55 tackles with six being for a loss, a sack, two pass deflections, and a forced fumble.

== Professional career ==
Pre-draft measurables
Height	Weight	Arm length	Hand span	Wingspan	20-yard shuttle	Three-cone drill	Bench press
5 ft 11 1/4 in (1.81 m)	199 lb (90 kg)	31 1/2 in (0.80 m)	8 3/4 in (0.22 m)	6 ft 3 1/4 in (1.91 m)	4.35 s	7.08 s	14 reps
All values from Pro Day

=== Dallas Cowboys ===
After not being selected in the 2025 NFL draft, Childress signed with the Dallas Cowboys as an undrafted free agent. He was waived on August 27, 2025 and re-signed to the practice squad. Childress made two appearances for the Cowboys, recording one tackle.

=== Houston Texans ===
On September 24, 2025, the Houston Texans signed Childress to their 53-man roster off the Cowboys practice squad. He was waived on October 20.

=== Dallas Cowboys (second stint) ===
On October 22, 2025, Childress was signed to the Dallas Cowboys' practice squad. He signed a reserve/future contract with Dallas on January 6, 2026.

On August 30, 2026, Childress was waived by the Cowboys as a part of final roster cuts.

=== Carolina Panthers ===
On September 1, 2026, Childress was signed to the Carolina Panthers' practice squad. On November 6, he was released.

=== Los Angeles Chargers ===
On November 11, 2026, Childress signed with the Los Angeles Chargers practice squad.
