= Woodbranch, Texas =

Woodbranch Village, Texas
- City
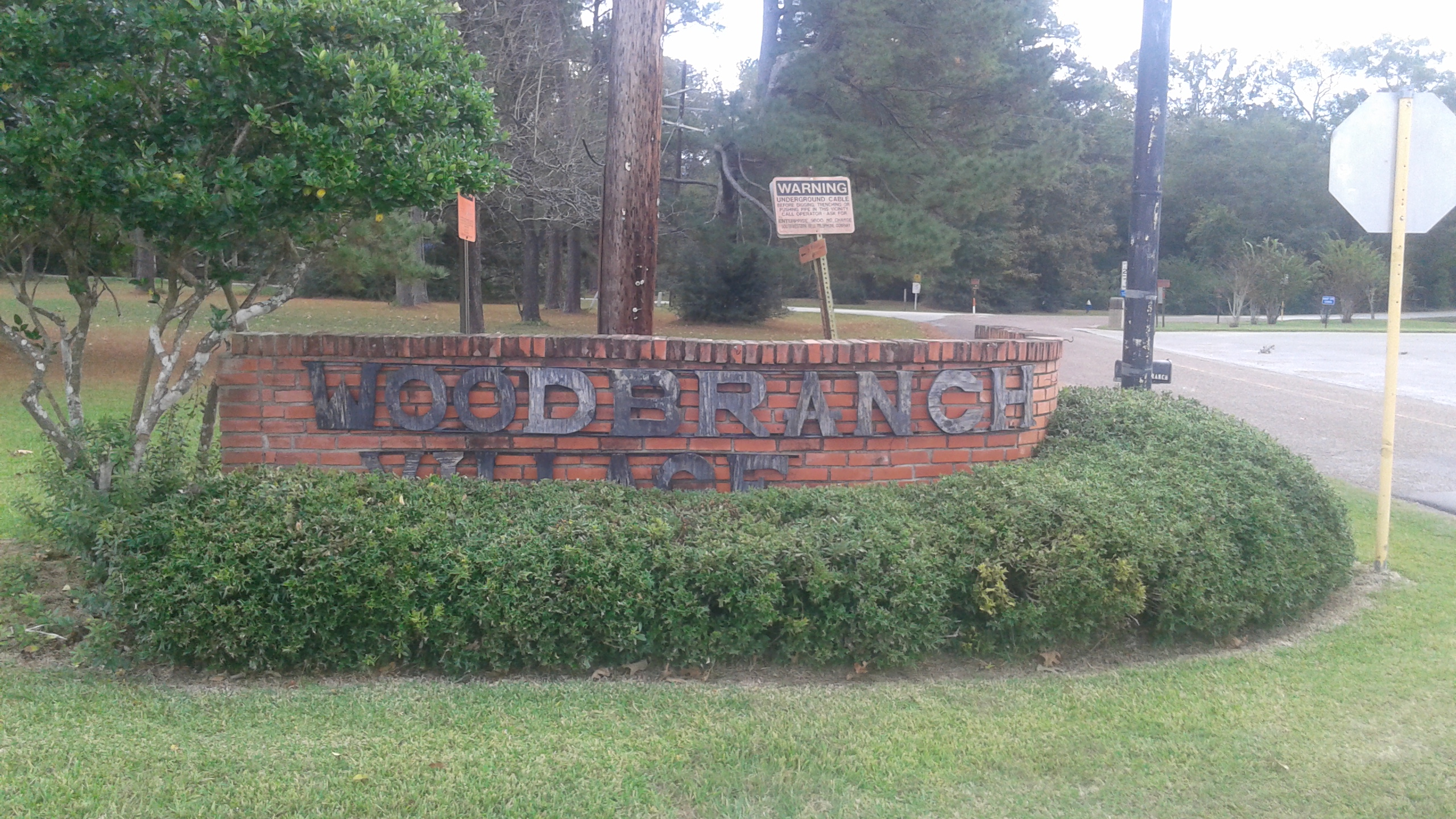
- Welcome sign at the entrance to Woodbranch Village

- Location of Woodbranch, Texas

- Location in Texas Location in the United States
- Coordinates: 30°11′4″N 95°11′22″W
- Country: United States
- State: Texas
- Counties: Montgomery
- Incorporated: 1967

Government
  - Type: Type A general-law municipality
  - Mayor: Mike Tyson
  - City Council: Scottie Garner; Stacey Shipley; Trish Marie Cranny; Nancy Mulhern; James Mulkey

Area
  - Total: 2.01 sq mi (5.20 km^{2})
  - Land: 2.01 sq mi (5.20 km^{2})
  - Water: 0 sq mi (0.00 km^{2})
- Elevation: 95 ft (29 m)

Population (2020)
  - Total: 1,330
  - Density: 717.5/sq mi (277.02/km^{2})
- Time zone: UTC-6 (Central (CST))
  - Summer (DST): UTC-5 (CDT)
- ZIP code: 77357
- Area code: 281
- FIPS code: 48-80044
- GNIS feature ID: 1388596
- Website: woodbranchtx.us

Woodbranch Village, also known simply as Woodbranch, is a city in Montgomery County, Texas, United States. The population was 1,330 at the 2020 census.

== Geography ==
Woodbranch is located at 30°11′4″N 95°11′22″W (30.184410, –95.189544).

According to the United States Census Bureau, the city has a total area of 2.0 square miles (5.2 km^{2}), all land.

== History ==
In the 1960s, developers built a subdivision, naming it "Woodbranch" because of the abundance of trees in the area. Residents decided to incorporate the city in 1967 as "Woodbranch Village."

== Demographics ==
Historical population
Census	Pop.	Note	%±
1970	378		—
1980	720		90.5%
1990	1,312		82.2%
2000	1,305		−0.5%
2010	1,282		−1.8%
2020	1,330		3.7%
U.S. Decennial Census

=== 2020 census ===
As of the 2020 census, there were 1,330 people, 468 households, and 409 families residing in Woodbranch. The median age was 42.8 years, with 22.0% of residents under the age of 18 and 18.5% aged 65 or older. For every 100 females there were 96.2 males, and for every 100 females age 18 and over there were 95.3 males age 18 and over.

100.0% of residents lived in urban areas, while 0.0% lived in rural areas.

There were 468 households in Woodbranch, of which 37.2% had children under the age of 18 living in them. Of all households, 62.6% were married-couple households, 12.8% were households with a male householder and no spouse or partner present, and 20.7% were households with a female householder and no spouse or partner present. About 16.9% of all households were made up of individuals and 12.0% had someone living alone who was 65 years of age or older.

There were 528 housing units, of which 11.4% were vacant. The homeowner vacancy rate was 2.0% and the rental vacancy rate was 21.2%.

Racial composition as of the 2020 census (Note: Note: the US Census treats Hispanic/Latino as an ethnic category. This table excludes Latinos from the racial categories and assigns them to a separate category. Hispanics/Latinos can be of any race.)
Race	Number	Percent
White	1,045	78.6%
Black or African American	22	1.7%
American Indian and Alaska Native	17	1.3%
Asian	10	0.8%
Native Hawaiian and Other Pacific Islander	0	0.0%
Some other race	103	7.7%
Two or more races	133	10.0%
Hispanic or Latino (of any race)	272	20.5%

=== 2010 census ===
As of the 2010 United States census, there were 1,282 people, 477 households, and 380 families residing in the city. The racial makeup of the city was 92.7% White, 1.7% African American, 0.5% Native American, 0.4% Asian, 1.3% from other races, and 3.3% from two or more races. Hispanic or Latino of any race were 8.0% of the population.

There were 477 households, out of which 25.6% had children under the age of 18 living with them, 67.9% were married couples living together, 8.0% had a female householder with no husband present, and 20.3% were non-families. 16.8% of all households were made up of individuals. The average household size was 2.69 and the average family size was 3.00.

In the city, the population was spread out, with 21.6% under the age of 18, 7.6% from 18 to 24, 23.6% from 25 to 44, 31.7% from 45 to 64, and 15.4% who were 65 years of age or older. The median age was 43 years. For every 100 females, there were 97.5 males. For every 100 females age 18 and over, there were 93.6 males.

=== 2015 American Community Survey ===
According to the 2015 American Community Survey, the median income for a household in the city was $69,545, and the median income for a family was $80,655. Males had a median income of $44,737 versus $28,214 for females. The per capita income for the city was $27,116. About 8.6% of families and 12.4% of the population were below the poverty line, including 18.8% of those under age 18 and 3.1% of those age 65 or over.

== Government and infrastructure ==
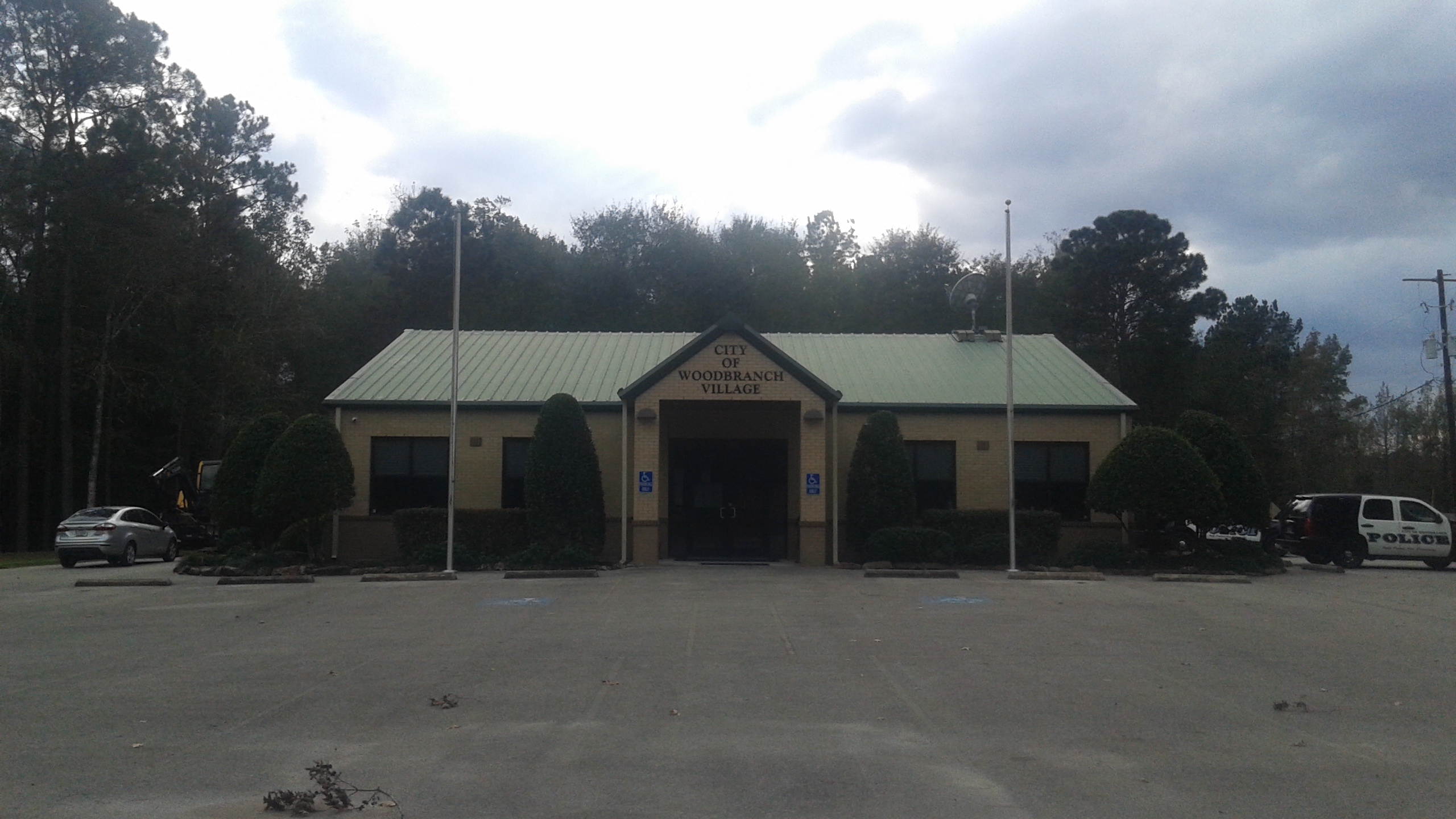
City Hall.

As an incorporated city with a population of less than 5000, Woodbranch Village is designated as a general law city under the Constitution of Texas. It is governed at the local level by an elected mayor and five council members.

In the Texas Senate, Woodbranch is in District 4, represented by Republican Brandon Creighton. In the Texas House of Representatives, Woodbranch is in District 16, represented by Republican Will Metcalf.

In the United States Senate, Republicans John Cornyn and Ted Cruz represent the entire state of Texas. In the United States House of Representatives, Woodbranch is in District 8, represented by Republican Kevin Brady.

There is no post office located within the city limits of Woodbranch. The nearest post office is located in New Caney.

A major freeway designated as both Interstate 69 and U.S. Route 59 travels northeast-southwest through Woodbranch, connecting Woodbranch to Houston.

== Education ==
Woodbranch is served by New Caney Independent School District.

Residents are zoned to Tavola Elementary School, Keefer Crossing Middle School, and New Caney High School.

A small portion of residents in the eastern corner of Woodbranch will be zoned to a new school opening in August 2017, Dogwood Elementary. The new school is located in Roman Forest at the site of the former school, Aiken Elementary.

The Texas Legislature designated New Caney ISD (and therefore Woodbranch) as part of Lone Star College (formerly the North Harris Montgomery Community College District).
