= Infinity Early College High School =

Public school in Texas, United States

Location
- 26751 Sorters Rd. New Caney, Texas 77365; United States; 30.059309°N 95.261855°W

Information
- School type: Public high school
- Motto: Take Care of Business (#TCOB)
- Established: 2013
- School district: New Caney Independent School District
- Principal: Erica Sykes
- Faculty: 19.4 (on an FTE basis)
- Grades: 9-12
- Enrollment: 395 (2021-2022)
- Student to teacher ratio: 20.4
- Colors: Purple & Black
- Athletics conference: UIL Class AAA
- Mascot: Knight
- Team name: Knights
- Rival: New Caney High School Porter High School
- Website: iechs.newcaneyisd.org

Infinity Early College High School (Infinity ECHS) is a secondary public school in Porter, Texas, and is part of the New Caney Independent School District. Infinity ECHS partners with Lone Star College Kingwood to offer students both a diploma and associate's degree. Infinity ECHS is classified as an AAA school by the University Interscholastic League (UIL). The school colors, purple and black, are a blend of blue and red, paying homage to the district's other two high schools at the time of opening, New Caney High School and Porter High School.

== History ==
Infinity ECHS was founded in 2013 for residents of New Caney and Porter. Partnering with the Lone Star College Kingwood, students can earn a college degree while in secondary school. The school initially operated at New Caney High School annex building until December 2017. In January 2018, Infinity ECHS moved to new building, halfway through the 2017-2018 school year enabling students to walk to Lone Star College without the need for bus transportation.

== Demographics ==
In the 2021-2022 school year, there were 395 students enrolled at Infinity ECHS. The ethnic distribution of the students was as follows:

- 4.8% African American
- 3.3% Asian
- 73.7% Hispanic
- 17% White
- 1.3% Two or more races

43.4% of its students are classified as 'at risk of dropping out,' and 60% of students come from economically disadvantaged backgrounds.

== Academics ==
Infinity Early College High School is ranked by Children at Risk, placing 11th among other secondary schools in the Greater Houston Area. Niche rated the school an overall "A". For the 2022-2024 school years, Infinity ECHS is aligned to the AAA conference by UIL.

Infinity Early College High School has Advanced Placement courses and participates in the National Honor Society. According to Texas Academic Performance Reports, for the 2021-2022 school year the school had a 100% graduation rate. Infinity's students performed well in college readiness standards with 98.6% are prepared in reading, 97.3% in math, and 95.9% in both reading and math compared to students in the New Caney Independent School District with 31% considered ready in reading, 17.7% ready in math, and 16.5% ready in both reading and math.
