= Porter, Texas =

Coordinates: 30°06′09″N 95°13′47″W

Porter
- Unincorporated community
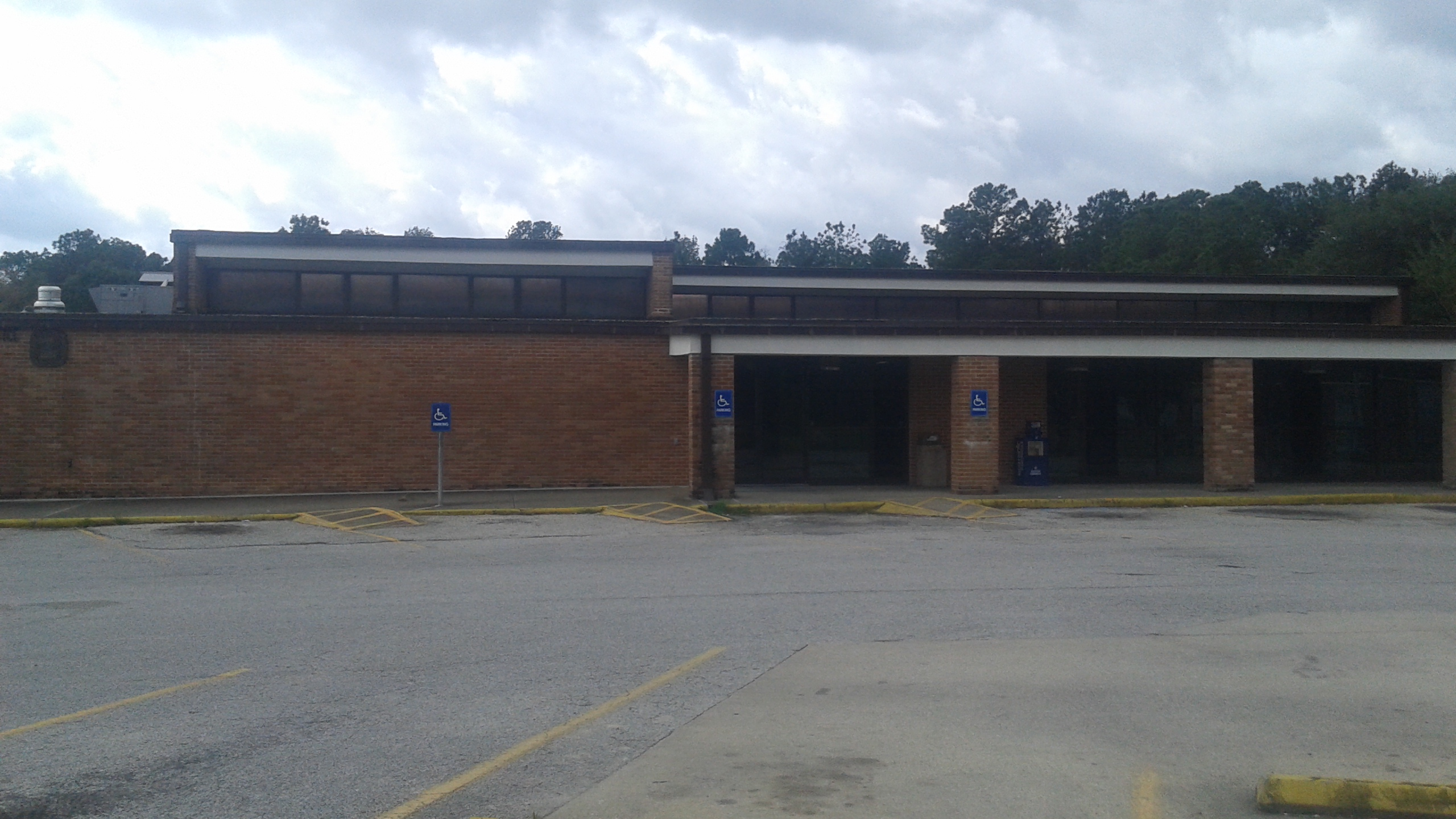
- Post Office in Porter.
- Interactive map of Porter
- Country: United States
- State: Texas
- County: Montgomery

Population
  - Total: 25,769
- Zip code: 77365

Porter is an unincorporated community in Montgomery County in Southeastern Texas, United States, within the Houston–Pasadena–The Woodlands metropolitan area. In 2010, its population was estimated at 25,769. Porter is north of the Kingwood area of Houston.

== Geography ==
As an unincorporated community, Porter does not have officially defined geographical boundaries. Instead, the area is unofficially defined by its zip code of 77365 due to the presence of a post office by that name in the area. No incorporated municipalities are within this zip code, with the census designated place of Porter Heights also having no official status beyond its use for census purposes. New Caney Independent School District, which encompasses the unincorporated communities of both Porter and New Caney, defines for the purposes of its attendance zones the entire zip code of 77365 as representing the entire "city" of Porter.

== History ==
The earliest settlement in east Montgomery County developed in what is now New Caney, just north of Porter, along the banks of what is now known as Caney Creek. A group of cattle ranchers settled in the area in the 1860s, with the first reported settlement in 1862. When the Houston, East and West Texas Railroad built through the area in the late 1870s and early 1880s, an influx of settlers moved to various points along the new railway. One of these early residents was James Porter, who operated a sawmill. When the post office opened in 1892, the town was referred to as "Porters," in reference possibly to a denied petition to the post office to name the town "Porter's Mill." In 1953, the post office decided to drop the "s," resulting in the town's current name of Porter.

== Demographics ==
In the 2010 United States census, Zip Code 77365, generally defined as the unofficial boundary of Porter, had 25,769 people, 8,534 households, and 6,620 families. The racial makeup of the area was 79.8% White, 2.8% African American, 0.9% American Indian and Alaskan Native, 1.2% Asian, 13.0% were some other race, and 2.3% were two or more races. 31.9% were Hispanic or Latino of any race, and 26.8% were Mexican.

Of 8,534 households, 38.1% had children under the age of 18, 58.5% were husband-wife families, and 17.7% had a householder living alone. The average household size was 3.00, the average family size was 3.39.

In the 2018 American Community Survey, the median household income was $73,873. The median family income was $81,016 and per capita income was $33,905. Median earnings were $42,284 for males and $24,908 for females. 9.1% of families and 10.1% of all people had an income below the poverty level.

== Government and infrastructure ==
=== Local government ===
As an unincorporated community, Porter does not have its own municipal government. Therefore, all local administrative duties are handled at the county level by Montgomery County, precinct 4. As of June 2022, the county commissioner for the precinct is James Metts.

=== State government ===
In the Texas Senate, Porter is in District 4, represented by Republican Brandon Creighton.

In the Texas House of Representatives, 83.8% of Porter is in District 3, represented by Republican Cecil Bell Jr. 13.7% of Porter is in District 16, represented by Republican Will Metcalf. The remaining 2.5% are in Districts 15 and 127.

=== Federal government ===
In the United States Senate, Republicans John Cornyn and Ted Cruz represent the entire state of Texas.

In the United States House of Representatives, Porter is part of District 8, represented by Republican Morgan Luttrell.

The United States Postal Service Porter Post Office is located at 23550 Partners Way.

=== Transportation ===
- Interstate 69, which is combined with U.S. Highway 59, connects Porter to Houston.
- State Highway 99, also known as the Grand Parkway, travels through Porter. It is the outermost beltway surrounding Houston.
- Farm to Market Road 1314 runs from Porter to Conroe.

== Education ==
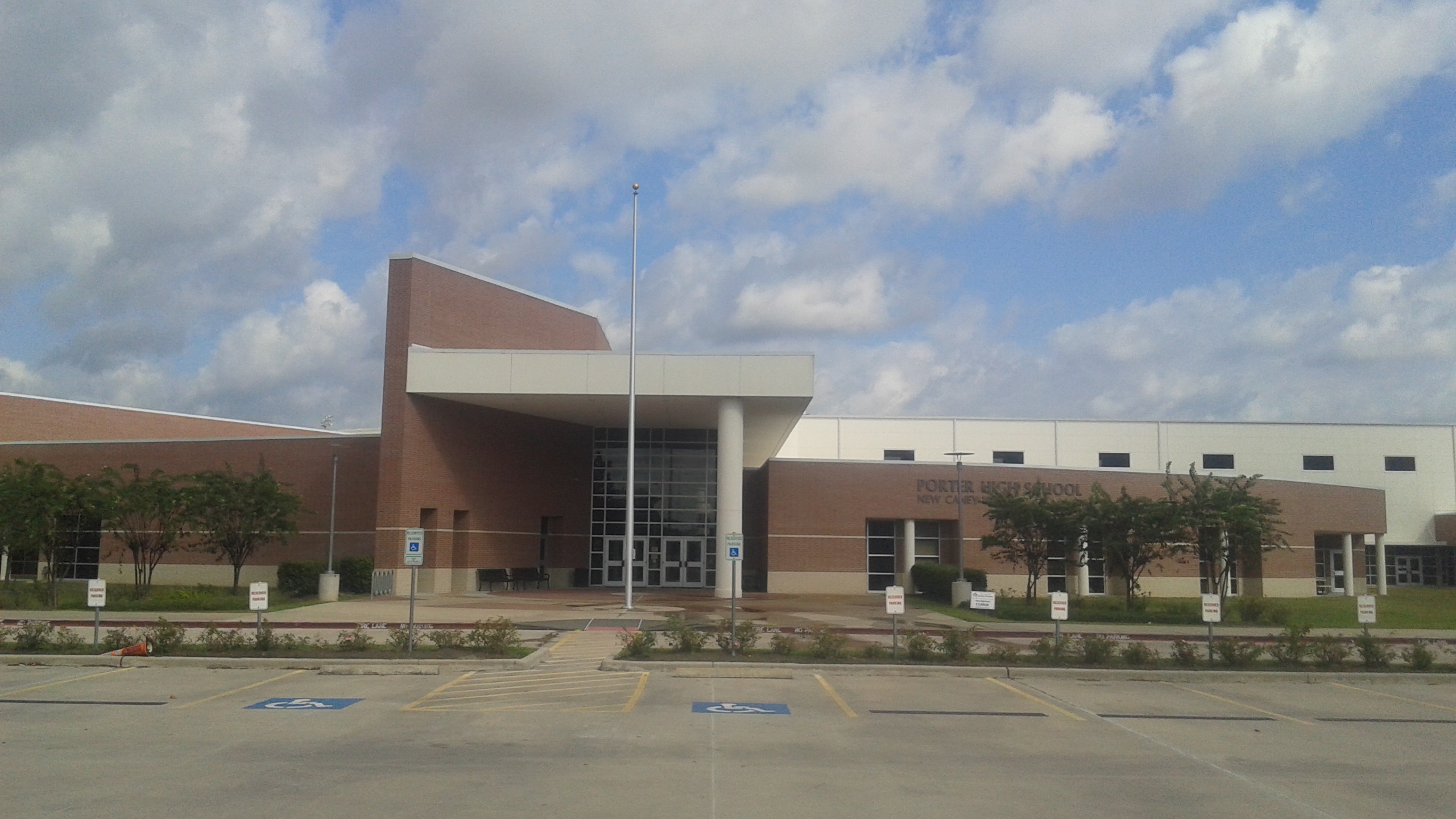
Porter High School, New Caney ISD.

Porter became a part of the New Caney Independent School District in 1965. New Caney Independent School District is a public school district based in New Caney, an unincorporated area of southeastern Montgomery County just north of Porter.

Students in grades K-5 attend one of the following schools:

- Porter Elementary
- Bens Branch Elementary
- Valley Ranch Elementary
- Sorters Mill Elementary
- Crippen Elementary
- Kings Manor Elementary

Students in grades 6-8 attend one of the following schools:

- Pine Valley Middle School
- Woodridge Forest Middle School
- White Oak Middle School
- Keefer Crossing Middle School

Students in grades 9-12 attend one of the following schools:

- Porter High School
- New Caney High School
- Infinity Early College High School
- West Fork High School

== Notable people ==
American astronaut Robert Crippen grew up in Porter. He was the pilot of the first orbital test flight of the Space Shuttle program and was the commander of three additional shuttle flights. New Caney Independent School District later named Robert L. Crippen Elementary School after him.

Jason "Sundance" Head (born July 9, 1978) was the winner of season 11 of The Voice and lives in Porter.

== Media representation ==
The 1957–1959 CBS Western television series Trackdown, starring Robert Culp, was set in a fictional Porter.
