= New Caney Independent School District =

School district in Texas, United States

Address
- 21580 Loop 494 New Caney, Texas, 77357; United States

District information
- Type: Public
- Motto: A Shining Star in Texas Education
- Grades: PK–12
- Established: January 12, 1957; 69 years ago
- Superintendent: Matt Calvert
- Governing agency: Texas Education Agency
- Schools: 20
- NCES District ID: 4832400

Students and staff
- Enrollment: 15,381 (2018–2019)
- Teachers: 1,030.24 (on an FTE basis)
- Staff: 1,072.09 (on an FTE basis)
- Student–teacher ratio: 14.93

Other information
- Website: www.newcaneyisd.org

New Caney Independent School District (NCISD) is a public school district based in New Caney—an unincorporated area of southeastern Montgomery County, Texas (USA) within the Houston–Pasadena–The Woodlands metropolitan area.

NCISD serves the cities of Roman Forest and Woodbranch, as well as much of Porter Heights, and much of the minuscule Montgomery County portion of Houston. NCISD also serves the unincorporated communities of Porter and New Caney.

For the 2018–2019 school year, the district received a score of 85 out of 100 from the Texas Education Agency.

== History ==
A common school district in the New Caney area was established in 1938. The district was converted into an independent school district on January 12, 1957.

== Schools ==
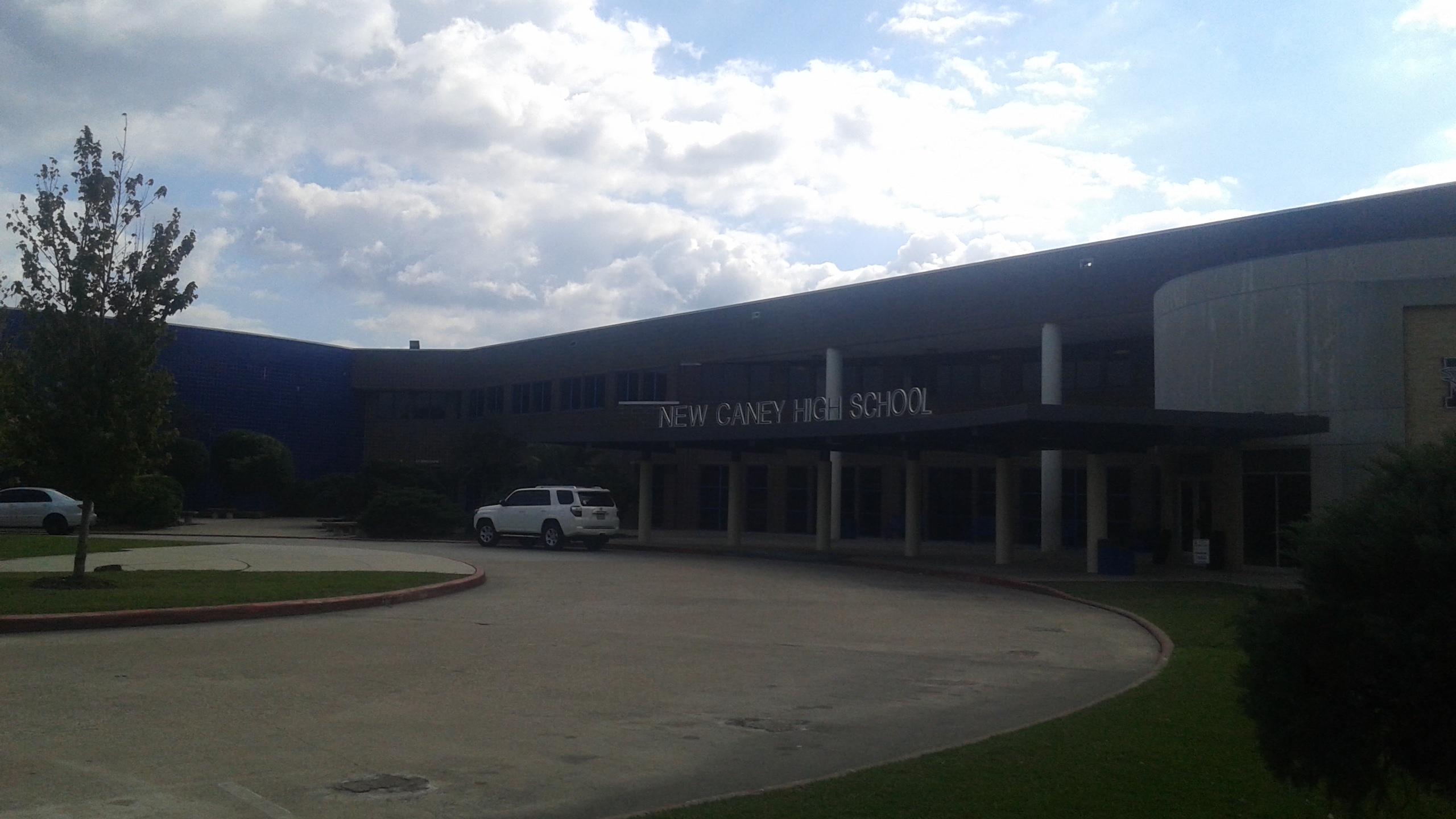
New Caney High School

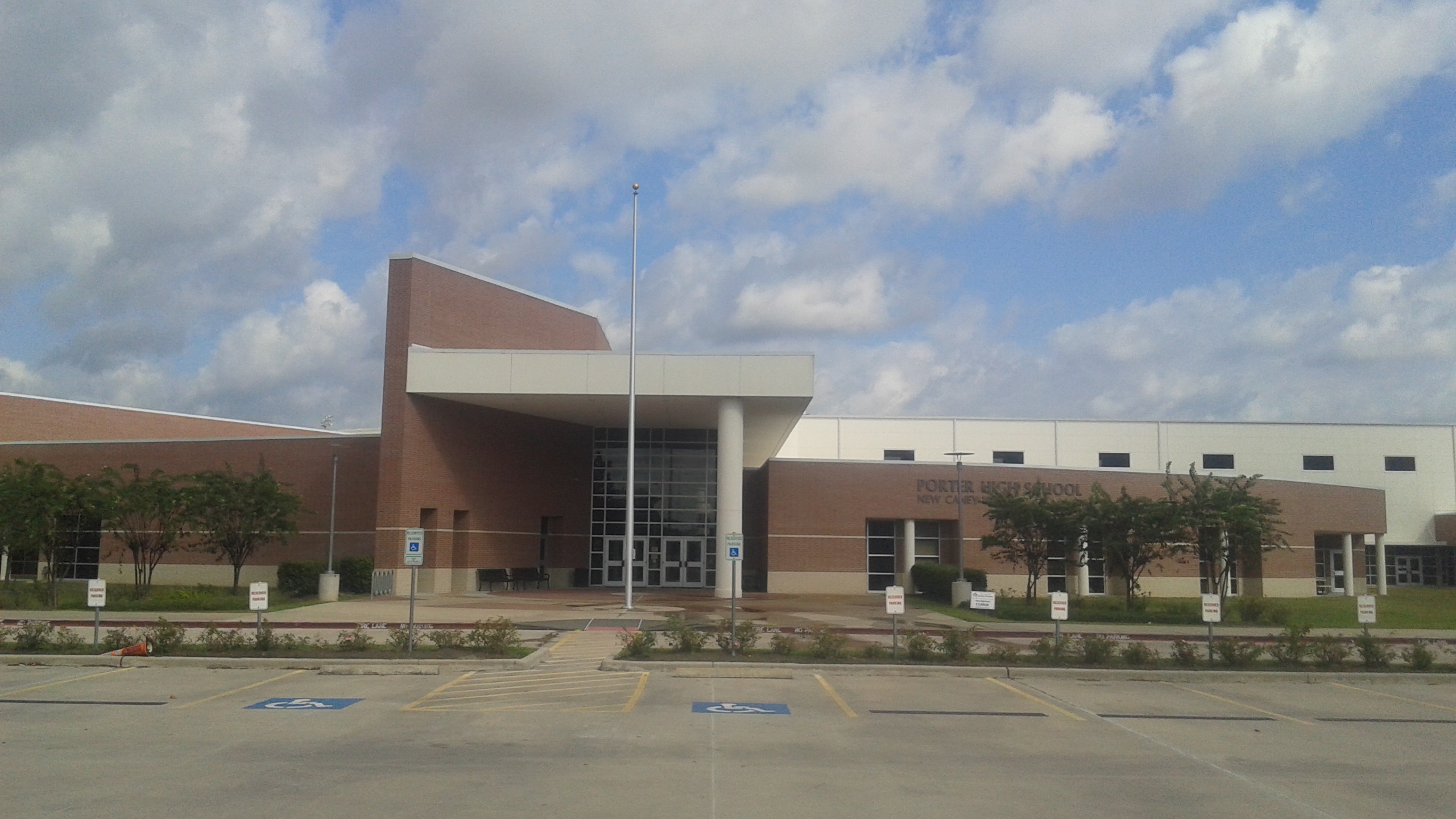
Porter High School

High schools (9-12)

- New Caney High School
- Porter High School
- Infinity Early College High School
- West Fork High School

Middle schools (6-8)

- Keefer Crossing Middle School
- Pine Valley Middle School
- White Oak Middle School
- Woodridge Forest Middle School

Elementary schools (K-5)

- Bens Branch Elementary School
- Brookwood Forest Elementary School
- Crippen Elementary School
- Dogwood Elementary School
- Highlands Elementary
- Kings Manor Elementary School
- New Caney Elementary School
- Oakley Elementary School
- Porter Elementary School
- Sorters Mill Elementary School
- Tavola Elementary School
- Valley Ranch Elementary School
