= Roman Forest, Texas =

- City
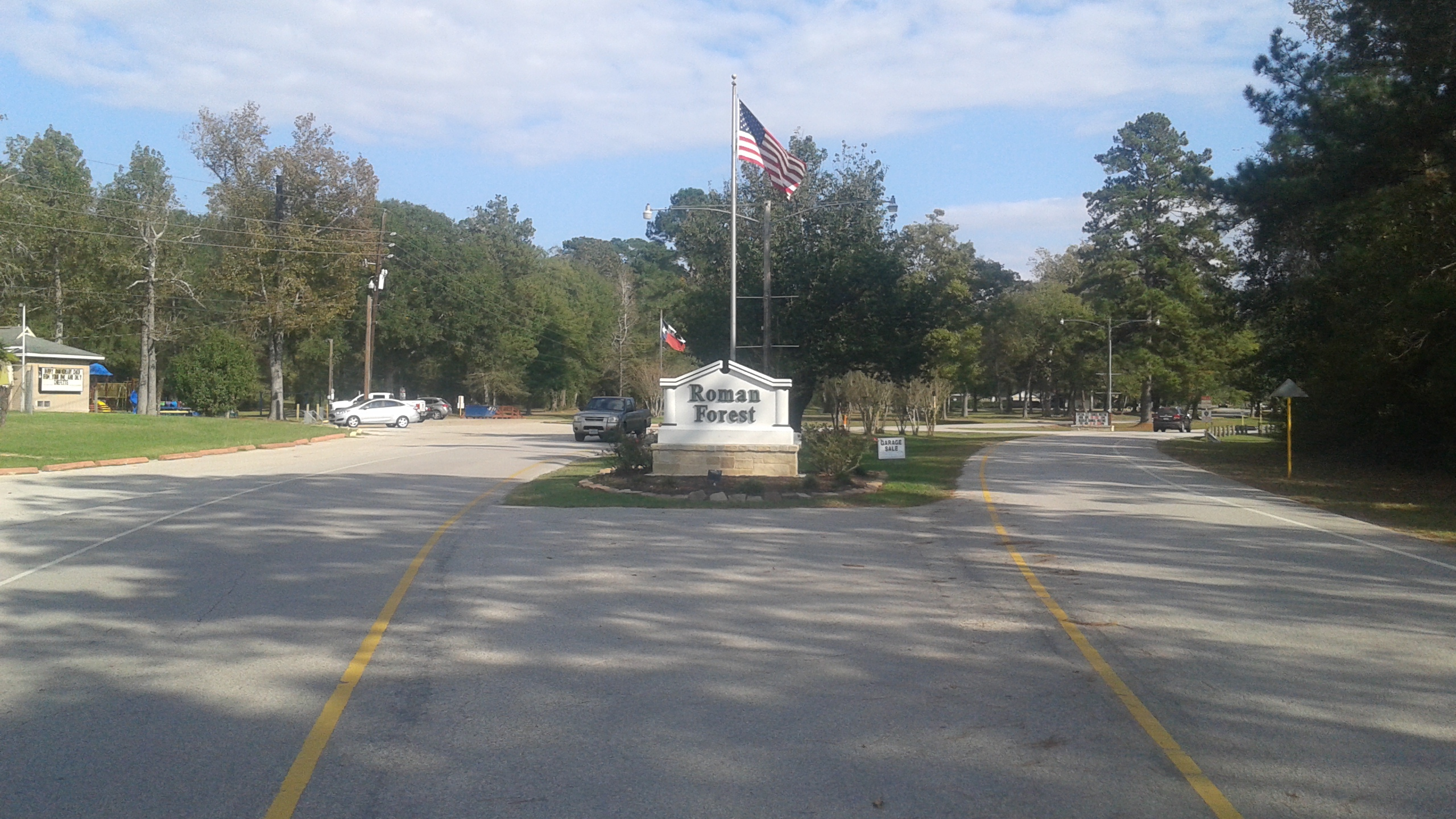
- Welcome sign at the entrance to Roman Forest

- Roman Forest within Montgomery County

- Location in Texas Location in the United States
- Coordinates: 30°10′47″N 95°9′47″W
- Country: United States
- State: Texas
- Counties: Montgomery

Government
  - Type: Type A general-law municipality
  - Mayor: Chris Parr
  - Council members: Mitchell Davis; Dave Mullane; Jerry Reasner; Ricky Warwick; Larry Sanders

Area
  - Total: 2.20 sq mi (5.70 km^{2})
  - Land: 2.18 sq mi (5.64 km^{2})
  - Water: 0.023 sq mi (0.06 km^{2})
- Elevation: 105 ft (32 m)

Population (2020)
  - Total: 1,781
  - Density: 921.8/sq mi (355.91/km^{2})
- Time zone: UTC-6 (Central (CST))
  - Summer (DST): UTC-5 (CDT)
- ZIP code: 77357
- FIPS code: 48-63044
- GNIS feature ID: 1388597
- Website: www.rftx.org

Roman Forest is a city in Montgomery County, Texas, United States. The population was 1,781 at the 2020 census.

== Geography ==
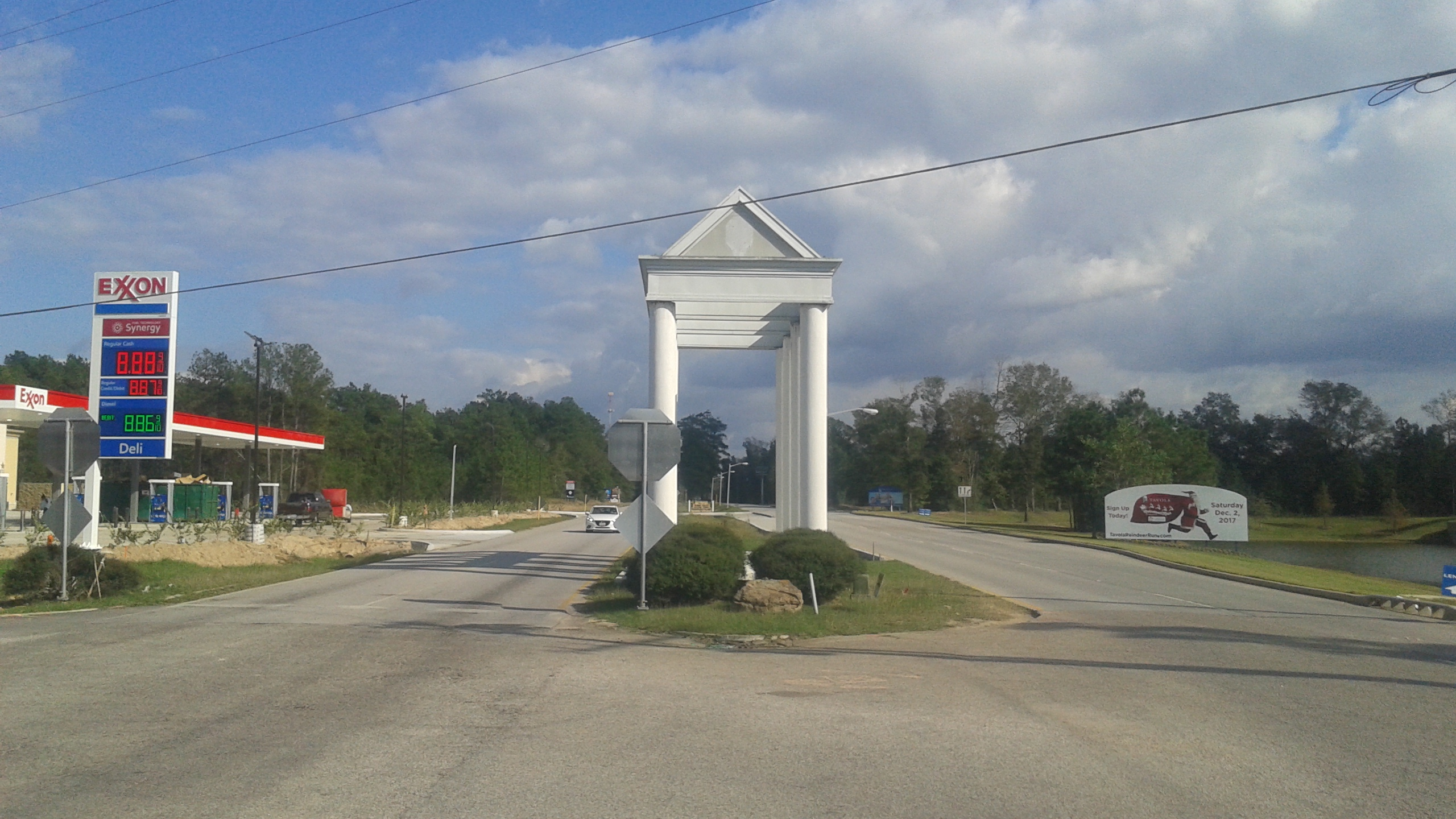
Roman-style pillars on Roman Forest Boulevard near Interstate 69

According to the United States Census Bureau, the City has a total area of 1.5 square miles (3.9 km^{2}), all land.

=== Climate ===
The climate in this area is characterized by hot, humid summers and generally mild to cool winters. According to the Köppen Climate Classification system, Roman Forest has a humid subtropical climate, abbreviated "Cfa" on climate maps.

== Demographics ==
Historical population
Census	Pop.	Note	%±
1980	929		—
1990	1,033		11.2%
2000	1,279		23.8%
2010	1,538		20.3%
2020	1,781		15.8%
U.S. Decennial Census

=== 2020 census ===
As of the 2020 census, Roman Forest had a population of 1,781, a median age of 46.1 years, 19.3% of residents under the age of 18, 21.1% of residents 65 years of age or older, 93.2 males for every 100 females, and 91.6 males for every 100 females age 18 and over. The census counted 542 families residing in the city.

92.0% of residents lived in urban areas, while 8.0% lived in rural areas.

There were 671 households in Roman Forest, of which 31.9% had children under the age of 18 living in them. Of all households, 65.7% were married-couple households, 11.3% were households with a male householder and no spouse or partner present, and 18.9% were households with a female householder and no spouse or partner present. About 16.0% of all households were made up of individuals and 7.8% had someone living alone who was 65 years of age or older.

There were 714 housing units, of which 6.0% were vacant. The homeowner vacancy rate was 2.3% and the rental vacancy rate was 13.2%.

Racial composition as of the 2020 census
Race	Number	Percent
White	1,445	81.1%
Black or African American	48	2.7%
American Indian and Alaska Native	16	0.9%
Asian	21	1.2%
Native Hawaiian and Other Pacific Islander	2	0.1%
Some other race	88	4.9%
Two or more races	161	9.0%
Hispanic or Latino (of any race)	301	16.9%

=== 2010 census ===
As of the 2010 United States census, there were 1,538 people, 547 households, and 468 families residing in the town. The racial makeup of the town was 92.0% White, 1.3% African American, 0.4% Native American, 1.9% Asian, 3.1% from other races, and 1.3% from two or more races. Hispanic or Latino of any race were 10.3% of the population.

There were 547 households, out of which 30.5% had children under the age of 18 living with them, 74.8% were married couples living together, 6.8% had a female householder with no husband present, and 14.4% were non-families. 11.9% of all households were made up of individuals. The average household size was 2.80 and the average family size was 3.00.

In the city the population was spread out, with 23.3% under the age of 18, 6.2% from 18 to 24, 22.6% from 25 to 44, 32.5% from 45 to 64, and 15.2% who were 65 years of age or older. The median age was 43.6 years. For every 100 females, there were 93.7 males. For every 100 females age 18 and over, there were 95.2 males.

=== 2015 American Community Survey ===
According to the 2015 American Community Survey, The median income for a household in the town was $93,289, and the median income for a family was $95,505. Males had a median income of $50,343 versus $40,074 for females. The per capita income for the town was $30,982. About 0.6% of families and 2.0% of the population were below the poverty line, including 0.7% of those under age 18 and 9.6% of those age 65 or over.

== Government ==
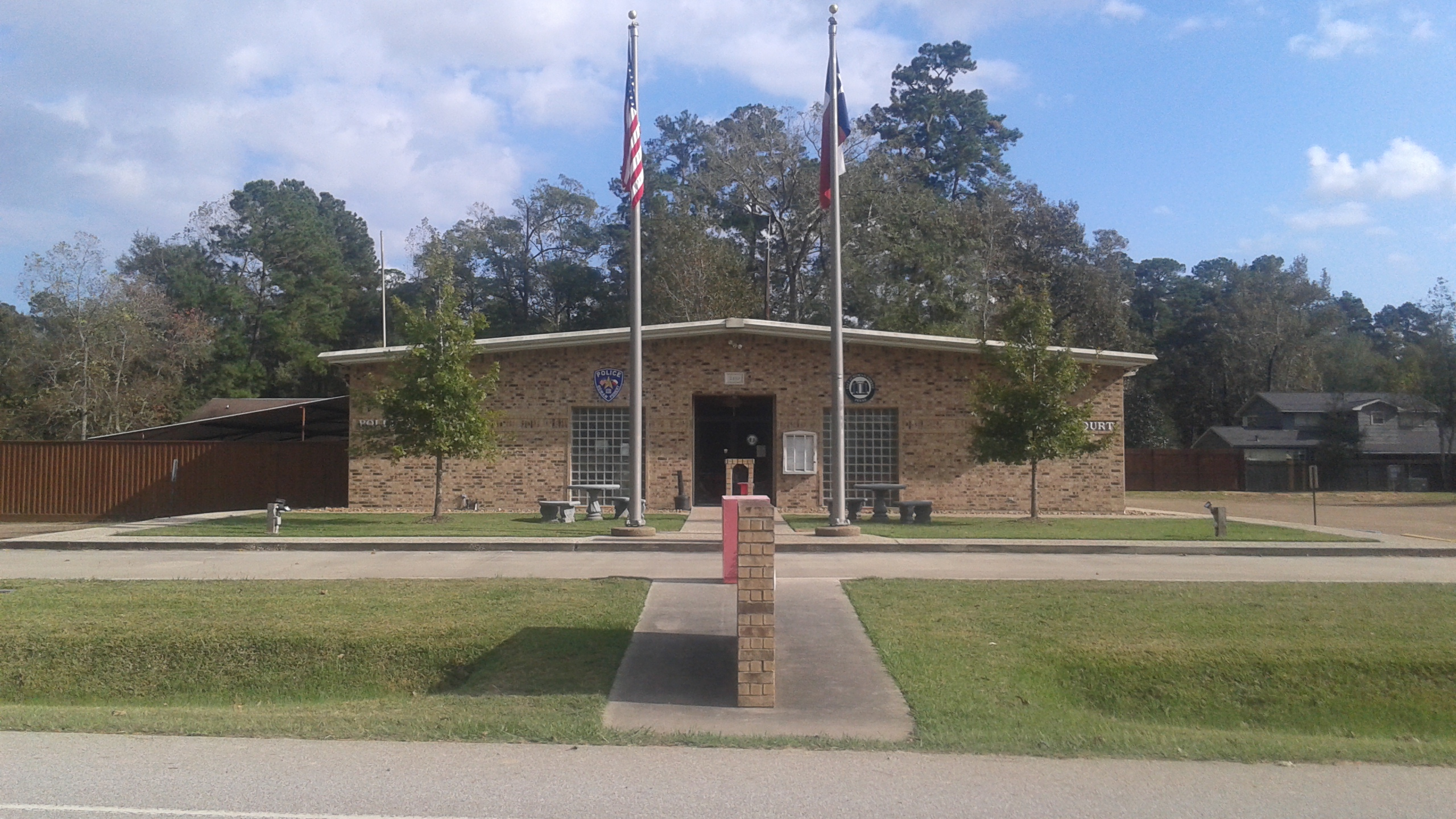
City Hall of Roman Forest, Texas.

The city of Roman Forest is governed by a mayor and five council members. The city also operates its own police department and municipal court. Fire and first responder services are provided by Montgomery County Emergency Service District No. 7, also known as the East Montgomery County Fire Department.

In the Texas Senate, Roman Forest is part of District 4, represented by Republican Brandon Creighton. In the Texas House of Representatives, Roman Forest is part of District 18, represented by Republican Janis Holt.

In the United States Senate, Republicans John Cornyn and Ted Cruz represent the entire state of Texas. In the United States House of Representatives, Roman Forest is part of District 2, represented by Republican Dan Crenshaw.

The United States Postal Service does not operate a post office in Roman Forest. The nearest post office is located in New Caney.

== Education ==
Roman Forest is served by New Caney Independent School District.

Residents are zoned to Dogwood Elementary School, Keefer Crossing Middle School, and New Caney High School.

Aikin Elementary School was the elementary school serving Roman Forest. From 2015 to 2017, Tavola Elementary served the Roman Forest community while Aikin Elementary was being rebuilt. Aikin Elementary will reopen in August 2017 as Dogwood Elementary. All Roman Forest students will attend Dogwood Elementary at the start of the 2017–2018 New Caney ISD school year.

The Texas Legislature designated New Caney ISD (and therefore Roman Forest) as part of Lone Star College (formerly the North Harris Montgomery Community College District).
