= Porter Heights, Texas =

Populated place in Texas, United States

- CDP
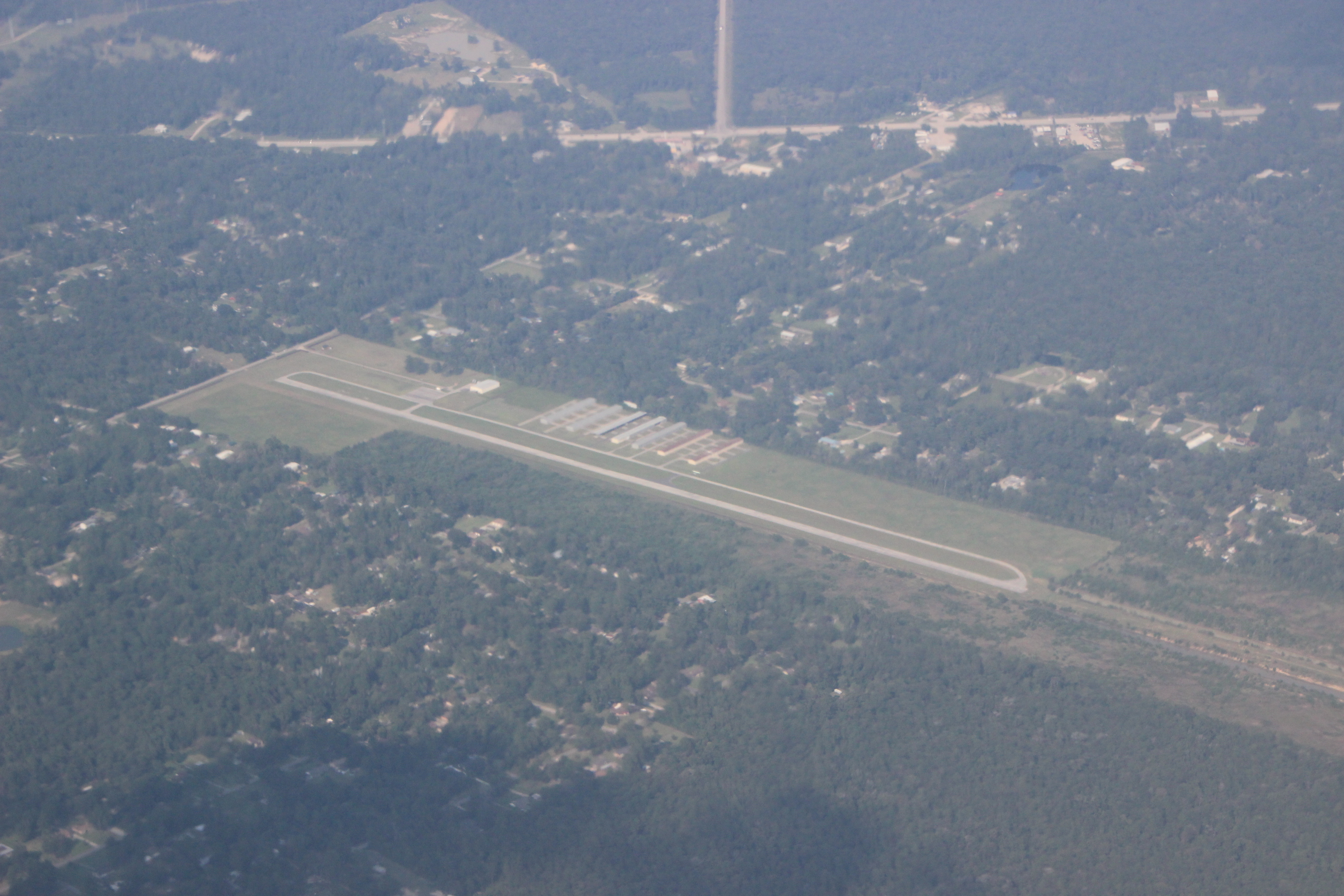
- Porter Heights with North Houston Airport, looking northeastwards

- Location of Porter Heights, Texas
- Coordinates: 30°9′1″N 95°19′3″W
- Country: United States
- State: Texas
- County: Montgomery

Area
  - Total: 3.2 sq mi (8.2 km^{2})
  - Land: 3.2 sq mi (8.2 km^{2})
  - Water: 0 sq mi (0.0 km^{2})
- Elevation: 125 ft (38 m)

Population (2020)
  - Total: 1,903
  - Density: 522/sq mi (201.6/km^{2})
- Time zone: UTC-6 (Central (CST))
  - Summer (DST): UTC-5 (CDT)
- FIPS code: 48-58850
- GNIS feature ID: 1867563

Porter Heights is a census-designated place (CDP) in Montgomery County, Texas, United States. The population was 1,903 at the 2020 census.

== Geography ==
Porter Heights is located at 30°9′1″N 95°19′3″W (30.150324, -95.317496).

According to the United States Census Bureau, the CDP has a total area of 3.2 square miles (8.3 km^{2}), of which 3.2 square miles (8.3 km^{2}) is land and 0.32% is water.

== Demographics ==
Historical population
Census	Pop.	Note	%±
1980	1,331		—
1990	1,448		8.8%
2000	1,490		2.9%
2010	1,653		10.9%
2020	1,903		15.1%
U.S. Decennial Census; 1850–1900 1910; 1920 1930 1940; 1950 1960 1970; 1980 1990 2000; 2010

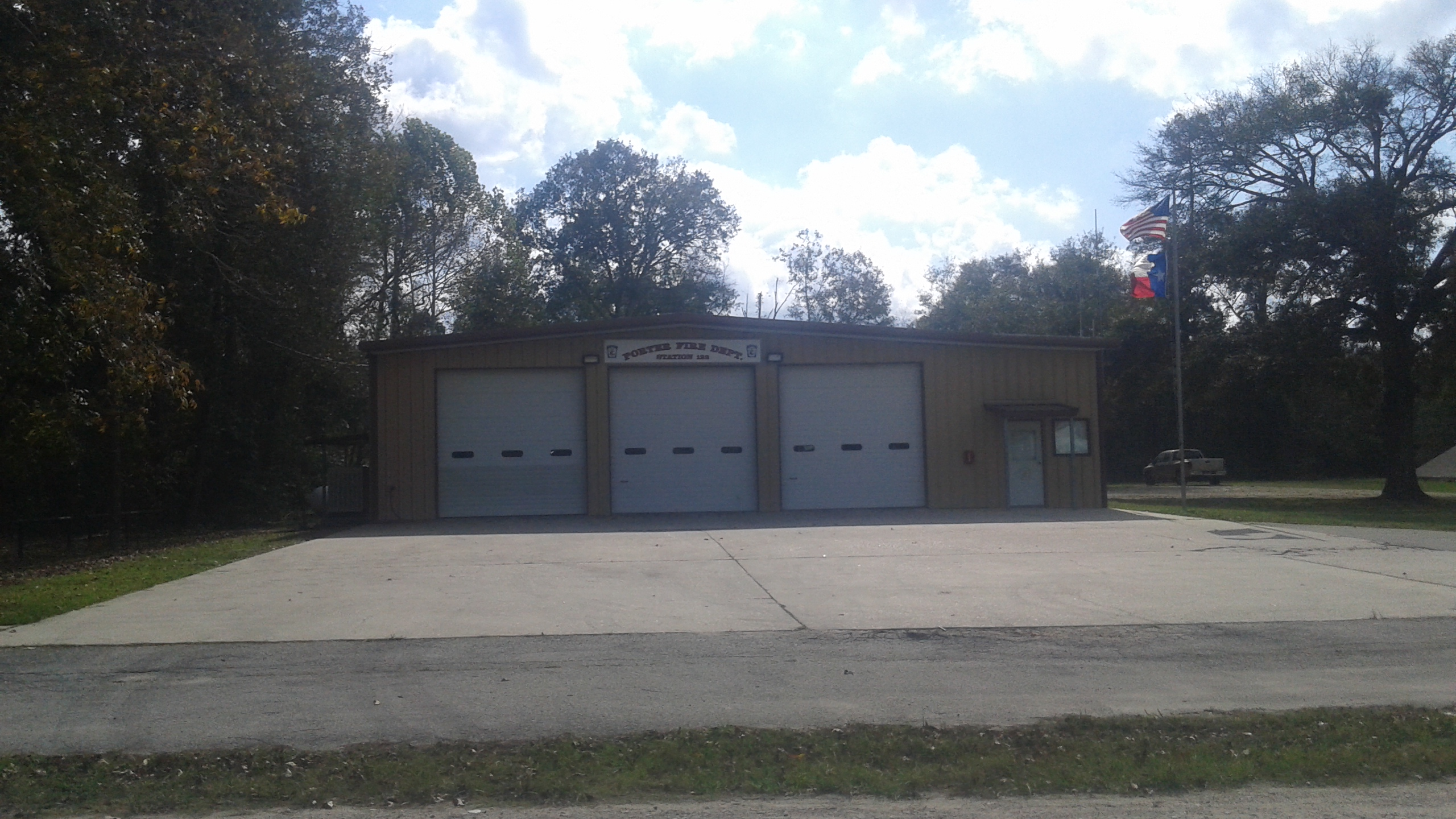
Volunteer Fire Department for Porter Heights

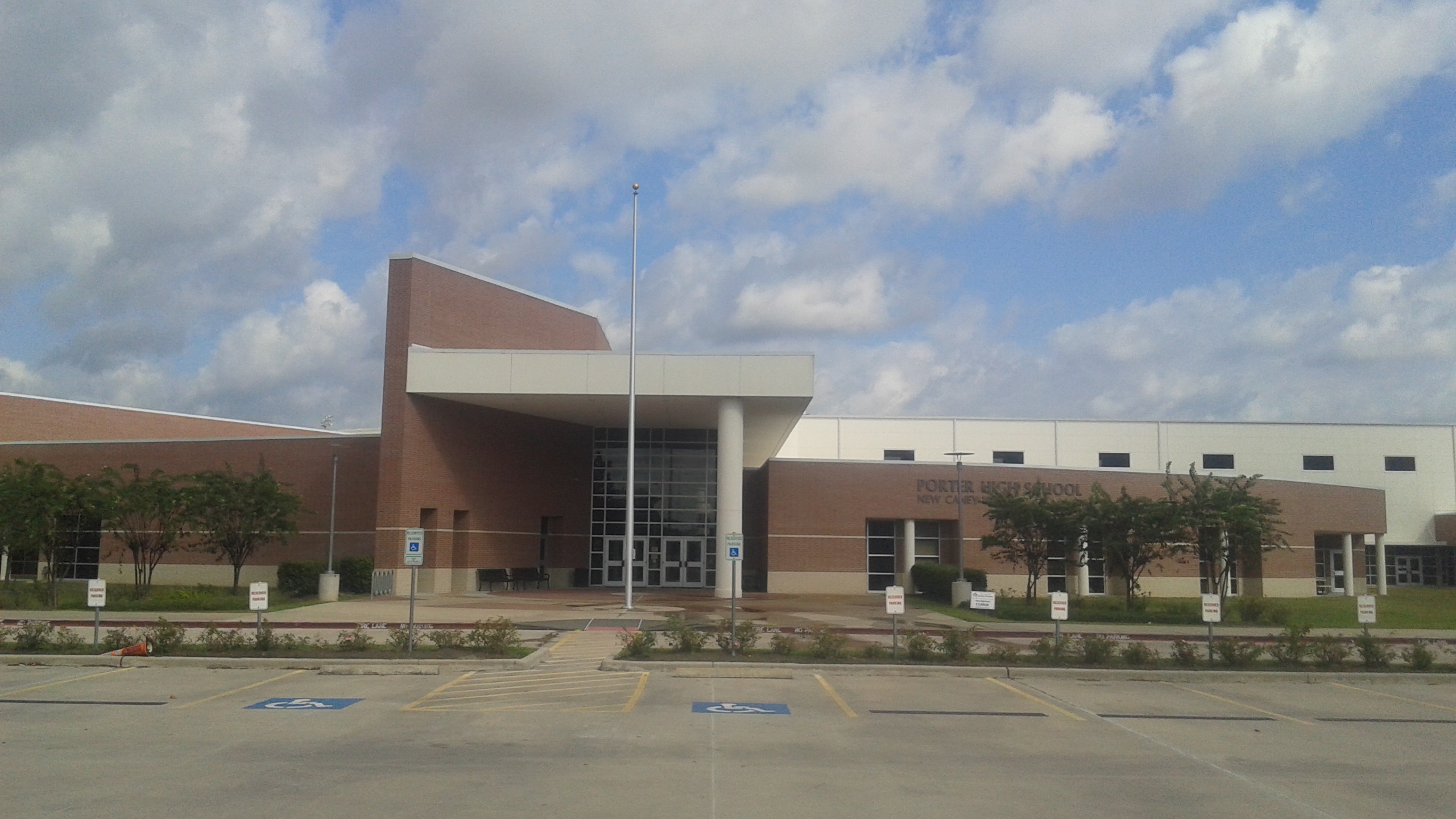
Porter High School, located south of Porter Heights. Part of New Caney ISD.

Porter Heights first appeared as a census designated place in the 1980 United States census.

=== 2020 census ===
Porter Heights CDP, Texas – Racial and ethnic composition Note: the US Census treats Hispanic/Latino as an ethnic category. This table excludes Latinos from the racial categories and assigns them to a separate category. Hispanics/Latinos may be of any race.
Race / Ethnicity (NH = Non-Hispanic)	Pop 2000	Pop 2010	Pop 2020	% 2000	% 2010	% 2020
White alone (NH)	1,347	1,216	1,076	90.40%	73.56%	56.54%
Black or African American alone (NH)	6	11	25	0.40%	0.67%	1.31%
Native American or Alaska Native alone (NH)	5	20	6	0.34%	1.21%	0.32%
Asian alone (NH)	4	5	8	0.27%	0.30%	0.42%
Native Hawaiian or Pacific Islander alone (NH)	0	0	0	0.00%	0.00%	0.00%
Other race alone (NH)	0	5	9	0.00%	0.30%	0.47%
Mixed race or Multiracial (NH)	16	11	62	1.07%	0.67%	3.26%
Hispanic or Latino (any race)	112	385	717	7.52%	23.29%	37.68%
Total	1,490	1,653	1,903	100.00%	100.00%	100.00%

As of the 2020 United States census, there were 1,903 people, 420 households, and 373 families residing in the CDP.

As of the 2010 United States census, there were 1,490 people, 562 households, and 423 families residing in the CDP. The racial makeup of the CDP was 85.7% White, 0.7% African American, 2.2% Native American, 0.3% Asian, 8.8% from other races, and 2.2% from two or more races. Hispanic or Latino of any race were 23.3% of the population.

There were 562 households, out of which 32.2% had children under the age of 18 living with them, 55.3% were married couples living together, 11.6% had a female householder with no husband present, and 24.7% were non-families. 19.6% of all households were made up of individuals. The average household size was 2.94 and the average family size was 3.37.

In the CDP, the population was spread out, with 27.0% under the age of 18, 8.3% from 18 to 24, 23.7% from 25 to 44, 29.5% from 45 to 64, and 11.5% who were 65 years of age or older. The median age was 38.0 years. For every 100 females, there were 107.4 males. For every 100 females age 18 and over, there were 108.1 males.

As of the 2000 United States census, the median income for a household in the CDP was $37,262, and the median income for a family was $41,615. Males had a median income of $36,522 versus $30,378 for females. The per capita income for the CDP was $16,997. About 4.4% of families and 4.3% of the population were below the poverty line, including none of those under age 18 and 13.6% of those age 65 or over.

== Transportation ==
Farm to Market Road 1314 forms the northeastern boundary of the CDP. To the southeast, its terminus is Porter. To the northwest, its terminus is located inside Conroe. It is also known as Conroe Porter Road.

FM 1314 also connects Porter Heights to the Grand Parkway, which is the outermost beltway around Houston.

A small general aviation airfield called North Houston Airport lies within the CDP. Note: Airport was sold to property developer and permanently shut down in 2021.

== Education ==
Some areas of Porter Heights are zoned to the New Caney Independent School District. Some areas of Porter Heights are zoned to the Conroe Independent School District.

Residents of the New Caney ISD section are zoned to Crippen Elementary School, White Oak Middle School, and Porter High School. Before the opening of Porter High School in 2010, students attended New Caney High School. Sixth graders previously attended the New Caney 6th Grade Campus.

Residents of the Conroe ISD section are zoned to San Jacinto Elementary School, Grangerland Intermediate School, Moorhead Junior High School, and Caney Creek High School.

The Texas Legislature designated both New Caney ISD and Conroe ISD (and therefore all of Porter Heights) as part of Lone Star College (formerly the North Harris Montgomery Community College District).
