= Porter High School =

Public school in Texas, United States

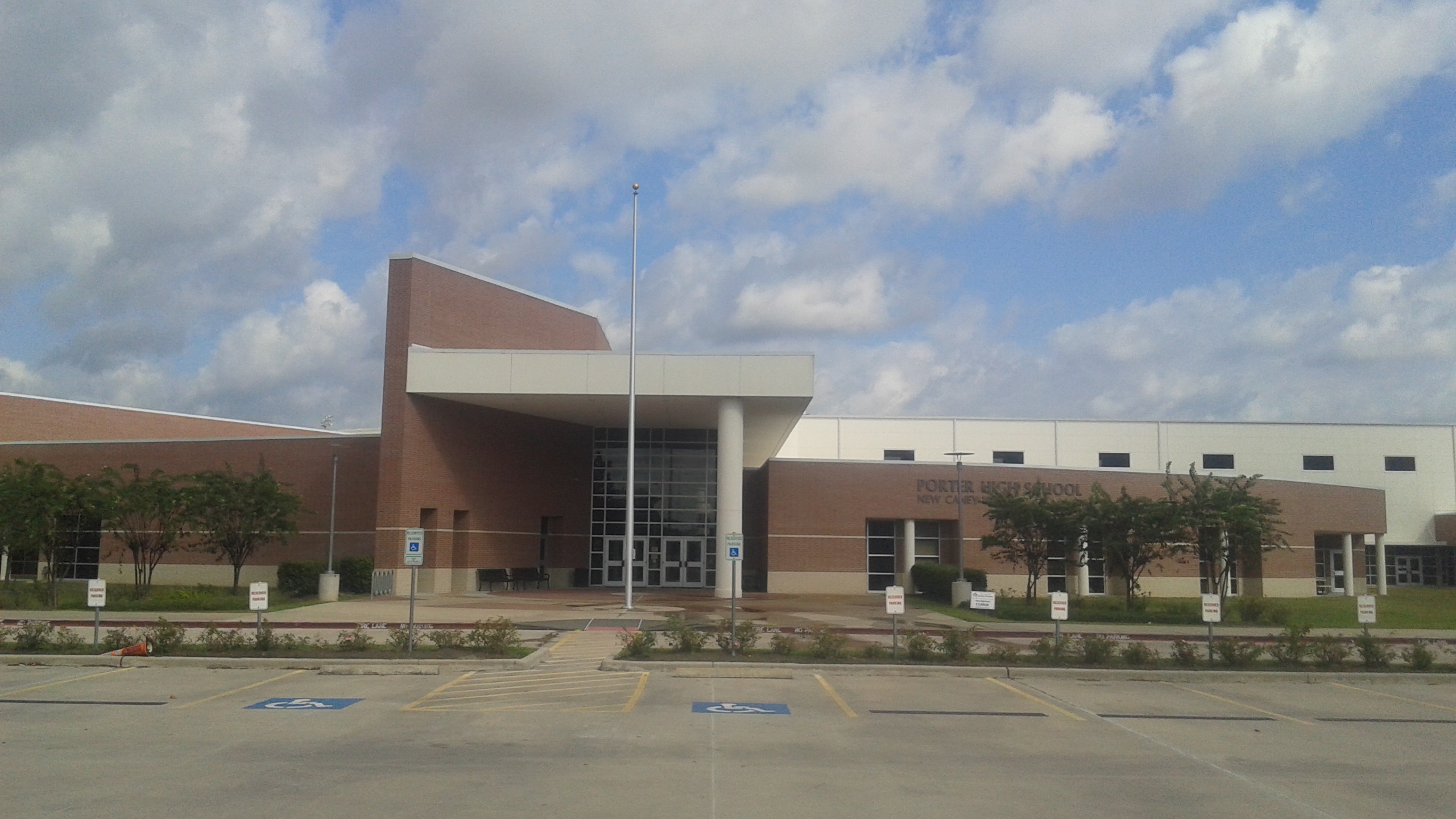

Location
- 22625 Sandy Lane; Porter, Texas 77365; United States; 30.120400°N 95.271098°W

Information
- Established: 2010
- Staff: 141.68 (on an FTE basis)
- Enrollment: 2,120 (2023–2024)
- Student to teacher ratio: 14.96
- Colors: Red, Black
- Mascot: Spartan
- Website: phs.newcaneyisd.org

Porter High School is a school that opened in 2010 in unincorporated Montgomery County, Texas. It is the second high school to New Caney Independent School District. The school is home of the Spartans athletic teams. Its school colors are black and red.

Porter High School opened in August 2010 and had a price of $16 million, including the costs of the land, the buildings, and the furnishings.

Porter High School serves a portion of Porter Heights, a portion of the overall Porter area, and the portion of Houston in Montgomery County.

== Demographics ==
In the 2018–2019 school year, there were 2,017 students enrolled at Porter High School. The ethnic distribution of students was as follows:

- 5.5% African American
- 3.0% Asian
- 0.1% Native Hawaiian/Pacific Islander
- 57.1% Hispanic
- 0.2% American Indian
- 32.1% White
- 2.1% Two or More Races

55.1% of students were eligible for free or reduced-price lunch. The school was eligible for Title I funding.

== Academics ==
For each school year, the Texas Education Agency rates school performance using an A–F grading system based on statistical data. For 2018–2019, the school received a score of 82 out of 100, resulting in a B grade. The school received a score of 79 the previous year.

== Feeder patterns ==
Elementary school (K-5) attendance zones that feed into Porter include Crippen, Sorters Mill, and a portion of the Porter Elementary attendance zone. Feeder middle schools (6-8) include White Oak Middle School.
