= Woodloch, Texas =

Town in Montgomery, Texas, United States

- Town
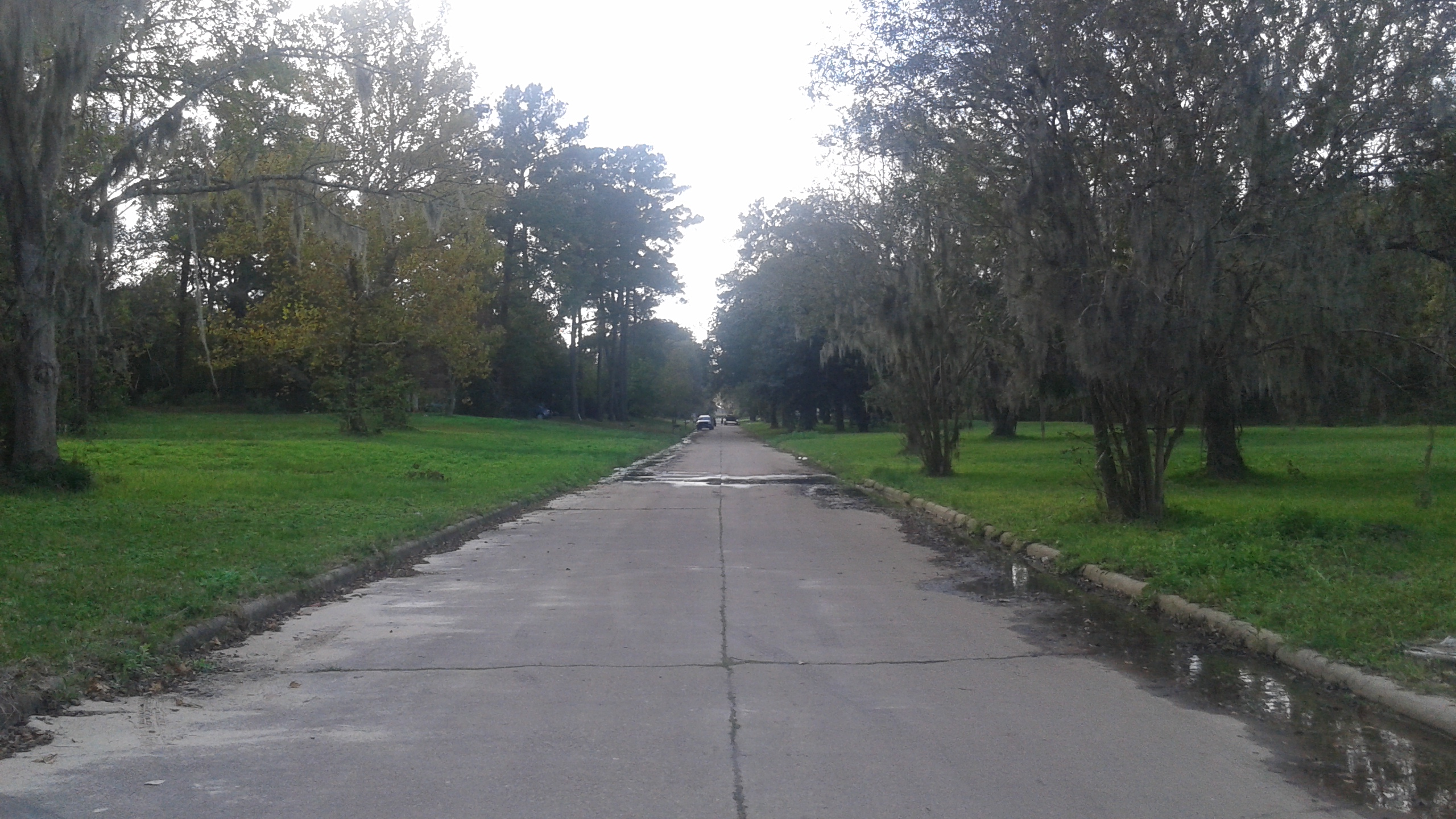
- Facing west on North Woodloch Street

- Woodloch located within Montgomery County

- Location in Texas Location in the United States
- Coordinates: 30°13′5″N 95°24′37″W
- Country: United States
- State: Texas
- Counties: Montgomery
- Incorporated: 1974

Government
  - Mayor: Jason Restrepo
  - Aldermen: Matthew Greening; Rachel Zepeda; Kyle Harfield; Laura Nichols; Empty

Area
  - Total: 0.085 sq mi (0.22 km^{2})
  - Land: 0.085 sq mi (0.22 km^{2})
  - Water: 0 sq mi (0.00 km^{2})
- Elevation: 108 ft (33 m)

Population (2020)
  - Total: 186
  - Density: 2,200/sq mi (850/km^{2})
- Time zone: UTC-6 (Central (CST))
  - Summer (DST): UTC-5 (CDT)
- FIPS code: 48-80144
- GNIS feature ID: 1388602
- Website: woodlochtx.org

Woodloch is a town in Montgomery County, Texas, United States. The population was 186 at the 2020 census. As of January 2026, the mayor is Jason Restrepo.

== Geography ==
Woodloch is located at 30°13′5″N 95°24′37″W (30.217963, –95.410255).

According to the United States Census Bureau, the town has a total area of 0.1 square miles (0.26 km^{2}), all land.

The town consists of three roads: South Woodloch Street, North Woodloch Street, and Needham Road. North and South Woodloch Streets are connected together at the eastern edge of Woodloch. Needham Road, on the western edge, connects the town to State Highway 242.

The west fork of the San Jacinto River flows on the eastern border of the town.

== Government ==
Woodloch is a Type B, General Law municipality, with a mayor and five aldermen.

In the Texas Senate, Woodloch is part of District 4, represented by Republican Brandon Creighton. In the Texas House of Representatives, Woodloch is part of District 15, represented by Republican Steve Toth.

In the United States Senate, Republicans John Cornyn and Ted Cruz represent the entire state of Texas. In the United States House of Representatives, Woodloch is part of District 2, represented by Republican Dan Crenshaw.

== Demographics ==
Historical population
Census	Pop.	Note	%±
1980	351		—
1990	291		−17.1%
2000	247		−15.1%
2010	207		−16.2%
2020	186		−10.1%
U.S. Decennial Census; 2020 Census

As of the 2010 United States census, there were 207 people, 68 households, and 58 families residing in the town. The racial makeup of the town was 93.7% White, 3.4% Black or African American, 1.9% other races, and 1.0% from two or more races. Hispanic or Latino of any race were 8.7% of the population.

There were 68 households, out of which 25.0% had children under the age of 18 living with them, 85.3% were married couples living together, 10.3% had a female householder with no husband present, and 14.7% were non-families. 13.2% of all households were made up of individuals. The average household size was 3.04 and the average family size was 3.26

In the town, the population was spread out, with 24.2% under the age of 18, 9.7% from 18 to 24, 19.8% from 25 to 44, 29.5% from 45 to 64, and 16.9% who were 65 years of age or older. The median age was 42.3 years. For every 100 females, there were 105.0 males. For every 100 females age 18 and over, there were 101.3 males.

In the 2015 American Community Survey, The median income for a household in the town was $76,875 and the median income for a family was $83,750. Males had median earnings of $36,042 versus $25,417 for females. The per capita income for the town was $38,371. 2.3% of the population and none of its families were below the poverty line.

== Education ==
Woodloch is served by Conroe Independent School District.

- Students in grades K–4 attend Houser Elementary.
- Students in grades 5–6 attend Vogel Intermediate.
- Students in grades 7–8 attend Irons Junior High.
- Students in 9th grade attend Oak Ridge 9th Grade Campus.
- Students in grades 10–12 attend Oak Ridge High School.

Residents of Conroe ISD (and therefore Woodloch) are served by the Lone Star College System (formerly North Harris Montgomery Community College).

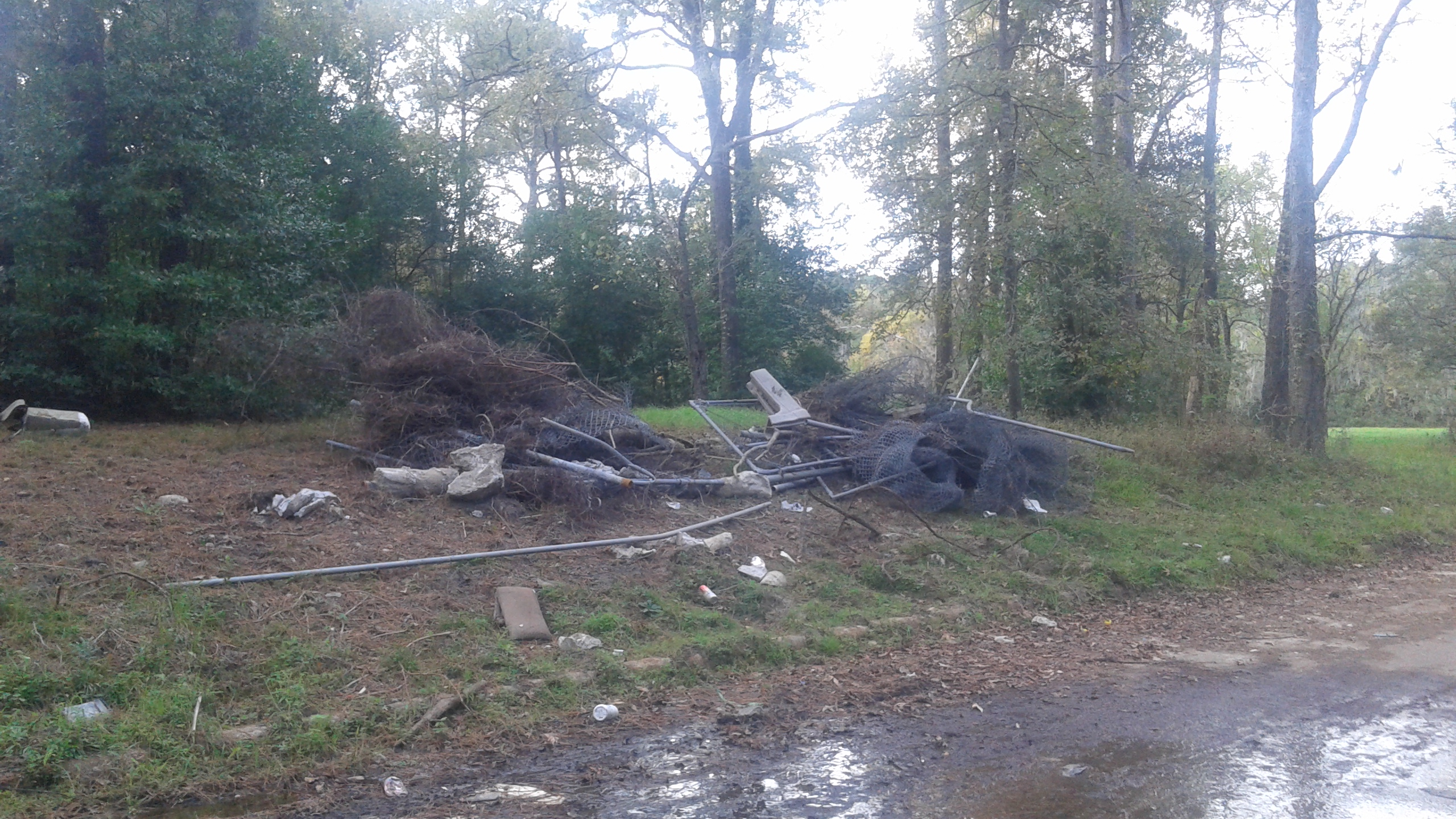
Debris and other trash was a common sight in Woodloch in the aftermath of Hurricane Harvey.

== Hurricane Harvey ==
In 2017, during Hurricane Harvey, the San Jacinto River overflowed its banks, causing between 3–8 feet of water to flow through every home in Woodloch. The flooding was exacerbated by a record release of 79,000 cubic feet of water per second from Lake Conroe. As a result, the entire city was forced to evacuate. Although an estimated 25 water rescues were performed in Woodloch, no storm-related deaths were reported.

== See also ==
- List of municipalities in Texas
