= New Caney, Texas =

Coordinates: 30°09′19″N 95°12′41″W

New Caney
- Unincorporated community
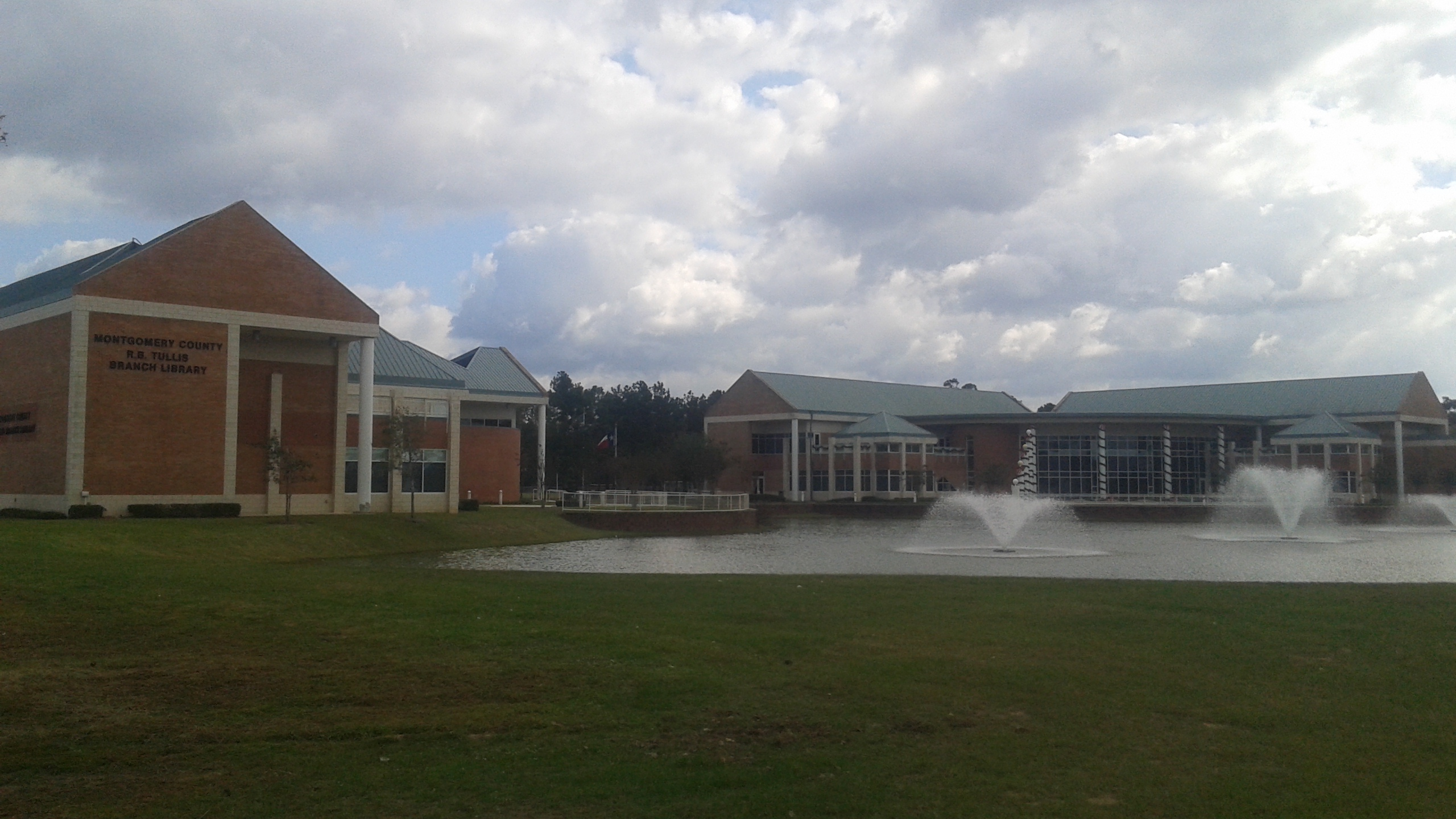
- R.B. Tullis Library and East Montgomery County Chamber of Commerce in New Caney.
- Interactive map of New Caney
- Country: United States
- State: Texas
- County: Montgomery

Population (2010)
  - Total: 19,987
- Zip code: 77357

New Caney is an unincorporated community in Montgomery County, Texas, United States, located within the Houston–Pasadena–The Woodlands metropolitan area. As of 2010, the population of the New Caney area is 19,987. New Caney had an estimated population in 2016 of roughly 22,000.

== History ==
New Caney was established in 1862 under the name Presswood, named for pioneers Austin and Sarah Waters Presswood. Captain John Robertson and other settlers followed, and cattle ranches, mills, and stores were opened along Caney Creek. In 1877, the town received a railroad from the East and West Texas Railway, and Caney Station became a shipping point for imports and exports, bringing more business to the area. In 1882, Presswood received its first post office, registered under the name New Caney, as the name Caney already was in use by another Texas town. This development led to the name of Presswood falling out of use, as New Caney became the preferred term.

In 1884, the population of New Caney was 60 people. By 1892, it had grown to 150 residents and was able to support several general stores. Throughout the 20th century, the community continued to expand.

== Government and infrastructure ==
The New Caney area is administered by the Montgomery County Commissioner, Precinct 4. The current county commissioner is James Metts.

In the Texas Senate, New Caney is in District 4, represented by Republican Brandon Creighton. In the Texas House of Representatives, part of New Caney is in District 3, represented by Republican Cecil Bell Jr.; the rest is in District 16, represented by Republican Will Metcalf.

In the United States Senate, the entire state is represented by John Cornyn and Ted Cruz. In the United States House of Representatives, New Caney is in District 2, represented by Republican Dan Crenshaw.

The USPS New Caney Post Office is located at 20811 U.S. Highway 59 (which is now Interstate 69) and the ZIP code is 77357.

New Caney's Fire and EMS protection is provided by a joint effort of the East Montgomery County Fire Department ESD#7 and the Montgomery County Hospital District.

Law-enforcement services are provided by the Montgomery County Sheriff's Office, Montgomery County Constable Department Precinct 4, and the New Caney ISD Police Department.

== Education ==
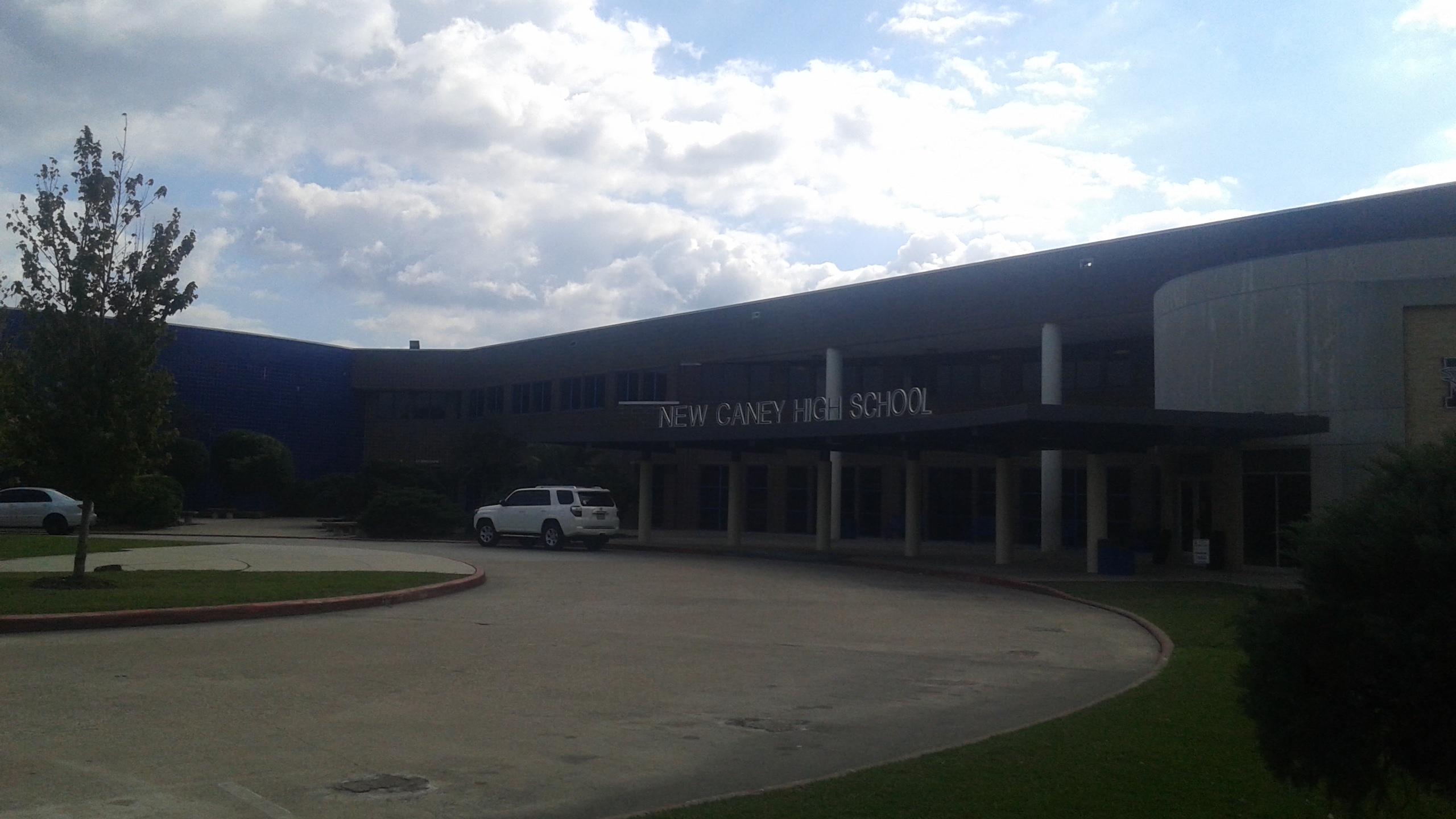
New Caney High School, New Caney ISD.

Public schools are operated by the New Caney Independent School District. New Caney High School is the district high school. New Caney residents also have the option to attend Infinity Early College High School.

The New Caney Independent School District area joined the North Harris Montgomery Community College District, now Lone Star College, area in 1981. The Texas Legislature designated New Caney ISD as part of Lone Star.

Montgomery County Memorial Library System operates the R. B. Tullis Branch Library at 21569 US 59 (I-69 / Eastex Freeway).

== Notable people ==
- Shawn Barber - Olympic pole vaulter originally from Las Cruces, New Mexico
- Robert L. Crippen (captain, US Navy, Ret.) - former NASA astronaut - originally from Beaumont, Texas

== Climate ==
The climate in this area is characterized by hot, humid summers and generally mild to cool winters. According to the Köppen climate classification, New Caney has a humid subtropical climate, Cfa on climate maps.
