= New Caney High School =

Public school in Texas, United States

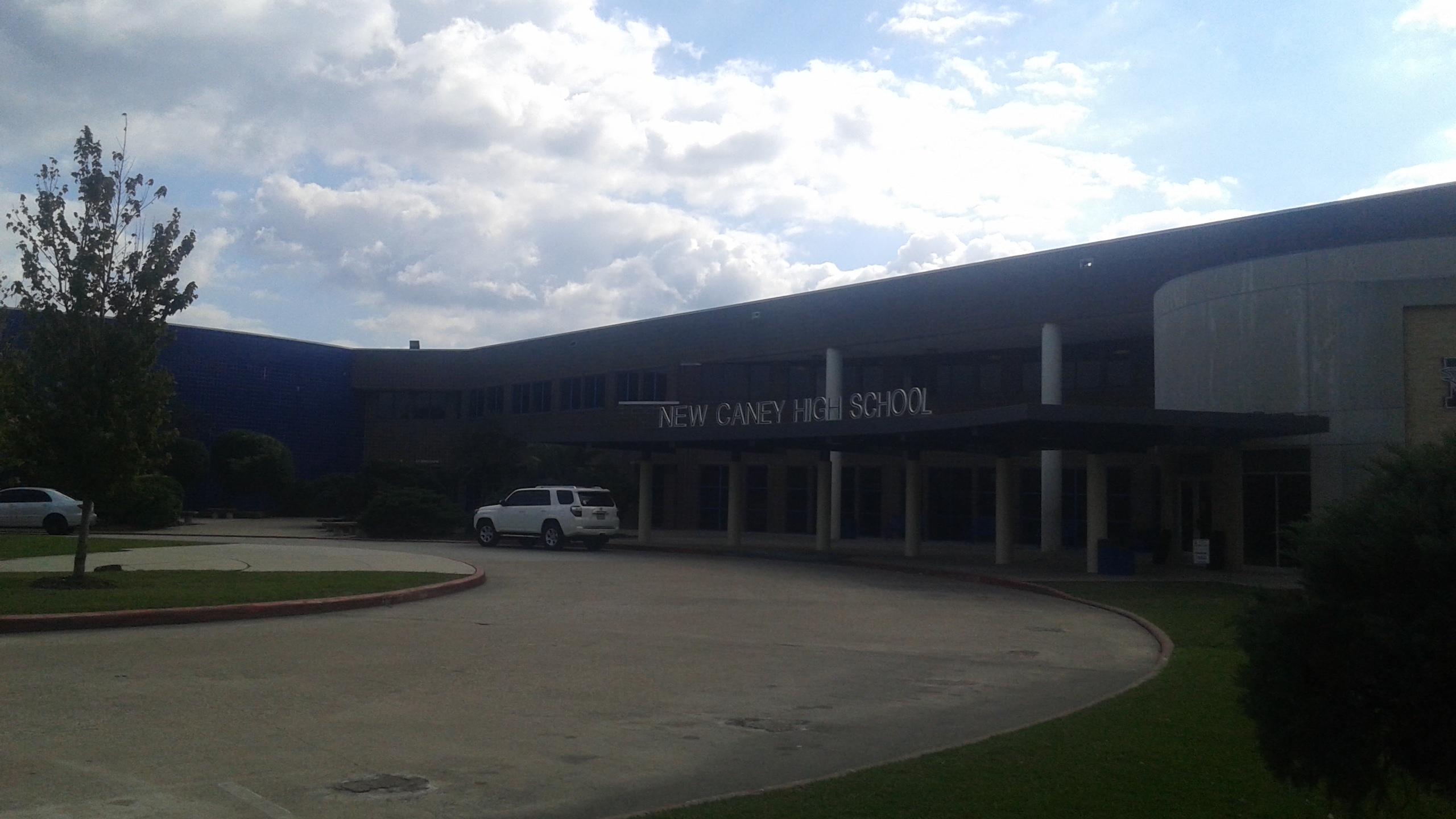

Location
- 21650 Loop 494; New Caney, Texas 77357; United States; 30.13248°N 95.22178°W

Information
- School type: Public high school
- Motto: Eagles Fly Strong and Proud
- Established: 1938
- School district: New Caney Independent School District
- Principal: Amber Beard
- Faculty: 137.04 (on an FTE basis)
- Grades: 9-12
- Enrollment: 2,226 (2024–2025)
- Student to teacher ratio: 16.24
- Colors: Blue & White
- Athletics conference: UIL Class AAAAA
- Mascot: American bald eagle
- Team name: Eagles
- Website: New Caney High School

New Caney High School is a public secondary school in New Caney and is a part of the New Caney Independent School District. NCHS is currently a 5A school. The school has received recognition for its JROTC program, band, journalism program, DECA program and Academic Decathlon team.

New Caney High School offers Advanced Placement courses, athletics, career and technology courses, dual credit, National Honor Society, and a host of special programs.

== History ==
New Caney ISD became an independent school district in 1938. The high school, named New Caney High School, had a total of nine students in its first graduating class. That original building is still in use as the district's "The Learning Center" alternative school, and as the NCISD police department and emergency operations center.

NCHS was located at on the southbound side of Interstate 69 in Porter until the building burned down in the 1980s. The campus was moved to its current New Caney location in 1987. The former Porter building was converted into New Caney Middle School, and is now Pine Valley Middle School.

== Demographics ==
In the 2021-2022 school year, there were 2,245 students enrolled at New Caney High School. The ethnic distribution of students was as follows:

- 4.4% African American
- 0.3% American Indian
- 0.7% Asian
- 64.1% Hispanic
- 0.1% Pacific Islander
- 28.3% White
- 2% Two or More Races

69.3% of students were eligible for free or reduced-price lunch. The school was eligible for Title I funding.

== Academics ==
For each school year, the Texas Education Agency rates school performance using an A–F grading system based on statistical data. For the 2024-25 school year, the school received an overall rating of "C".

In the Class of 2021, 93.2% of students received their high school diplomas on time or earlier. The dropout rate for students in grades 9-12 was 1% during the 2020-2021 school year.

The average SAT score at New Caney High School was 1045 for 2020-2021 graduates. The average ACT score was 16.5.

Two middle schools (grades 6-8) feed into New Caney High School: Pine Valley Middle School (partially) and Keefer Crossing Middle School.

== Notable alumni ==
- Zion Childress - NFL safety for the Dallas Cowboys
- Robert Crippen - Former NASA astronaut
- Adam Dunn - Professional baseball player for the Chicago White Sox
- Jason "Sundance" Head - Season 11 winner of The Voice
