= Farm to Market Road 149 =

Road in Texas, United States

Farm to Market Road 149

Route information
- Maintained by TxDOT
- Length: 48.238 mi (77.632 km)
- Existed: 1945–present

Major junctions
- South end: FM 1774 in Pinehurst
- SH 249 Toll in Pinehurst; SH 105 in Montgomery; SH 90 in Anderson
- West end: FM 3090 west of Anderson

Location
- Country: United States
- State: Texas
- Counties: Montgomery, Grimes

Highway system
- Highways in Texas; Interstate; US; State; Former; Toll; Loops; Spurs; FM/RM; Park; Rec
← FM 148	→ RM 150

Farm to Market Road 149 (FM 149) is a farm to market road in the U.S. state of Texas. It runs approximately 48.3 miles (77.7 km) in Montgomery and Grimes counties, connecting the cities of Montgomery and Anderson.

== Route description ==
FM 149 has a southern terminus in Pinehurst at the former north end of SH 249, where that road (prior to December 2019) transitioned into FM 1774 toward Magnolia. The route travels north through unincorporated Montgomery County before entering the city of Montgomery, where it crosses SH 105. FM 149 then passes to the west of Lake Conroe and enters the Sam Houston National Forest, where it begins to turn to the west. The highway crosses into Grimes County, where it is signed as a west–east route, and passes through Richards before turning to the southwest. In the county seat of Anderson, FM 149 has a one-block concurrency with SH 90 before resuming its westward course. FM 149 ends at an intersection with FM 3090 approximately 4 miles (6.4 km) west of Anderson.

=== Spur route ===
FM 149 has one spur route, FM Spur 149, in Montgomery County. The spur route is approximately 1.4 miles (2.3 km) in length, and allows movement between northbound FM 149 and eastbound FM 1488. This spur also connects to Dobbin–Hufsmith Road, which terminates at FM 2978 just north of Hufsmith.

== History ==
FM 149 was created on April 20, 1945 as a short spur between Anderson and Richards inside Grimes County. Later that year, it was extended twice, to the Montgomery County line on June 6, 1945 and to Deckers Prairie ten days later. The designation was extended down the Tomball Road to US 75 (later I-45) in Houston on July 22, 1949. On October 31, 1957, the route was extended beyond Anderson to its current western terminus at FM 244 (now FM 3090). The section from FM 2430 (now West Montgomery Road) to US 75 was transferred to FM 2430 on December 10, 1959, while FM 149 was rerouted north over the former route of FM 2430. A spur connection to FM 1488 was added on November 1, 1968 which replaced the old route of FM 149 because one section of the old route was transferred to FM 1488. The road was truncated to its current length on October 28, 1988, when the section from the southern terminus at Interstate 45 to FM 1774 was transferred to SH 249.

== Major intersections ==
County	Location	mi	km	Destinations	Notes
Montgomery	Pinehurst	0.0	0.0	FM 1774 – Magnolia, Tomball	Southern terminus; former northern terminus of SH 249
Montgomery	Pinehurst	0.8	1.3	SH 249 Toll (Aggie Expressway)	Interchange
Montgomery		2.2	3.5	FM Spur 149 north	
Montgomery	Mostyn	4.1	6.6	FM 1488 – Magnolia, Conroe	Interchange
Montgomery	Montgomery	15.7	25.3	SH 105 – Navasota, Conroe	
Montgomery	Montgomery	16.8	27.0	FM 1097 east – Willis	South end of FM 1097 concurrency
Montgomery		17.3	27.8	FM 1097 west	North end of FM 1097 concurrency
Montgomery	Sam Houston National Forest	26.1	42.0	FM 1375 – New Waverly	
Montgomery	Sam Houston National Forest	27.6	44.4	FM 1791 – Huntsville	
Grimes	Richards	33.6	54.1	FM 1486 south – Dacus	East end of FM 1486 concurrency
Grimes		34.3	55.2	FM 1486 north – Shiro	West end of FM 1486 concurrency
Grimes		38.6	62.1	FM 2562	
Grimes	Anderson	43.8	70.5	Loop 429	
Grimes	Anderson	43.8	70.5	SH 90 north – Madisonville	East end of SH 90 concurrency
Grimes	Anderson	43.8	70.5	SH 90 south – Navasota	West end of SH 90 concurrency
Grimes		48.3	77.7	FM 3090 – Navasota, Piedmont	Western terminus
1.000 mi = 1.609 km; 1.000 km = 0.621 mi: Concurrency terminus; Electronic toll collection
