= Texas State Highway 30 =

State highway in Texas

State Highway 30

Route information
- Maintained by TxDOT
- Length: 53.16 mi (85.55 km)
- Existed: December 15, 1960–present

Major junctions
- West end: Bus. SH 6 in College Station
- SH 6 in College Station; SH 90 in Roans Prairie; I-45 / US 190 in Huntsville; SH 75 in Huntsville
- East end: SH 19 in Huntsville

Location
- Country: United States
- State: Texas
- Counties: Brazos, Grimes, Walker

Highway system
- Highways in Texas; Interstate; US; State; Former; Toll; Loops; Spurs; FM/RM; Park; Rec
← I-30	→ SH 31

State Highway 30 (SH 30) runs from Business SH 6-R in College Station via Roans Prairie to SH 19 in Huntsville. It is known as Harvey Road between Business SH 6-R and FM 158 in College Station, as 11th Street between I-45 and US 190 (Phelps Drive) in Huntsville, and as Riverside Drive east of US 190 (Phelps Drive) in Huntsville.

The current version of SH 30, the second route with that designation, was established in 1960. The previous designation existed from 1917 to 1939, when it was replaced with US 277.

== History ==
=== Previous routes ===
Historic SH 30

SH 30 was a route proposed on October 8, 1917, to run from Wichita Falls to Abilene. On December 18, 1917, an intercounty highway from Abilene to Paint Rock was designated. On August 19, 1918, the intercounty highway became part of SH 30. On April 23, 1919, the road was extended to Sabinal. On August 21, 1923, the southern portion was rerouted into Del Rio on August 21, 1923, over part of SH 7A and SH 4. The old route became part of rerouted SH 23, with the section south of Menard cancelled. That same day, SH 30 extended to the Oklahoma state line, replacing a portion of SH 2. On March 17, 1924, SH 30 extended to the Mexico border. On September 26, 1939, the highway was cancelled as U.S. Route 277 was routed over its entirety from Del Rio to Wichita Falls.

=== Current route ===
The current iteration of SH 30 was designated on December 15, 1960, replacing SH 45 and parts of FM 60 and FM 158 to avoid confusion with I-45. On May 21, 1979, SH 30 was extended from I-45 to SH 19, replacing part of SH 19, which was rerouted over former Loop 405.

== Future ==
SH 30 may be part of the future Interstate 14 corridor as the highway has a more direct route between Bryan–College Station and Huntsville over US 190.

== Major junctions ==
County	Location	mi	km	Destinations	Notes
Brazos	College Station	0.00	0.00	Bus. SH 6 (Texas Avenue) – Texas A&M University, George Bush Library, Downtown Bryan	
Brazos	College Station	1.42	2.29	SH 6 (Earl Rudder Freeway South)	Interchange; future I-14
Brazos	College Station	3.79	6.10	FM 158 west / Elmo Weedon Road – Downtown Bryan	
Grimes	Carlos	17.05	27.44	FM 244 – Iola, Anderson	Interchange
Grimes	Roans Prairie	25.07	40.35	SH 90 – Bedias, Madisonville, Anderson, Navasota	
Grimes	Roans Prairie	25.65	41.28	FM 2562 south / County Road 173	
Grimes	Shiro	29.11	46.85	FM 1486 south – Richards	
Grimes		31.66	50.95	FM 2620 north	
Walker		39.78	64.02	FM 3179 south / Davis Road	
Walker		42.90	69.04	FM 2550 north	
Walker		47.71	76.78	FM 1791	Interchange
Walker	Huntsville	50.25	80.87	I-45 / US 190 west	I-45 exit 116; west end of US 190 overlap
Walker	Huntsville	51.05	82.16	SH 75 north – Madisonville	West end of SH 75 overlap
Walker	Huntsville			FM 247 north (Avenue M) – Midway	
Walker	Huntsville	51.51	82.90	SH 75 south (Sam Houston Avenue)	East end of SH 75 overlap
Walker	Huntsville	52.16	83.94	US 190 east (11th Street) – Livingston	East end of US 190 overlap
Walker	Huntsville	53.10	85.46	SH 19	Interchange
Walker	Huntsville	53.84	86.65	FM 2821	
Walker	Huntsville	54.66	87.97	SH 19	
1.000 mi = 1.609 km; 1.000 km = 0.621 mi: Concurrency terminus
