= Anderson-Shiro High School =

Public school in Texas, United States

Coordinates: 30.485085°N 96.002169°W

Anderson-Shiro Jr./Sr. High School

Location
- 1345 FM 149; Anderson, Texas 77830; United States

Information
- School type: Public high school
- School district: Anderson-Shiro Consolidated Independent School District
- Principal: Kimberly Niedermeier
- Teaching staff: 43.03 (FTE)
- Grades: 6-12
- Enrollment: 506 (2023-2024)
- Student to teacher ratio: 11.76
- Colors: Royal blue and white
- Athletics conference: UIL Class 3A
- Mascot: Hooty the Owl (Female)
- Nickname: Owls
- Website: Anderson-Shiro High School

Anderson-Shiro High School is a public secondary school located in Anderson, Texas, United States and classified as a 3A school by the UIL. It is part of the Anderson-Shiro Consolidated Independent School District located in Grimes County, Texas. In 2017, the school was rated "Met Standard" by the Texas Education Agency.

== Athletics ==
Anderson-Shiro High School participates in these sports -

Cross Country, Football, Volleyball, Basketball, Golf, Track, Tennis, Powerlifting, Baseball & Softball.

=== State Titles ===
- Baseball -
  - 2006(1A)

==== State Finalist ====
- Boys Basketball -
  - 1996(1A)

== Other school activities ==
Anderson-Shiro also has a Theatre class that performs during the spring semester, and has an art/ceramics program, a band program, FFA, FCA, NHS, NJHS, and FBLA.

The Choir program is exclusively Jr. High currently, but there are plans to extend it to high school in the coming years.

The High school band program competes in UIL marching and Concert/Sight Reading competitions,

A chapter of FBLA was established during the 2018–2019 school year.

NJHS (National Junior Honor Society)

FCA (Fellowship of Christian Athletes) is held during tutorial periods.
