= Brazos Valley station =

Planned high-speed rail stop in Texas

Brazos Valley

General information
- Location: Texas State Highway 30; Roans Prairie, Texas
- Coordinates: 30.588452°N 95.952049°W
- Line: Texas Central Railway

Construction
- Parking: 1200 spaces

Planned service
Preceding station	Texas Central Railway	Following station
Dallas Terminus	Texas Central Railway	Houston Terminus
Location
- Location within Texas

Brazos Valley is a planned rail station on the Texas Central Railway high-speed line between Dallas and Houston. It is located in Roans Prairie, Texas, northeast of the intersection of Texas State Highway 90 and Texas State Highway 30 in the Brazos Valley. A shuttle bus is expected to provide service to Texas A&M University.
