= Texas State Highway 75 =

State highway in Texas

State Highway 75
- SH 75 highlighted in red

Route information
- Maintained by TxDOT
- Length: 132.63 mi (213.45 km)
- Existed: 1987–present

Major junctions
- South end: Loop 336 in Conroe
- US 190 / SH 30 in Huntsville; I-45 / FM 1791 in Huntsville; US 190 / SH 21 in Madisonville; US 79 in Buffalo; US 84 in Fairfield
- North end: FM 246 near Streetman

Location
- Country: United States
- State: Texas

Highway system
- Highways in Texas; Interstate; US; State; Former; Toll; Loops; Spurs; FM/RM; Park; Rec
← US 75	→ SH 75A

State Highway 75 (SH 75) is a 132.63-mile-long (213.45 km) state highway in the U.S. state of Texas. It follows the former routing of U.S. Route 75 (US 75), which was supplanted by Interstate 45 south of Dallas, except in Dallas, where the former US 75 is now SH 310, and through Ferris, Palmer, Ennis, and Corsicana, where the old highway is signed as a business route of I-45. The route was designated in 1987.

== Route description ==
The southern terminus of the route is in Conroe, where it merges into Interstate 45 at the southern side of Loop 336. The northern terminus is approximately three miles north of Streetman, in the southern section of Navarro County, where it becomes the east side frontage road for I-45.

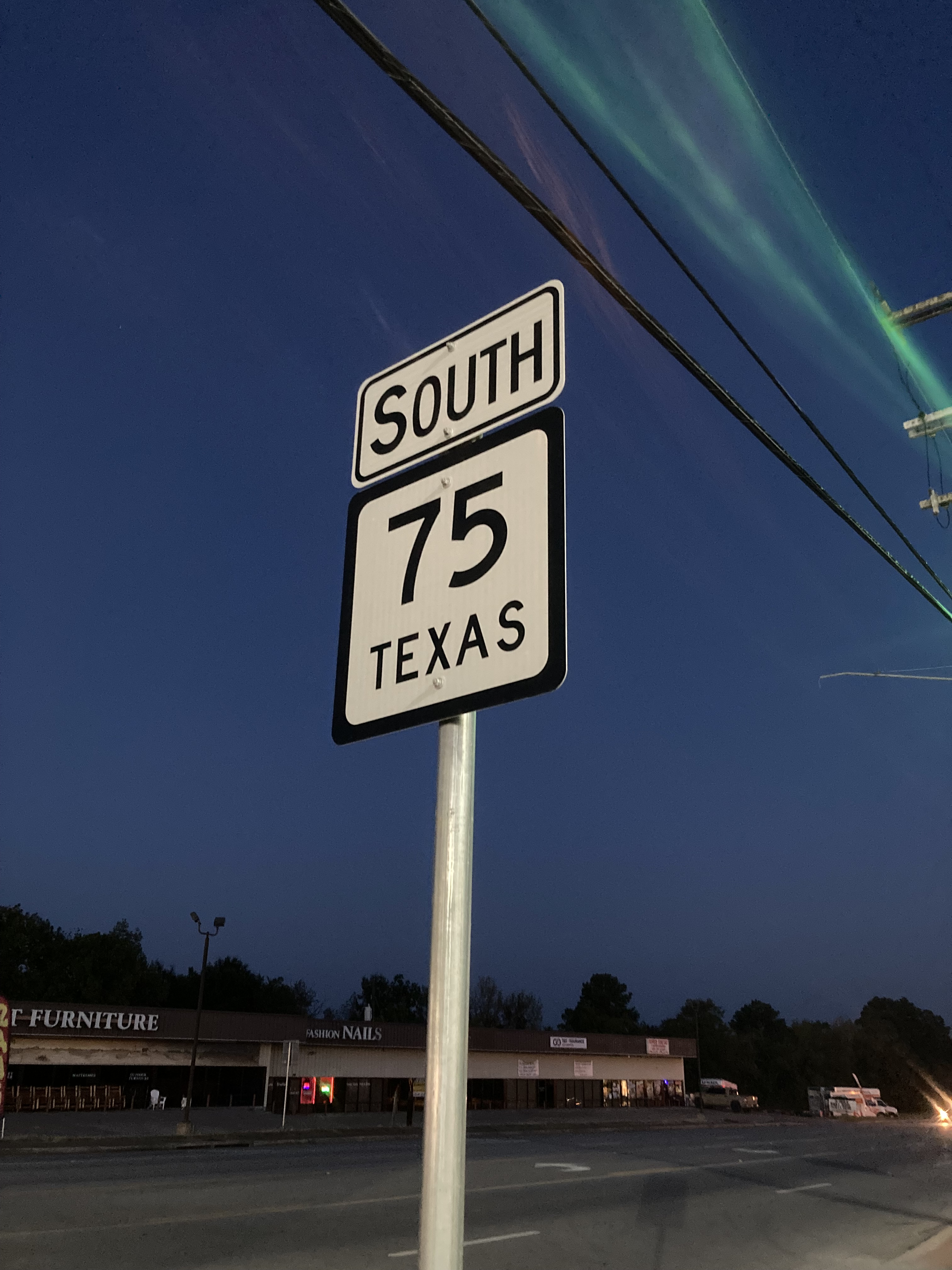
A SH 75 South shield seen in Willis, Texas

== Previous routes ==
SH 75 was previously designated on August 21, 1923 to replace SH 13A from Goodnight east to the Oklahoma state line. On May 19, 1924, the section from Goodnight to Jericho was cancelled. SH 75 was instead extended west to Washburn. By 1927 it was running concurrently with the newly designated U.S. Highway 66, and was cancelled on September 26, 1939. The current route was designated on January 28, 1987, replacing part of US 75 which was decommissioned south of Dallas.

== Related routes ==
North of Dallas, US 75 was rerouted onto Central Expressway, one of the first expressway projects in the United States, in the 1950s. Its original route from Richardson to Howe (south of Sherman) was redesignated as State Highway 5.

== Junction list ==
County	Location	mi	km	Destinations	Notes
Montgomery	Conroe			I-45 / Loop 336 – Houston, Dallas	
Montgomery	Conroe			FM 2854 west – Montgomery	
Montgomery	Conroe			SH 105 – Montgomery, Cleveland	
Montgomery	Conroe			Loop 336	
Montgomery	Conroe			FM 3083 – Montgomery County Airport	
Montgomery	Conroe			FM 830 – Lake Conroe	
Montgomery	Willis			FM 2432 east	
Montgomery	Willis			FM 1097 west – Lake Conroe	South end of FM 1097 overlap
Montgomery	Willis			FM 1097 east	North end of FM 1097 overlap
Walker	New Waverly			FM 1375 west	
Walker	New Waverly			SH 150 east – Shepherd	South end of SH 150 overlap
Walker	New Waverly			SH 150 west	North end of SH 150 overlap
Walker				FM 2793 south	
Walker				FM 2296 north	
Walker				PR 40 – Huntsville State Park	
Walker	Huntsville			SH 19 – Trinity	
Walker	Huntsville			FM 1374 south	
Walker	Huntsville			US 190 east / SH 30 east – Livingston	South end of US 190/SH 30 overlap
Walker	Huntsville			US 190 west / SH 30 west – Madisonville, College Station	North end of US 190/SH 30 overlap
Walker	Huntsville			FM 2821 east	
Walker	Huntsville			I-45 / FM 1791 south	
Walker				FM 1696 west – Bedias	South end of FM 1696 overlap
Walker				FM 1696 east	North end of FM 1696 overlap
Madison				Spur 67 east	
Madison				Spur 104 north	
Madison	Madisonville			SH 90 south – Navasota	
Madison	Madisonville			US 190 / SH 21 – Bryan, Crockett	
Madison				I-45	
Madison				SH OSR – Normangee, Midway	
Leon	Leona			FM 977 – Flynn	
Leon	Centerville			SH 7 – Marquez, Crockett	
Leon				FM 1618 east	
Leon				FM 831 north – Oakwood	
Leon				FM 2539 south	
Leon	Buffalo			US 79 – Jewett, Oakwood	
Leon	Buffalo			SH 164 west – Groesbeck	
Freestone	Dew			SH 179 west – Teague	
Freestone	Dew			FM 489	
Freestone	Fairfield			US 84 – Teague, Palestine	
Freestone				FM 2547 north	
Freestone				FM 833	
Freestone				FM 1079 east	
Freestone				Spur 114 west	
Freestone				FM 3059 east / Loop 262 west – Streetman	
Freestone	Streetman			FM 416 east – Richland Chambers Reservoir	
Freestone	Streetman			Loop 262 east – Streetman	
Freestone				I-45 south / FM 246 – Dallas, Corsicana, Houston	
1.000 mi = 1.609 km; 1.000 km = 0.621 mi: Concurrency terminus
