= Roans Prairie, Texas =

- Unincorporated community
- Interactive map of Roans Prairie, Texas
- Country: United States
- State: Texas
- County: Grimes

Population (2000)
  - Total: 56
- Time zone: UTC-6 (Central (CST))
  - Summer (DST): UTC-5 (CDT)
- Postal code: 77875
- Area code: 936

Roans Prairie (or Roan's Prairie) is an unincorporated community in Grimes County, in east central Texas, United States. State Highways 30 and 90 intersect here, seventeen miles northeast of Navasota in central Grimes County.

== Education ==
Public education in the community of Roans Prairie is provided by the Anderson-Shiro Consolidated Independent School District.

== High Speed Rail ==
Roans Prairie is the planned location of the Brazos Valley station, one of the three stations part of Texas Central Railway high-speed line between Dallas and Houston. The station is meant to serve Texas A&M University and Sam Houston State University. The project has faced resistance from residents doubting the economic benefit and fearing eminent domain. The project is due to be done in 2026.
