= O.L. Luther Unit =

Men's state prison in Navasota, Texas, U.S.

Coordinates: 30°15′44″N 96°03′26″W

- Interactive map of O.L. Luther Unit
- Location: 1800 Luther Drive Navasota, Texas
- Status: open
- Security class: G1, G2, G3, Outside Trusty
- Capacity: 1316 (1,102 in unit, plus 214 in trusty camp)
- Opened: July 1982
- Managed by: Texas Department of Criminal Justice
- Warden: Debra Booker

The O.L. Luther Unit is a state prison for men located in Navasota, Grimes County, Texas, owned and operated by the Texas Department of Criminal Justice. This facility was opened in July 1982, and has a maximum capacity of 1316: 1102 in the unit itself, and another 214 in the trusty camp.

Luther is co-located with the state's Wallace Pack Unit, with its own population of about 1500 prisoners. Prisoners of both facilities cooperate in an extensive agricultural operation on 11,000 acres, including horses, a cow/calf operation, grain processing and storage, and a buffalo ranch.

== Incidents ==
In October 2001, inmate Nathan Essary was sexually abused by a corrections officer, sued, and discovered other inmate victims of the same officer. Their official complaints had been ignored. Essary collected "substantial" money damages in a civil case, as well as a payment from the state and the officer's beach house.

In 2011, within a six-month period, two Luther guards were caught, fired, arrested, and charged with felonies related to bribery and smuggling.
