= National Register of Historic Places listings in Grimes County, Texas =

Location of Grimes County in Texas

This is a list of the National Register of Historic Places listings in Grimes County, Texas.

This is intended to be a complete list of properties and districts listed on the National Register of Historic Places in Grimes County, Texas. There are two districts and four individual properties listed on the National Register in the county. Three individually listed properties are Recorded Texas Historic Landmarks. Both districts contain several more Recorded Texas Historic Landmarks with one district also holding a State Historic Site and two State Antiquities Landmarks.

This National Park Service list is complete through NPS recent listings posted March 21, 2025.

== Current listings ==
The publicly disclosed locations of National Register properties and districts may be seen in a mapping service provided.

	Name on the Register	Image	Date listed	Location	City or town	Description
1	Anderson Historic District	Anderson Historic District	March 15, 1974 (#74002072)	Anderson and environs 30°29′02″N 95°59′08″W	Anderson	Includes State Historic Site, State Antiquities Landmarks, numerous Recorded Texas Historic Landmarks
2	Foster House	Foster House	September 8, 1980 (#80004123)	E of Navasota on TX 90; 30°24′33″N 96°03′00″W	Navasota	Recorded Texas Historic Landmark
3	Navasota Commercial Historic District	Navasota Commercial Historic District	November 30, 1982 (#82001737)	Roughly bounded by La Salle, Holland, 9th, and Brule Sts. 30°23′15″N 96°05′23″W	Navasota	Includes Recorded Texas Historic Landmarks
4	P. A. Smith Hotel	P. A. Smith Hotel	April 16, 1976 (#76002036)	111 Railroad St. 30°23′14″N 96°05′22″W	Navasota	Part of Navasota Commercial Historic District
5	Piedmont Springs Archeological Site	Piedmont Springs Archeological Site	July 29, 1982 (#82004506)	Address restricted	Anderson	Recorded Texas Historic Landmark
6	Steele House	Steele House	June 13, 1978 (#78002939)	217 Brewer St. 30°23′20″N 96°05′03″W	Navasota	Recorded Texas Historic Landmark

== See also ==
- National Register of Historic Places listings in Texas
- List of Texas State Historic Sites
- Recorded Texas Historic Landmarks in Grimes County
