= Apolonia, Texas =

Unincorporated community in Texas, US

Coordinates: 30°29′36″N 95°54′36″W

Apolonia is an unincorporated community in Grimes County, in the U.S. state of Texas.

== History ==
A post office was established at Apolonia in 1889, and remained in operation until 1907. Apolonia was originally built up chiefly by Polish Roman Catholics, who named the community after Saint Apollonia.
