= Houston station (Texas Central) =

Planned high-speed rail terminus in the United States

Houston

General information
- Location: Houston, Texas
- Coordinates: 29.7992°N 95.4541°W
- Line: Texas Central Railway

Planned service
Preceding station	Texas Central Railway	Following station
Brazos Valley toward Dallas	Texas Central Railway	Terminus
Location
- Location within Texas

Houston is the planned southern terminus of the Texas Central Railway high-speed line. The station is located in the Lazybrook/Timbergrove neighborhood of Houston, Texas, northeast of the Interstate 610 and U.S. Route 290 interchange at the site of the former Northwest Mall. The station is about 1.5 miles (2.4 km) from the METRO Northwest Transit Center and about 8 miles (13 km) from Downtown.

== Planning ==
Three alternatives were considered for the Houston passenger terminal: the former Northwest Mall, the industrial site directly southwest of the mall, and the nearby METRO Northwest Transit Center. The mall was chosen as the station site in 2018.
