= Texas State Highway 90 =

State highway in Texas

State Highway 90
- SH 90 highlighted in red

Route information
- Maintained by TxDOT
- Length: 42.07 mi (67.71 km)
- Existed: 1923–present

Major junctions
- South end: SH 6 / SH 105 at Navasota
- SH 30 at Roans Prairie
- North end: SH 75 at Madisonville

Location
- Country: United States
- State: Texas

Highway system
- Highways in Texas; Interstate; US; State; Former; Toll; Loops; Spurs; FM/RM; Park; Rec
← US 90	→ SH 91

State Highway 90 (SH 90) is a state highway that runs 42 miles (68 km) between Madisonville, Texas and Navasota. It was originally designated by 1933 along its current route, except that it extended southwest from Navasota to Brenham. This section was transferred to SH 105 in 1973.

== History ==
Historic SH 90

The routing between Madisonville and Navasota was originally set before the state's highway system was started. By 1919, a rail route between the cities existed, run by the Great Northern Railroad. By 1922, a basic highway had been built between the cities (designated October 20, 1919 from Buffalo southwest via Jewett and Normangee to Navasota; rerouted on July 20, 1920 to the Madisonville to Navasota route), which was designated as State Highway 32A, which branched off the main State Highway 32 in Madisonville. On August 21, 1923, the state roads department had begun to get rid of most suffixed spur routes, so this route was again renumbered as State Highway 90. By 1926, it extended to Brenham, replacing a portion of State Highway 105. The route remained a minimally serviced dirt road until the early 1930s, when paving occurred. Numerous reroutings occurred during the next 70 years, including being rerouted away from the town of Washington on February 24, 1953 (the old route through Washington was redesignated as FM 912) and the eventual transferral of the section between Brenham and Navasota back to State Highway 105 on February 28, 1973. On April 18, 1985, SH 90 was rerouted over Spur 174 to US 75, with the old route north to SH 21/US 190 becoming part of Spur 174.

== Route description ==
SH 90 begins at an intersection northeast of Navasota with State Highway 6 and State Highway 105. The route travels to the northeast, first passing Navasota High School. It then travels through the western side of Anderson, passing a block west of the Grimes County Courthouse. It continues north out of Anderson through central Texas farmlands. It reaches Roans Prairie and an intersection with State Highway 30. It continues north through Bedias and other lightly populated sections of Grimes County before entering Madison County. The route enters Madisonville from the south, reaching an intersection with South Street. It turns east at South Street, reaching its northern terminus two blocks later at State Highway 75 (formerly US Route 75), while State Spur 174 continues northward from South Street to an intersection with US Route 190 and State Highway 21.

== Junction list ==
County	Location	mi	km	Destinations	Notes
Grimes	Navasota			SH 6 / SH 105	
Grimes				FM 3455	
Grimes				FM 1774	
Grimes				FM 149	
Grimes				FM 244	
Grimes	Roans Prairie			SH 30	
Grimes				FM 39	
Grimes	Bedias			Loop 361 / FM 1696	
Madison				FM 1452	
Madison	Madisonville			Spur 174	
Madison	Madisonville			SH 75	
1.000 mi = 1.609 km; 1.000 km = 0.621 mi
