= Wallace Pack Unit =

Prison in Grimes County, Texas

- Interactive map of Wallace Pack Unit
- Location: Navasota, Texas; 30°19′28″N 96°06′23″W
- Status: Operational
- Security class: G1-G3, Administrative Segregation, Outside Trusty
- Capacity: Unit: 1,157; Trusty Camp: 321
- Opened: September 1983
- Managed by: TDCJ Correctional Institutions Division
- Warden: Timothy Fitzpatrick
- Website: Official website

The Wallace Pack Unit (P1) is a Texas Department of Criminal Justice (TDCJ) prison in unincorporated Grimes County, Texas, 5 miles (8.0 km) south of Navasota. It is along Farm to Market Road 1227, in proximity to Houston.

== History ==
It opened in September 1983 and is named after Wallace Pack, warden of Ellis Unit who was drowned in self-defense by a prisoner there in 1981.

As of 2014 the prison has hundreds of elderly prisoners above the age of 60. In 2014 Jeff Edwards, an Austin civil rights lawyer, filed a lawsuit against the TDCJ on behalf of Pack Unit prisoners. They argue that the unit's temperature is at dangerous levels and that it needs to be lowered to 88 °F (31 °C). The suit was filed at a federal courthouse in Houston. The four plaintiffs have disabilities and medical conditions amplified by extreme heat. They compared cell blocks to ovens and argued that tables are too hot to touch. Prisoners also complained about the water provided in the prison, stating that it has arsenic. In June 2016 a federal judge ruled that the prison must provide safe drinking water.

A settlement to provide air conditioning was reached in 2018.

== Notable prisoners ==
- Keith Robert Turner - perpetrator of the 2006 Harris County, Texas hate crime assault
- Royce Zeigler - perpetrator of the Murder of Riley Ann Sawyers
- John Bernard Feit - Former Catholic priest convicted in 2018 of the murder of former schoolteacher and beauty queen Irene Garza, his former parishioner.
- William Neil Gallagher - an American Christian radio host who stole $23 million from over 190 people in a Ponzi scheme over the course of a decade. His victims ages ranged from 62 to 91. He was sentenced to life in prison for numerous financial crimes and made to pay $10 million in restitution.
- Don Steven McDougal - Serving life without parole for the Murder of Audrii Cunningham
- Karmelo Anthony - Serving 35 years with the possibility for parole for his Murder of Austin Metcalf.
