= Anderson-Shiro Consolidated Independent School District =

School district in Texas, United States

Address
- 458 FM 149 West ESC Region 6 Anderson, Grimes County, Texas, 77830; United States
- Coordinates: 30°29′17″N 95°59′38″W

District information
- Type: Independent school district
- Motto: Building Champions ... Whatever it Takes
- Grades: Pre-K through 12
- Established: 1970; 56 years ago
- Superintendent: Sarah Borowicz
- Schools: 2
- NCES District ID: 4808230

Students and staff
- Students: 966 (2023–2024)
- Teachers: 76.86 (on an FTE basis) (2023–2024)
- Staff: 60.50 (on an FTE basis) (2023–2024)
- Student–teacher ratio: 12.57 (2023–2024)
- Athletic conference: UIL Class 3A Football Division II
- District mascot: Fighting Owls
- Colors: Midnight Blue, White

Other information
- TEA District Accountability Rating for 2011-12: Recognized
- Website: https://www.ascisd.net/

Anderson-Shiro Consolidated Independent School District (ASCISD) is a public school district based in Anderson, Texas (USA). In addition to Anderson, the district also serves the community of Shiro as well as rural areas in central Grimes County. The district operates a combined junior/senior high school, Anderson-Shiro Jr./Sr. High School, and one elementary school, Anderson-Shiro Elementary School.

With the bond achieved in 2024, there is the new Elementary School being built down the hillside of the High-School. Students are estimating it will be completed by summer or shortly after.

== Finances ==
As of the 2010–2011 school year, the appraised valuation of property in the district was $449,666,000. The maintenance tax rate was $0.104 and the bond tax rate was $0.039 per $100 of appraised valuation.

== Academic achievement ==
In 2011, the school district was rated "recognized" by the Texas Education Agency. Thirty-five percent of districts in Texas in 2011 received the same rating. No state accountability ratings will be given to districts in 2012. A school district in Texas can receive one of four possible rankings from the Texas Education Agency: Exemplary (the highest possible ranking), Recognized, Academically Acceptable, and Academically Unacceptable (the lowest possible ranking).

Historical district TEA accountability ratings

- 2011: Recognized
- 2010: Exemplary
- 2009: Recognized
- 2008: Academically Acceptable
- 2007: Academically Acceptable
- 2006: Academically Acceptable
- 2005: Academically Acceptable
- 2004: Recognized

== Schools ==
In the 2011–2012 school year, the district had students in two schools.

- Anderson-Shiro Jr./Sr. High School (Grades 6–12)
- Anderson-Shiro Elementary (Grades PK-5)

== Athletics ==
Anderson-Shiro High School participates in the following sports:

- Boys—Football, Basketball, and Cross-Country for fall sports; Baseball, Golf, Tennis, Powerlifting and Track for spring sports.
- Girls—Basketball, Volleyball and Cross-Country for fall sports; Softball, Golf, Tennis, Powerlifting and Track for spring sports.

Anderson-Shiro Junior High school participates in the following sports:

- Boys- Football (7th and 8th), Basketball (7th and 8th), and Cross-Country (Together) for fall sports; Baseball, and Track & Field for spring sports.
- Girls- Volleyball (7th and 8th)Basketball (7th and 8th), and Cross-Country (Together) for fall sports; Newly added (as of 2025-26 school year) Softball (One team.) and Track & Field for spring sports.

The 2006 boys baseball team won the 1A state championship.

== See also ==
- List of school districts in Texas
- List of high schools in Texas
