= Shiro, Texas =

- Census-designated place
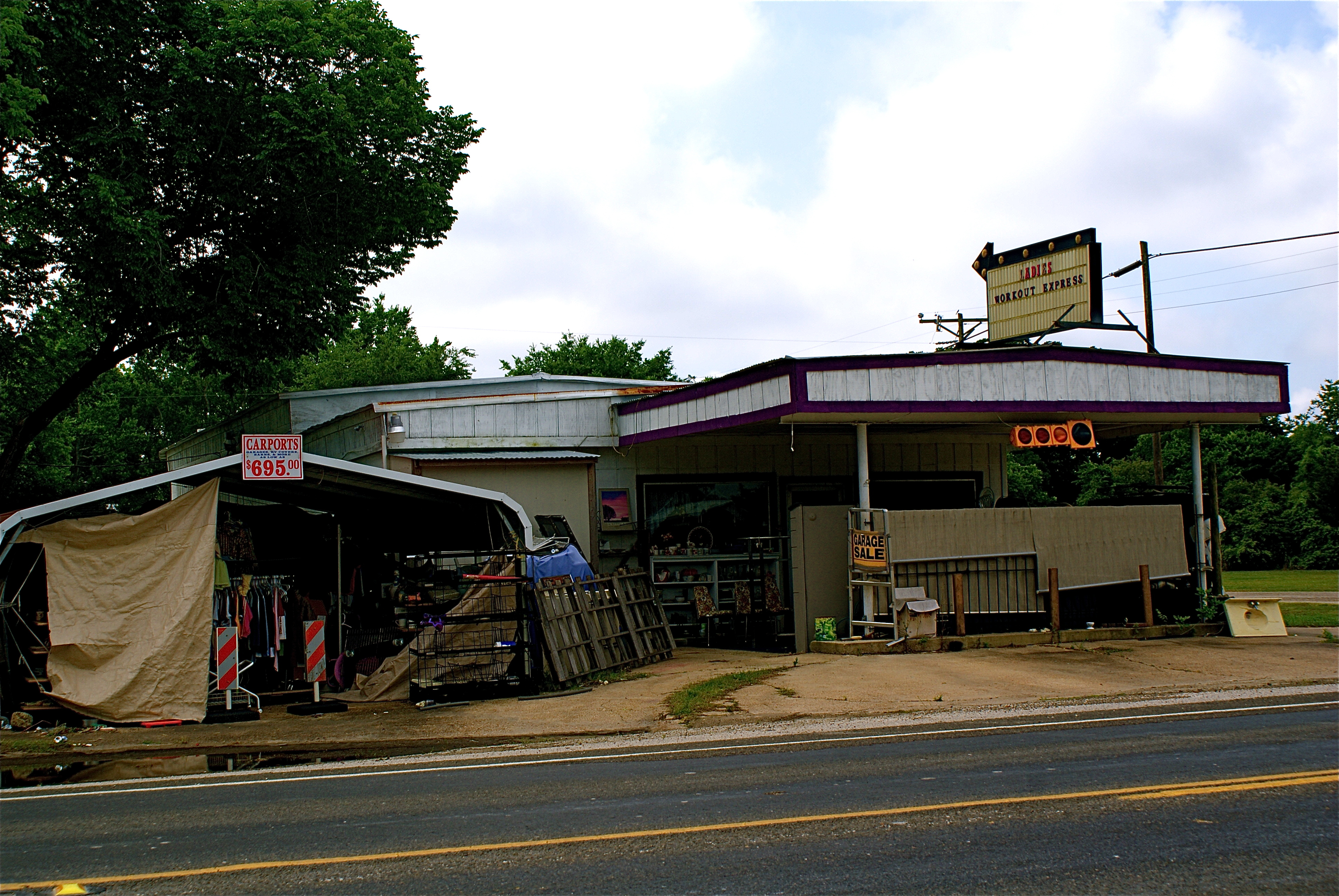
- Roadside tire shop in Shiro

- Location within the state of Texas Shiro (the United States)
- Coordinates: 30°36′31″N 95°53′11″W
- Country: United States
- State: Texas
- County: Grimes
- Elevation: 341 ft (104 m)

Population (2020)
  - Total: 201
- Time zone: UTC-6 (Central (CST))
  - Summer (DST): UTC-5 (CDT)
- Postal code: 77876
- Area code: 936
- GNIS feature ID: 2805784

Shiro is an unincorporated community and census-designated place (CDP) in Grimes County, Texas, United States located on State Highway 30 and the BNSF Railway in east central Grimes County. As of the 2020 census, Shiro had a population of 201.

== Education ==
Public education in the community of Shiro is provided by the Anderson-Shiro Consolidated Independent School District. The district has two campuses, Anderson-Shiro Elementary School (grades PK-5) and Anderson-Shiro Junior/Senior High School (grades 6–12)

== Demographics ==
Historical population
Census	Pop.	Note	%±
2020	201		—
U.S. Decennial Census; 1850–1900 1910; 1920 1930 1940; 1950 1960 1970; 1980 1990 2000; 2010 2020

Shiro first appeared as a census designated place in the 2020 U.S. census.

=== 2020 census ===
Shiro CDP, Texas – Racial and ethnic composition Note: the US Census treats Hispanic/Latino as an ethnic category. This table excludes Latinos from the racial categories and assigns them to a separate category. Hispanics/Latinos may be of any race.
Race / Ethnicity (NH = Non-Hispanic)	Pop 2020	% 2020
White alone (NH)	139	69.15%
Black or African American alone (NH)	28	13.93%
Native American or Alaska Native alone (NH)	0	0.00%
Asian alone (NH)	0	0.00%
Native Hawaiian or Pacific Islander alone (NH)	0	0.00%
Other race alone (NH)	0	0.00%
Mixed race or Multiracial (NH)	2	1.00%
Hispanic or Latino (any race)	32	15.92%
Total	201	100.00%
