= Anderson, Texas =

Anderson
- City
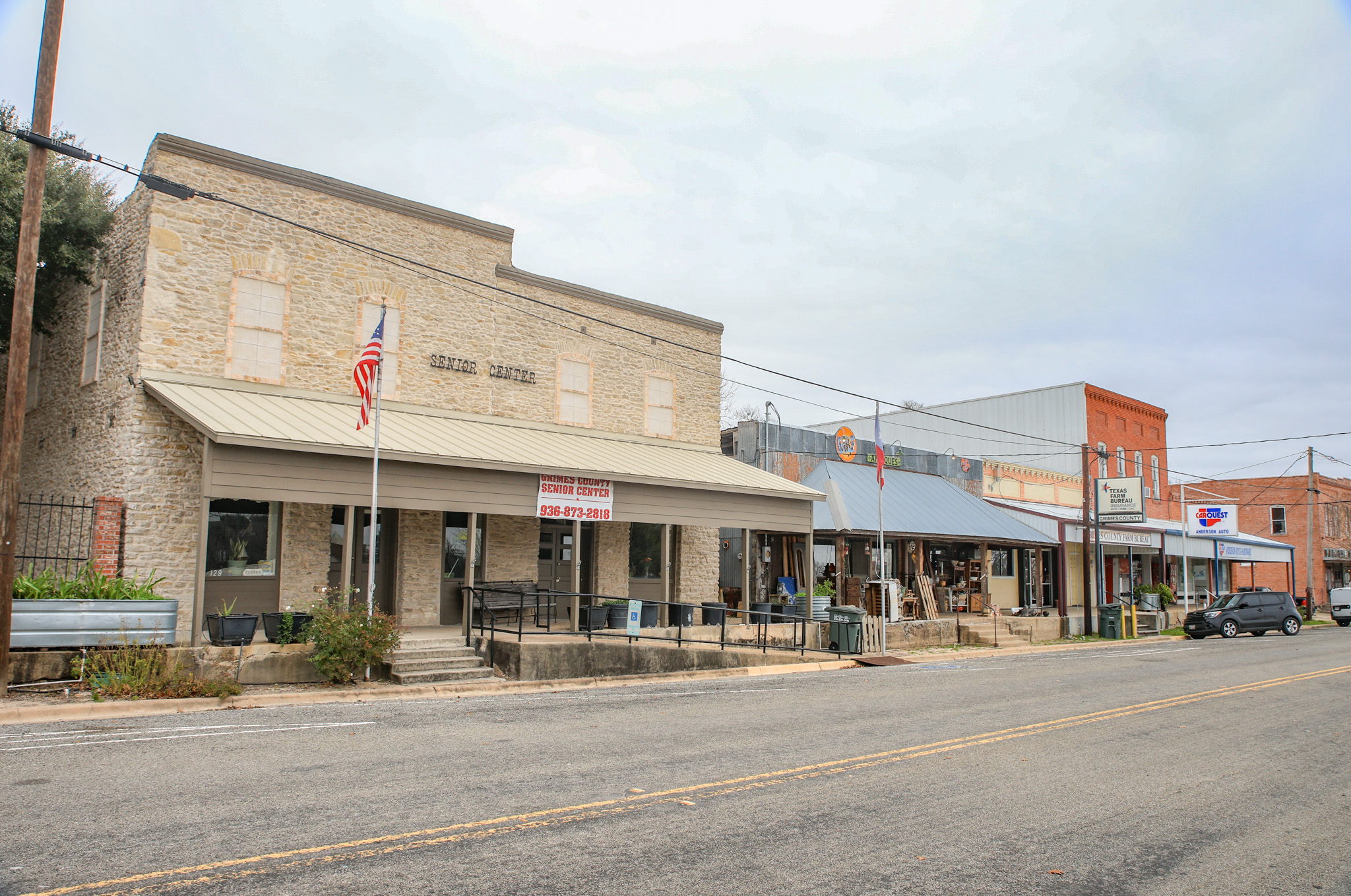
- Anderson, Texas
- Interactive map of Anderson
- Location within Texas Location within the United States
- Coordinates: 30°29′14″N 95°59′24″W
- Country: United States
- State: Texas
- County: Grimes
- Established: 2003

Government
  - Mayor: Kason Menges
  - Mayor Pro-Tem: Tanner Krause
  - Secretary: Kason Menges

Area
  - Total: 0.51 sq mi (1.33 km^{2})
  - Land: 0.51 sq mi (1.33 km^{2})
  - Water: 0 sq mi (0.00 km^{2})
- Elevation: 335 ft (102 m)

Population (2020)
  - Total: 193
  - Density: 472.8/sq mi (182.55/km^{2})
- Time zone: UTC-6 (Central (CST))
  - Summer (DST): UTC-5 (CDT)
- ZIP codes: 77830, 77875
- Area code: 936
- FIPS code: 48-03192
- GNIS feature ID: 2409707
- Website: http://andersontx.gov/

Anderson is a city in and the county seat of Grimes County, Texas, United States. The population was 193 as of the 2020 census. The town and its surroundings are listed on the National Register of Historic Places as the Anderson Historic District.

The town is named for Kenneth Lewis Anderson, a vice-president of the Republic of Texas, who died here at the Fanthorp Inn in 1845.

== History ==
Long occupied by indigenous peoples, this area was initially settled by Europeans and creole Spanish during Spanish colonial rule. Anglo-Americans began to enter the area in the 1820s from the Southern United States. After Mexico achieved independence, it accepted additional settlers from the United States into eastern Texas. It allowed them to practice their own religion, if they swore loyalty to Mexico. A few structures in town date from this period.

Texas achieved independence in 1836 and settlers continued to arrive from the United States. As they came mostly from the South and brought slaves with them, Grimes and other eastern counties had the highest proportion of slaveholders and slaves in the republic.

Grimes County was organized in 1846, soon after the Republic of Texas was annexed by the United States. Henry Fanthorp, a new Anglo-American settler in Texas, offered land for the county seat. The town grew quickly between 1846 and 1885, reaching a peak population of about 3,000 people. County population was majority-black and enslaved by 1860. The black majority continued until many African Americans left during the 20th century in the Great Migration, to leave behind Jim Crow conditions.

Anderson in 1859 rejected being connected to the Texas and Central Railroad, and was soon surpassed in population and economic growth by Navasota. Anderson could not catch up again, although it accepted a railroad in 1903. The town was incorporated, but records show elected officials only for the years 1867 and 1875.

In 1983 a movement to revive city government was defeated at the polls. In 1995, the town began having major sewer problems and the state threatened to shut down the county courthouse if the problems were not fixed. One solution was to incorporate the town again so that it would be eligible for grants to acquire a sewer system. In 1995, John Freeman was elected as the first mayor, and the town was incorporated in 1998. He retired in 2003 and Gail Sowell was elected as mayor.

== Geography ==
Texas State Highway 90 passes through the city, leading north 7 miles (11 km) to Roans Prairie and southwest 9 miles (14 km) to Navasota, the largest city in Grimes County. College Station is 28 miles (45 km) to the northwest, and Houston is 71 miles (114 km) to the southeast.

According to the United States Census Bureau, Anderson has a total area of 0.50 square miles (1.3 km^{2}), all land.

=== Climate ===
The climate in this area is characterized by hot, humid summers and generally mild to cool winters. According to the Köppen Climate Classification system, Anderson has a humid subtropical climate, abbreviated "Cfa" on climate maps.

== Demographics ==
Historical population
Census	Pop.	Note	%±
1990	370		—
2000	257		−30.5%
2010	222		−13.6%
2020	193		−13.1%
U.S. Decennial Census 1990 data from TSHA Online

=== 2020 census ===
As of the 2020 census, Anderson had a population of 193, with 77 households and 58 families residing in the city. The median age was 35.9 years. 28.5% of residents were under the age of 18 and 18.7% of residents were 65 years of age or older. For every 100 females there were 112.1 males, and for every 100 females age 18 and over there were 91.7 males age 18 and over.

0% of residents lived in urban areas, while 100.0% lived in rural areas.

There were 77 households in Anderson, of which 44.2% had children under the age of 18 living in them. Of all households, 44.2% were married-couple households, 15.6% were households with a male householder and no spouse or partner present, and 29.9% were households with a female householder and no spouse or partner present. About 18.2% of all households were made up of individuals and 11.7% had someone living alone who was 65 years of age or older.

There were 104 housing units, of which 26.0% were vacant. Among occupied housing units, 70.1% were owner-occupied and 29.9% were renter-occupied. The homeowner vacancy rate was 5.1% and the rental vacancy rate was <0.1%.

Anderson racial composition as of 2020 (NH = Non-Hispanic) (Note: Note: the US Census treats Hispanic/Latino as an ethnic category. This table excludes Latinos from the racial categories and assigns them to a separate category. Hispanics/Latinos can be of any race.)
Race	Number	Percentage
White (NH)	117	60.62%
Black or African American (NH)	52	26.94%
Some Other Race (NH)	1	0.52%
Mixed/Multi-Racial (NH)	3	1.55%
Hispanic or Latino	20	10.36%
Total	193	

Racial composition as of the 2020 census
Race	Percent
White	65.3%
Black or African American	27.5%
American Indian and Alaska Native	0%
Asian	0%
Native Hawaiian and Other Pacific Islander	0%
Some other race	2.6%
Two or more races	4.7%
Hispanic or Latino (of any race)	10.4%

=== 2000 census ===
As of the 2000 census, there were 257 people, 92 households, and 59 families residing in the city. The population density was 498.6 inhabitants per square mile (192.5/km^{2}). There were 119 housing units at an average density of 230.8 per square mile (89.1/km^{2}). The racial makeup of the city was 54.86% White, 40.47% African American, 0.78% Native American, 2.72% from other races, and 1.17% from two or more races. Hispanic or Latino of any race were 4.67% of the population.

There were 92 households, out of which 21.7% had children under the age of 18 living with them, 46.7% were married couples living together, 14.1% had a female householder with no husband present, and 34.8% were non-families. 32.6% of all households were made up of individuals, and 17.4% had someone living alone who was 65 years of age or older. The average household size was 2.35 and the average family size was 2.95.

In the city, the population was spread out, with 17.9% under the age of 18, 7.8% from 18 to 24, 30.7% from 25 to 44, 29.6% from 45 to 64, and 14.0% who were 65 years of age or older. The median age was 42 years. For every 100 females, there were 112.4 males. For every 100 females age 18 and over, there were 129.3 males.

The median income for a household in the city was $33,409, and the median income for a family was $34,375. Males had a median income of $24,135 versus $22,188 for females. The per capita income for the city was $14,718. About 8.3% of families and 11.0% of the population were below the poverty line, including 9.1% of those under the age of eighteen and 21.1% of those 65 or over.

== Arts and culture ==
=== Anderson Historic District ===
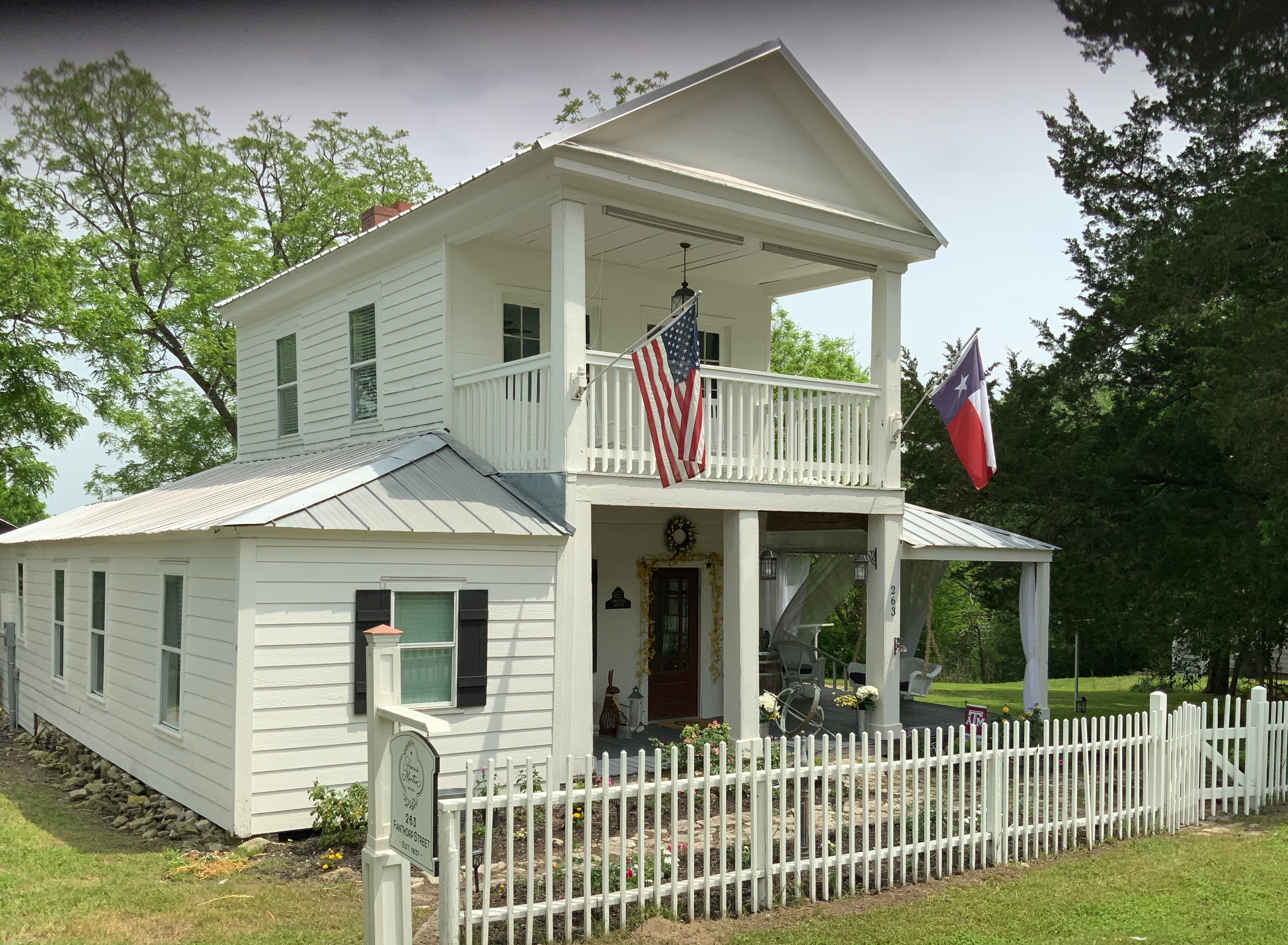
Harris-Martin House

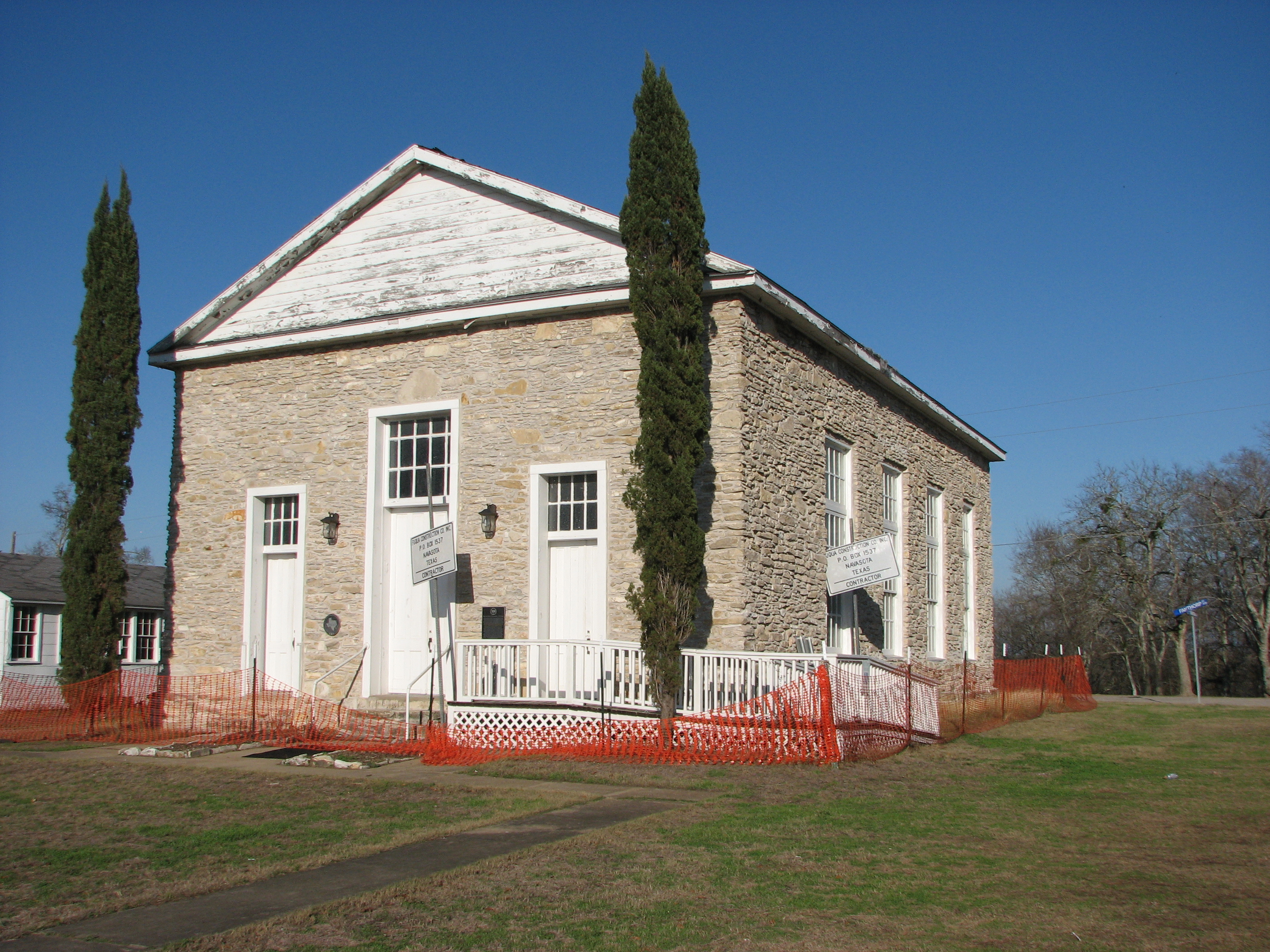
Anderson Baptist Church

The entire town and surrounding areas has been recognized as the Anderson Historic District, listed on the National Register of Historic Places in 1974. The area was originally settled during Spanish colonial rule. The town is unusual in that a large number of structures have survived that reflect the history of Texas from the Mexican period through the years of the Republic of Texas and into early statehood. Anderson has never fully recovered from economic decline suffered during the late nineteenth century. As a result, the town's appearance has been largely unchanged since the beginning of the twentieth century.

Some buildings within the district are listed as Texas State Antiquities Landmarks or Recorded Texas Historic Landmarks. Sites include:

- Allen Home, built around 1840 and first served as a girls' academy.
- Anderson Baptist Church, built between 1853 and 1855 from native stone by enslaved African-American laborers and artisans. The Baptist General Convention of Texas was organized here in 1848.
- Rueben Bennett House.
- H. H. Boggess House.
- Fanthorp Inn State Historic Site. Held the region's first post office. In 1845, Vice President Kenneth Lewis Anderson of the Republic of Texas, after whom the town is named, died while staying at the inn. The Texas Parks and Wildlife Department acquired the property in 1977 and, opened the site to the public in 1987 as a demonstration of life at a stagecoach stop and family home in 1850.
- B. B. Goodrich House. Benjamin Briggs Goodrich served as a member of the Convention of 1836 and signed the Texas Declaration of Independence and the Constitution of the Republic of Texas.
- The Harris-Martin House. Harris followed his parents, John R. Harris and Jane Harris, to Texas, who preceded him to found the colony of Harrisburg, Texas (now in modern Houston).
- Grimes County Courthouse.
- Steinhagen Log Cabin.
- Vernacular Palladian House.

== Government ==
Kason Menges has served as mayor since 2025.

== Education ==
Public education in the city of Anderson is provided by the Anderson-Shiro Consolidated Independent School District.
