= Bedias, Texas =

- City
- Motto: "My Hometown & Your Hometown Too."
- Interactive map of Bedias, Texas
- Coordinates: 30°46′45″N 95°56′49″W
- Country: United States
- State: Texas
- County: Grimes

Area
  - Total: 1.12 sq mi (2.89 km^{2})
  - Land: 1.11 sq mi (2.87 km^{2})
  - Water: 0.012 sq mi (0.03 km^{2})
- Elevation: 318 ft (97 m)

Population (2020)
  - Total: 361
  - Density: 424.6/sq mi (163.94/km^{2})
- Time zone: UTC-6 (Central (CST))
  - Summer (DST): UTC-5 (CDT)
- ZIP Code: 77831
- Area code: 936
- FIPS code: 48-07144
- GNIS feature ID: 2409811
- Website: bedias.com

Bedias (/ˈbiːdaɪs/ BEE-dysse) is a city in Grimes County, Texas, United States at the intersection of State Highway 90 and Farm Roads 1696 and 2620, 30 miles (48 km) northeast of Navasota in northeastern Grimes County. It was incorporated as a city in 2003 and had a population of 361 at the 2020 census.

== Demographics ==
Historical population
Census	Pop.	Note	%±
2010	443		—
2020	361		−18.5%
U.S. Decennial Census

=== 2020 census ===
As of the 2020 census, Bedias had a population of 361. The median age was 46.8 years. 21.3% of residents were under the age of 18 and 26.6% of residents were 65 years of age or older. For every 100 females there were 92.0 males, and for every 100 females age 18 and over there were 85.6 males age 18 and over.

0% of residents lived in urban areas, while 100.0% lived in rural areas.

There were 144 households in Bedias, of which 23.6% had children under the age of 18 living in them. Of all households, 38.9% were married-couple households, 18.1% were households with a male householder and no spouse or partner present, and 37.5% were households with a female householder and no spouse or partner present. About 27.8% of all households were made up of individuals and 20.1% had someone living alone who was 65 years of age or older.

There were 188 housing units, of which 23.4% were vacant. Among occupied housing units, 90.3% were owner-occupied and 9.7% were renter-occupied. The homeowner vacancy rate was 3.0% and the rental vacancy rate was 22.2%.

Racial composition as of the 2020 census
Race	Percent
White	64.3%
Black or African American	15.2%
American Indian and Alaska Native	0.8%
Asian	0.3%
Native Hawaiian and Other Pacific Islander	0.3%
Some other race	7.5%
Two or more races	11.6%
Hispanic or Latino (of any race)	17.2%

== Education ==
Bedias and the surrounding area are served by the Madisonville Consolidated Independent School District.

== Climate ==
The climate in this area is characterized by hot, humid summers and generally mild to cool winters. According to the Köppen Climate Classification system, Bedias has a humid subtropical climate, abbreviated "Cfa" on climate maps.
