= Grimes County, Texas =

County in Texas, United States

- County
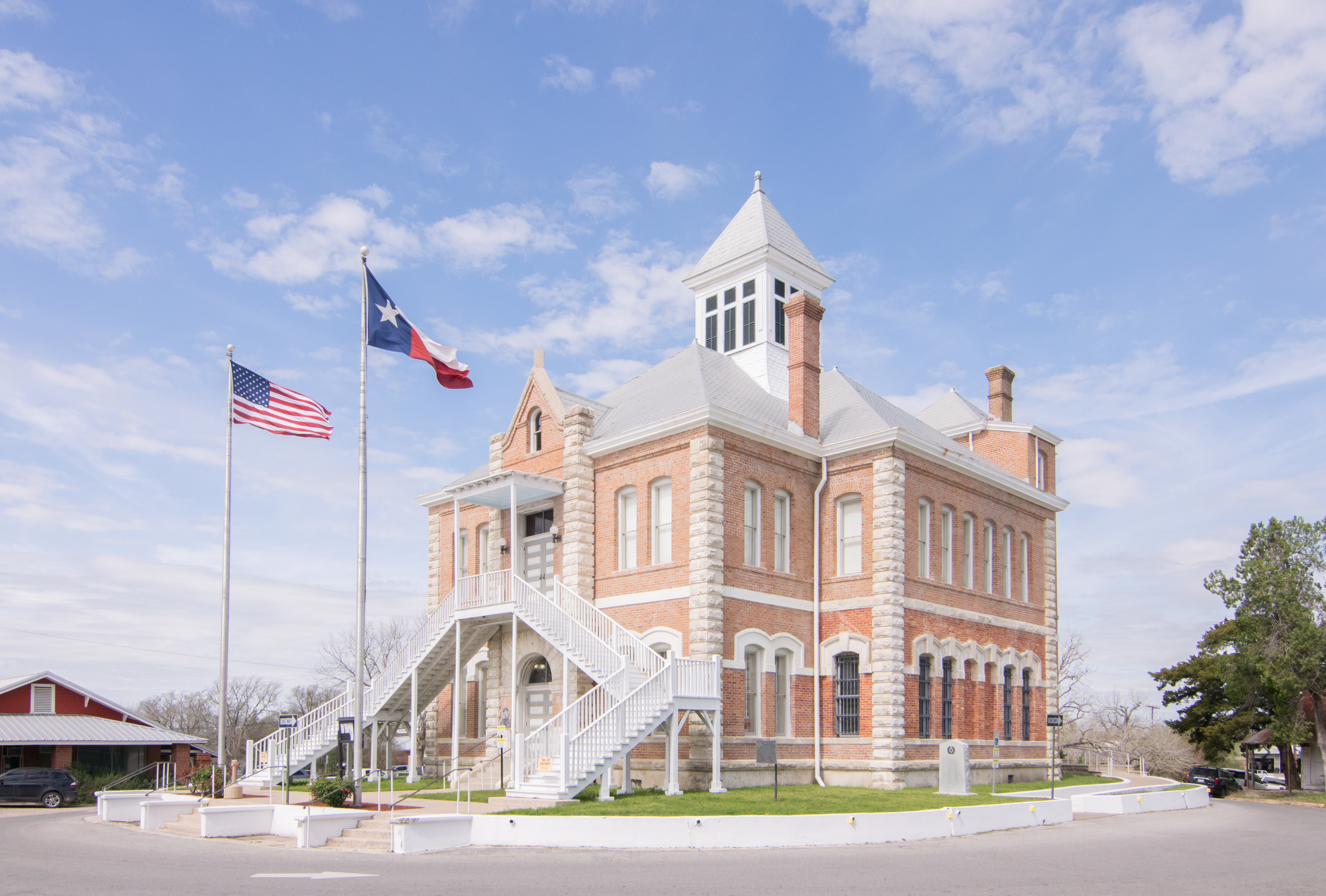
- The Grimes County Courthouse in Anderson

- Flag

- Location within the U.S. state of Texas
- Coordinates: 30°33′N 95°59′W
- Country: United States
- State: Texas
- Founded: 1846
- Named for: Jesse Grimes
- Seat: Anderson
- Largest city: Navasota

Area
  - Total: 802 sq mi (2,080 km^{2})
  - Land: 787 sq mi (2,040 km^{2})
  - Water: 14 sq mi (36 km^{2}) 1.8%

Population (2020)
  - Total: 29,268
  - Estimate (2025): 34,252 ▲
  - Density: 37.2/sq mi (14.4/km^{2})
- Time zone: UTC−6 (Central)
  - Summer (DST): UTC−5 (CDT)
- Congressional district: 10th
- Website: grimescountytexas.gov

Grimes County is a county located in southeastern Texas, United States. As of the 2020 census, its population was 29,268. The seat of the county is Anderson. The county was formed from Montgomery County in 1846. It is named for Jesse Grimes, a signer of the Texas Declaration of Independence and early European-American settler of the county.

The Navasota and Brazos Rivers form the western boundary of the county. Eastern areas of the county are part of the watershed of the San Jacinto River.

== History ==
In the historic period, French and Spanish explorers encountered the Bidai Indians, who were mentioned in Spanish records from 1691. Like other tribes, they suffered high fatalities from new infectious diseases caught from the Spanish and joined with the remnants of other Native American people later in the historic period.

The area had very little settlement by Europeans or creole Spanish during the century of Spanish colonial rule, but after Mexico gained its independence, it invited settlers from the United States to come to eastern Texas. They were allowed to practice their own religion, as long as they swore loyalty to the Mexican government.

A few historic buildings in Anderson, such as the Fanthorp Inn, date from this period, as well as some from the Republic of Texas and the early statehood years. So, the town and nearby area have been designated the Anderson Historic District, which is listed on the National Register of Historic Places.

Anglo-American migration to what became Grimes County began in the 1820s, when it was part of Mexico. Early settlers were primarily from the South, especially Alabama, and many brought enslaved African Americans with them to work the land. The first cotton gin in Texas was built by Jared E. Groce, who arrived with 90 slaves and developed a cotton plantation near today's Hempstead, Texas.

Texas achieved its independence in 1836, and settlers arrived in greater numbers from the United States. The fertile lowlands were initially used for cotton plantations, especially in the late antebellum period.

Grimes County was organized in 1846, one year after the Republic of Texas was annexed by the United States by treaty. From 1850 to the Civil War, the White population steadily increased, since the newcomers continued to bring slaves, the African American population increased even faster. Planters continued to grow cotton and corn as commodity crops. By 1860, 4,852 White inhabitants were in the county, plus 5,468 slaves, who made up 53% of the population. The White population had doubled in the preceding decade, while the slave population had tripled. Grimes had a total of 505 slaveholding families in 1860, with 77 owning 20 slaves or more, that number considered the minimum for major planters. It was one of 17 counties in the state where slaveholders held, on average, more than 10 slaves each.

In such conditions, Whites were anxious after the emancipation of slaves, and also struggled with adapting to a free labor market. White violence rose after the war, and the Ku Klux Klan established a local chapter in 1868 to assert dominance. Federal troops were stationed in the area and the Freedman's Bureau had an office in the county. They were not successful in protecting freedmen, but the bureau established schools in the area.

Determined to crush Populist efforts and alliances with Republicans that resulted in victories in 1896 and 1898, White Democrats formed what became the White Man's Union, a secret, oath-bound organization that violently took over elections in 1900, after killing several Black Populist leaders. It selected all county officials until 1958.

White violence continued after Reconstruction and into the early 20th century, when Whites committed 9 lynchings of Blacks in the county, part of racial terrorism to suppress the freedmen. Grimes and Freestone Counties had the same number of lynchings in this period, ranking as the fifth-highest totals in a state where lynchings were widespread and conducted in many counties. The economy declined in the late 19th century, increasing social tensions.

In 1859, the Houston and Texas Central Railroad extended its line into the county. Anderson, the county seat, rejected it and was bypassed for Navasota, which soon surpassed Anderson in size. Anderson finally got a railroad in the early 1900s, but never caught up with Navasota. In the late 19th and 20th centuries, the Burlington Northern Santa Fe and the Union Pacific became the major railroads in the county.

In response to the violence and takeover by the White Man's Union, African Americans began to leave the county in large numbers. The population of the county declined markedly from 1900 to 1920, and after 1930 to 1980. These were periods of the Great Migration, as African Americans left Texas and other parts of the South to leave behind the oppression of Jim Crow and disenfranchisement, and seek better work. From 1940 on, many migrated to the West Coast for jobs in the expanding defense industry. Rural Whites also left the South for industrial cities.

== Economy ==
The county remained mostly rural and agricultural until the late 20th century, which contributed to continuing population losses. Timber harvesting and processing were part of early industry in the 20th century, but livestock raising and dairy farms contributed more to the overall agricultural economy in the late 20th century, making up 93% of its revenues. In addition, crops have become more diversified. Railroad restructuring in the late 20th century resulted in mergers among some lines. In the 21st century, State Highway 90 is the major north–south thoroughfare, and State Highways 30 and 105 run east–west. With some new manufacturing, population beginning to increase since the late 1970s. Its location adjacent to the Bryan-College Station metropolitan area has also contributed to growth.

In 2014, the census estimated 27,172 people living in Grimes County. About 59.5% were Anglo, 22.6% were Hispanic, and 16.5% were African American.

On June 3, 2026, Grimes County commissioners approved a full property tax abatement package to create incentives to attract SpaceX's Terafab semiconductor manufacturing complex to the area, in the vicinity of Gibbons Creek Reservoir, originally built for the now-decommissioned Gibbons Creek Steam Electric Station. The project is an estimated $55 billion initial investment aimed at producing advanced chips for the company’s growing artificial intelligence business. The total cost could reach $119 billion and could employ 1800 people. At the time of the county approval, Terafab was publicly described as partnership between SpaceX and Tesla with both companies investing in the facility, where the semiconductor chips produced would be used in Tesla products (both in vehicles and robots) and for buildout of SpaceX orbital data centers, with the facility characterized as "vertically integrated" under SpaceX's leadership.

== Geography ==
According to the U.S. Census Bureau, the county has a total area of 802 square miles (2,080 km^{2}), of which 14 sq mi (36 km^{2}) (1.8%) are covered by water.

=== Major highways ===
- State Highway 6
- State Highway 30
- State Highway 90
- State Highway 105
- State Highway 249 or Aggie Expressway
- Loop 361
- Loop 424
- Spur 234
- Spur 515

=== Adjacent counties ===
- Madison County (north)
- Walker County (northeast)
- Montgomery County (southeast)
- Waller County (south)
- Washington County (southwest)
- Brazos County (west)

== Demographics ==
Historical population
Census	Pop.	Note	%±
1850	4,008		—
1860	10,307		157.2%
1870	13,218		28.2%
1880	18,603		40.7%
1890	21,312		14.6%
1900	26,106		22.5%
1910	21,205		−18.8%
1920	23,101		8.9%
1930	22,642		−2.0%
1940	21,960		−3.0%
1950	15,135		−31.1%
1960	12,709		−16.0%
1970	11,855		−6.7%
1980	13,580		14.6%
1990	18,828		38.6%
2000	23,552		25.1%
2010	26,604		13.0%
2020	29,268		10.0%
2025 (est.)	34,252	▲	17.0%
U.S. Decennial Census; 1850–2010 2010 2020

=== Racial and ethnic composition ===
Grimes County, Texas – Racial and ethnic composition Note: the US Census treats Hispanic/Latino as an ethnic category. This table excludes Latinos from the racial categories and assigns them to a separate category. Hispanics/Latinos may be of any race.
Race / Ethnicity (NH = Non-Hispanic)	Pop 1980	Pop 1990	Pop 2000	Pop 2010	Pop 2020	% 1980	% 1990	% 2000	% 2010	% 2020
White alone (NH)	8,562	11,554	14,772	16,133	16,910	63.05%	61.37%	62.72%	60.64%	57.78%
Black or African American alone (NH)	3,743	4,552	4,667	4,348	3,824	27.56%	24.18%	19.82%	16.34%	13.07%
Native American or Alaska Native alone (NH)	4	40	50	82	85	0.03%	0.21%	0.21%	0.31%	0.29%
Asian alone (NH)	13	14	61	61	102	0.10%	0.07%	0.26%	0.23%	0.35%
Native Hawaiian or Pacific Islander alone (NH)	x	x	10	7	8	x	x	0.04%	0.03%	0.03%
Other race alone (NH)	26	11	8	16	84	0.19%	0.06%	0.03%	0.06%	0.29%
Multiracial (NH)	x	x	197	305	894	x	x	0.84%	1.15%	3.05%
Hispanic or Latino (any race)	1,232	2,657	3,787	5,652	7,361	9.07%	14.11%	16.08%	21.24%	25.15%
Total	13,580	18,828	23,552	26,604	29,268	100.00%	100.00%	100.00%	100.00%	100.00%

=== 2020 census ===
As of the 2020 census, the county had a population of 29,268. The median age was 42.9 years; 21.3% of the residents were under 18 and 19.6% were 65 or older. For every 100 females, there were 117.9 males, and for every 100 females 18 and over, there were 121.4 males 18 and over.

The racial makeup of the county was 63.5% White, 13.4% Black or African American, 0.8% American Indian and Alaska Native, 0.4% Asian, 0.1% Native Hawaiian and Pacific Islander, 11.0% from some other race, and 10.9% from two or more races. Hispanic or Latino residents of any race comprised 25.2% of the population.

About 25.5% of residents lived in urban areas, while 74.5% lived in rural areas.

Of the 10,133 households in the county, 31.6% had children under 18 living in them, 52.5% were married-couple households, 18.6% were households with a male householder and no spouse or partner present, and 23.8% were households with a female householder and no spouse or partner present. About 24.9% of all households were made up of individuals, and 12.2% had someone living alone who was 65 or older.

The county had 12,029 housing units, of which 15.8% were vacant. Among occupied housing units, 78.6% were owner-occupied and 21.4% were renter-occupied. The homeowner vacancy rate was 1.9% and the rental vacancy rate was 8.6%.

=== 2000 census ===
As of the 2000 census, 23,552 people, 7,753 households, and 5,628 families were residing in the county. The population density was 30 people per square mile (12 people/km^{2}). The 9,490 housing units had an average density of 12 units per square mile (4.6 units/km^{2}). The racial makeup of the county was 71.79% White, 19.96% African American, 0.32% Native American, 0.30% Asian, 5.98% from other races, and 1.65% from two or more races. About 16.08% of the population were Hispanics or Latinos of any race.

Of the 7,753 households, 34.6% had children under 18 living with them, 55.4% were married couples living together, 12.6% had a female householder with no husband present, and 27.4% were not families. About 23.8% of all households were made up of individuals, and 11.2% had someone living alone who was 65 or older. The average household size was 2.69, and the average family size was 3.18.

In the county, the age distribution was 24.8% under 18, 7.7% from 18 to 24, 29.8% from 25 to 44, 24.0% from 45 to 64, and 13.7% who were 65 or older. The median age was 38 years. For every 100 females, there were 117.50 males. For every 100 females 18 and over, there were 124.00 males.

The median income for a household in the county was $32,280, and for a family was $38,008. Males had a median income of $30,138 versus $21,747 for females. The per capita income for the county was $14,368. About 13.8% of families and 16.6% of the population were below the poverty line, including 20.4% of those under 18 and 18.1% of those 65 or over.

=== Religion ===
Christianity wass the primary religion in the county, and Hinduism was second.

== Government and infrastructure ==
=== County government ===
The Grimes County Commissioners Court is the primary decision-making body for the county government. The court is composed of the four county commissioners and is headed by the county judge, who oversees the day-to-day operation of the government. In addition to their policy-making duties, the four commissioners are responsible for road and bridge projects within their precincts. The current county judge, Joe Fauth III, entered office in 2017.

The Grimes County sheriff is the top law enforcement official in the county. The sheriff holds primary law enforcement responsibility over the county's unincorporated areas, and several cities covered under various interlocal agreements. The current sheriff, Donald G. Sowell, has held the office since 1998.

Other elected county officials include:

- The Grimes County district attorney is responsible for prosecuting criminal cases before the state district court.
- The Grimes county attorney represents the county in legal matters.
- The district clerk maintains district court records.
- The county clerk maintains the official county records.
- The county treasurer manages the county government's finances.
- The county tax assessor-collector assesses and collects county property taxes and local fees.
- The county court-at-law judge presides over the county's civil court.
- The justices of the peace preside over small-claims court matters in their precincts.
- The county constables fill process-serving and peace-officer roles in their precincts.

=== Texas Department of Criminal Justice facilities ===
The Texas Department of Criminal Justice operates the O.L. Luther Unit and the Wallace Pack Unit in an unincorporated area in Grimes County. In addition, the Pack Warehouse is located in an unincorporated area near the Pack Unit.

United States presidential election results for Grimes County, Texas
Year	Republican		Democratic		Third party(ies)	
Year	No.	%	No.	%	No.	%
1912	35	3.33%	941	89.45%	76	7.22%
1916	108	8.69%	1,108	89.14%	27	2.17%
1920	214	14.77%	1,027	70.88%	208	14.35%
1924	177	7.55%	2,136	91.09%	32	1.36%
1928	701	37.37%	1,175	62.63%	0	0.00%
1932	153	6.88%	2,065	92.89%	5	0.22%
1936	136	6.84%	1,851	93.06%	2	0.10%
1940	298	9.32%	2,899	90.62%	2	0.06%
1944	137	6.95%	1,559	79.14%	274	13.91%
1948	336	19.53%	901	52.38%	483	28.08%
1952	1,557	53.32%	1,362	46.64%	1	0.03%
1956	1,281	53.96%	1,079	45.45%	14	0.59%
1960	1,053	37.90%	1,713	61.66%	12	0.43%
1964	1,014	31.23%	2,229	68.65%	4	0.12%
1968	1,076	30.52%	1,473	41.79%	976	27.69%
1972	2,243	66.44%	1,116	33.06%	17	0.50%
1976	1,473	35.51%	2,656	64.03%	19	0.46%
1980	2,087	45.35%	2,440	53.02%	75	1.63%
1984	3,365	58.50%	2,370	41.20%	17	0.30%
1988	2,820	50.52%	2,735	49.00%	27	0.48%
1992	2,402	38.64%	2,594	41.72%	1,221	19.64%
1996	2,564	44.97%	2,584	45.33%	553	9.70%
2000	4,197	61.70%	2,450	36.02%	155	2.28%
2004	5,263	65.54%	2,713	33.79%	54	0.67%
2008	5,562	66.83%	2,704	32.49%	56	0.67%
2012	6,141	71.40%	2,339	27.19%	121	1.41%
2016	7,065	74.11%	2,194	23.01%	274	2.87%
2020	9,432	75.98%	2,833	22.82%	149	1.20%
2024	11,197	79.69%	2,734	19.46%	120	0.85%

United States Senate election results for Grimes County, Texas1
Year	Republican		Democratic		Third party(ies)	
Year	No.	%	No.	%	No.	%
2024	10,830	77.41%	2,900	20.73%	261	1.87%

United States Senate election results for Grimes County, Texas2
Year	Republican		Democratic		Third party(ies)	
Year	No.	%	No.	%	No.	%
2020	9,338	76.07%	2,678	21.82%	259	2.11%

Texas Gubernatorial election results for Grimes County
Year	Republican		Democratic		Third party(ies)	
Year	No.	%	No.	%	No.	%
2022	7,607	80.65%	1,732	18.36%	93	0.99%

== Communities ==
=== Cities ===
- Anderson (county seat)
- Bedias
- Iola
- Navasota
- Plantersville
- Todd Mission

=== Census-designated places ===
- Pinebrook
- Richards
- Shiro

=== Unincorporated communities ===
- Apolonia
- Roans Prairie
- Stoneham
- White Hall
- Singleton

== Education ==
School districts:

- Anderson-Shiro Consolidated Independent School District
- Iola Independent School District
- Madisonville Consolidated Independent School District
- Navasota Independent School District
- Richards Independent School District

Blinn College is the designated community college for all of the county.

== Notable residents ==
- Actor Chuck Norris lived near Navasota, the county's largest city, where he and his wife opened a bottled-water production facility. He starred in the television series Walker, Texas Ranger.

== See also ==
- National Register of Historic Places listings in Grimes County, Texas
- Recorded Texas Historic Landmarks in Grimes County
