= Navasota, Texas =

- City
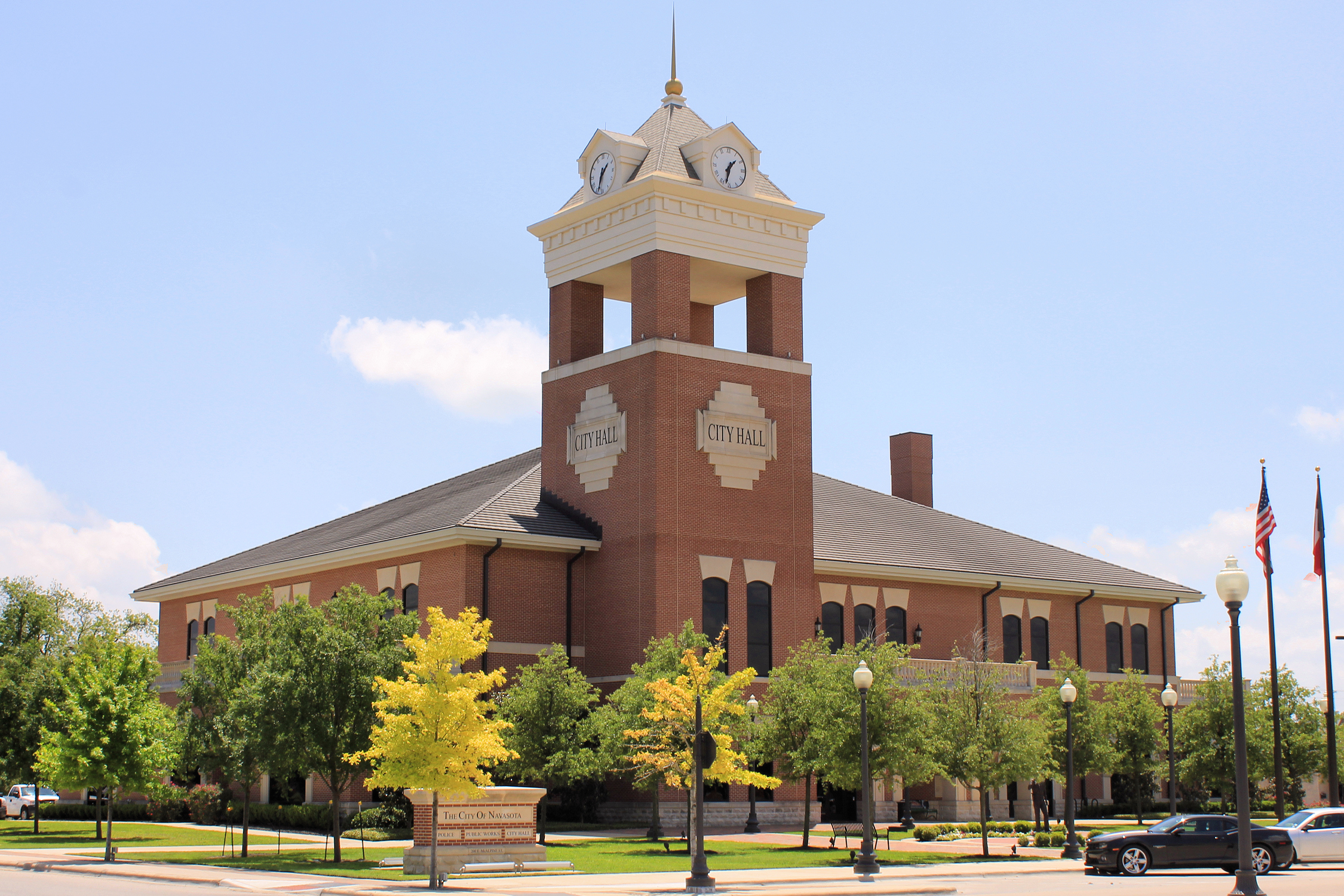
- Navasota City Hall
- Nickname: The Blues Capital of Texas
- Location of Navasota, Texas
- Coordinates: 30°23′N 96°5′W
- Country: United States
- State: Texas
- Counties: Brazos, Grimes

Government
  - Mayor: Bert Miller

Area
  - Total: 8.37 sq mi (21.67 km^{2})
  - Land: 8.33 sq mi (21.57 km^{2})
  - Water: 0.039 sq mi (0.10 km^{2})
- Elevation: 213 ft (65 m)

Population (2020)
  - Total: 7,643
  - Estimate (2025): 9,904
  - Density: 917.7/sq mi (354.3/km^{2})
- Time zone: UTC-6 (Central (CST))
  - Summer (DST): UTC-5 (CDT)
- ZIP Codes: 77868, 77869
- FIPS code: 48-50472
- GNIS feature ID: 2411217
- Website: www.navasotatx.gov

Navasota is a city primarily in Grimes County, Texas, United States. The population was 7,643 at the 2020 census. In 2005, the Texas Legislature designated Navasota as the "Blues Capital of Texas" in honor of the late Mance Lipscomb, a Navasota native and blues musician. A sliver of Navasota is in Brazos County, which is part of the Bryan–College Station metropolitan area. The city is home to Navasota Municipal Airport (60R), which handles small planes and jets with occasional helicopters.

== Geography ==
Navasota is located in southwestern Grimes County, east of the Navasota River (a tributary of the Brazos River). It is 71 miles (114 km) northwest of Houston. Texas State Highway 105 is the main east–west route that passes through the center of Navasota, leading southwest 25 miles (40 km) to Brenham and east 41 miles (66 km) to Conroe. Texas State Highway 6 passes north–south through the eastern side of the city as a four-lane bypass, leading northwest 22 miles (35 km) to College Station and south 21 miles (34 km) to Hempstead.

According to the United States Census Bureau, the city has a total area of 7.4 square miles (19.1 km^{2}), of which 0.04 square miles (0.1 km^{2}), or 0.47%, is water.

== History ==
The French explorer René-Robert Cavelier, Sieur de La Salle, who was misguided in his 1687 attempt to locate the Mississippi River and trying to find his way back to French-held lands near the Great Lakes, came through the area that would become Navasota, where he was murdered by one of his men. After numerous voyages, explorations of the Mississippi River valley, and trading ventures and several mutinies, La Salle's bones are believed to have found their resting place in the Navasota Valley.

Originally called Hollandale after Francis Holland who first settled the area in 1822, Navasota was situated within two Montgomery County land grants. Grimes County was created in 1846 but it would take the forward thinking of James Nolan and others like him before it would renamed Navasota in 1854. The origin of the name Navasota has been debated by many over the years. Some speculate it's a native American phrase meaning "prickly pear" while others lean toward "muddy waters," referring to the nearby Navasota and Brazos Rivers.

After September 1859, when the Houston and Texas Central Railway built rails through the town, Navasota became an important shipping and marketing center for the surrounding area. When the nearby historic town of Washington-on-the-Brazos resisted railways, it forfeited its geographic advantage and began to decline after many of its businesses and residents began to migrate to the new railhead 7 miles (11 km) to the northeast across the Brazos River at Navasota.

Slavery was integral to the local economy. A few wealthy planters depended on enslaved African Americans to provide labor for their large cotton plantations. The slaves were brought to the city and sold in the domestic slave trade. They worked primarily in the cotton fields, which were a major commodity crop in the area. Guns were made in nearby Anderson. Cotton, gunpowder, and shoes were made, processed, and stored in Anderson for the Confederacy during the American Civil War.

By 1865, the population of Navasota was about 2,700. Throughout the Civil War, all the marketable goods produced in the region were brought to Navasota, which at the time was the furthest inland railhead in Texas. Such goods were shipped south by rail to Galveston, where they could be transported by steamboat along the Texas coast and up the Mississippi River to the war effort or exported to Mexico or overseas to Europe.

== Disasters and decline ==
Navasota suffered a series of disasters in the mid-1860s that severely depleted its population. In 1865, a warehouse filled with cotton and gunpowder exploded after it was torched by returning Confederate soldiers. The blast killed a number of people and started a fire that destroyed much of the original downtown. Many buildings were damaged, including the post office. Not long afterward, the town was struck by a deadly cholera epidemic. That was followed in 1867 by an even more dangerous epidemic of yellow fever. Many Navasota citizens, including the mayor, fled to escape the disease, and the town's population dropped by about 50 percent.

In the late 1860s the KKK moved into Navasota, prompting a tense confrontation between federal soldiers and a crowd of local whites on one occasion.

Navasota was considered such a "wild and woolly" place that women and children were discouraged from going downtown even in broad daylight. The downtown buildings were overrun with lawless ruffians, gamblers, prostitutes, and drunks. Lawmen had to hide and watch, and often were afraid of the streets at night. There were many saloons and gaming halls to entertain the cowboys, railroad men, and others on the loose. Every Sunday morning the undertaker hitched up a buggy and went downtown to collect the bodies he expected to find after another wild Saturday night.

== Marshal Frank Hamer ==
In 1908, Navasota was still a Wild West boomtown: according to one source, "shootouts on the main street were so frequent that in two years at least a hundred men had died". Famed lawman Frank Hamer, then 24 years old, was hired from the Texas Rangers to become the City Marshal. Hamer moved in and imposed law and order, prosecuting Navasota criminals until the town became safe again. He served as marshal until 1911. Hamer became more widely known in 1934 as a leader of the posse that hunted down and fatally shot Bonnie and Clyde. In 2012, the City of Navasota commissioned local sculptor Russell Cushman to design and create a statue of Frank Hamer, which is now on display in front of the city hall building.

== Present ==
As of 2024, the population of the town was an estimated 9,471 people. The industrial sector of the community includes 23 companies with over 1,200 jobs. In 2009, Navasota was selected as a "Visionaries in Preservation" city by the Texas Historical Commission to protect the numerous historic structures in the city. A new municipal building was completed in 2011 and continued downtown improvements are under construction, with completion scheduled for 2023.

In 2012, Navasota Municipal Airport completed an expansion of its runway to 5,000 feet (1,500 m) long by 75 feet (23 m) wide and became able to accommodate jets on the runway.

In 2012, Navasota was named by the Union Pacific Railroad as "Train Town USA".

In August 2013, Navasota was named a Go Texan "Certified Retirement Community" by the Texas Department of Agriculture.

== Media ==
Navasota is served by the weekly Navasota Examiner newspaper, which has been reporting on Grimes County since 1894. The city is also home to the Willy 98.7 FM and 1550 AM radio stations, which are owned and managed by Bryan Broadcasting in Bryan, Texas. Willy 98.7 is a classic country station with local programming that includes the Navasota News and live broadcasts of Navasota Rattlers football games.

== Attractions ==
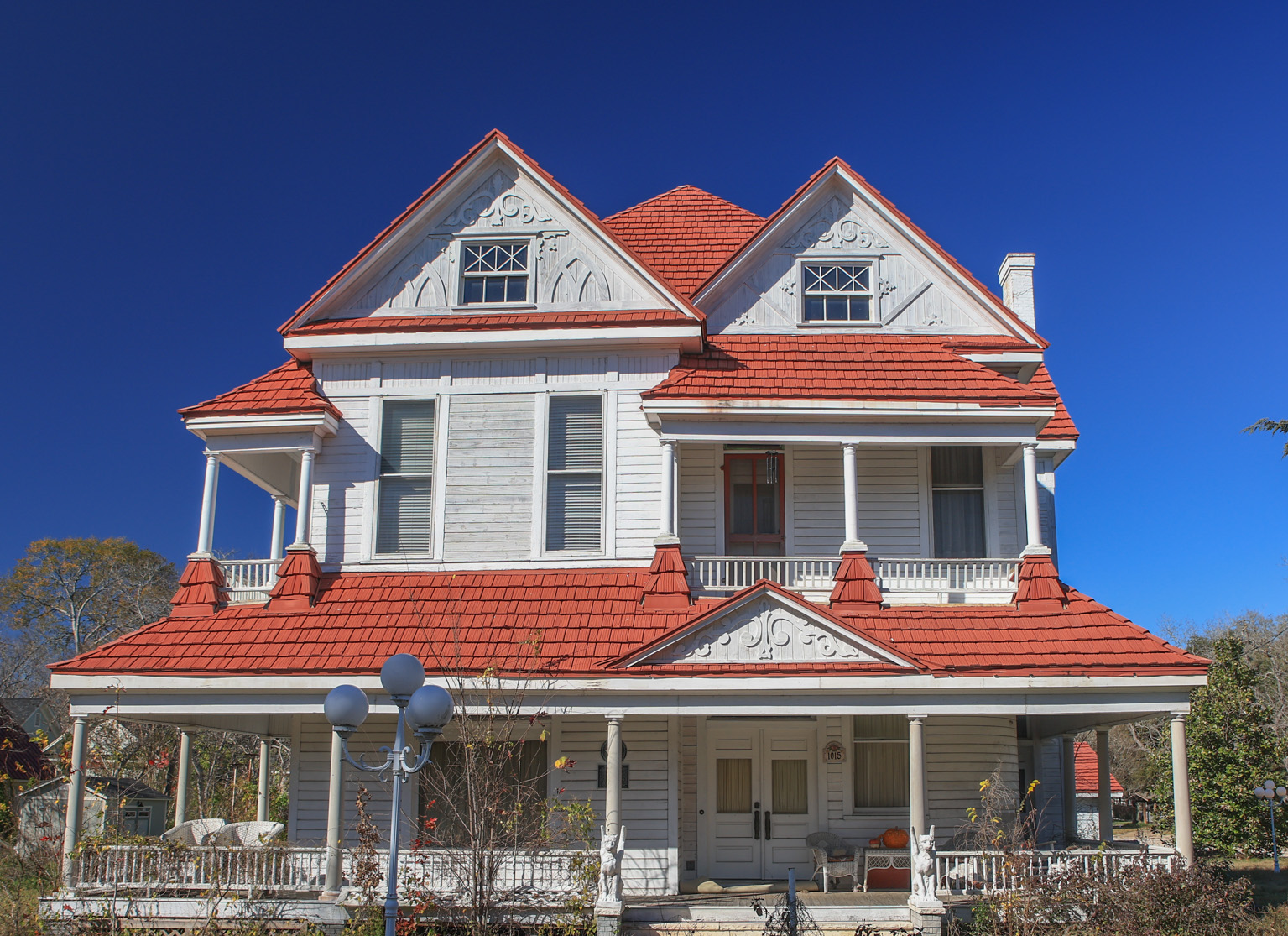
Foster House (built in 1900) in Navasota

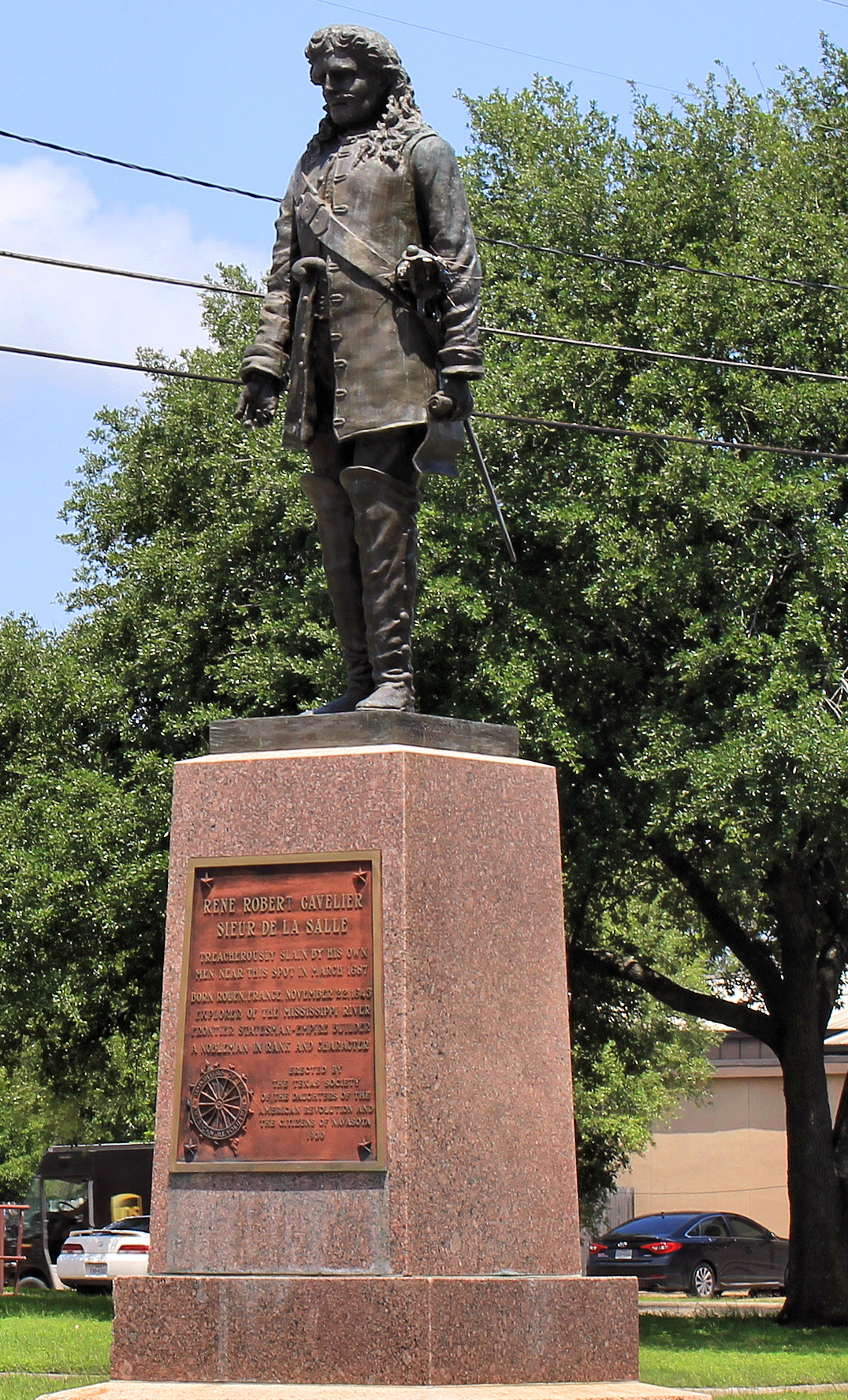
Statue of René-Robert Cavelier, Sieur de La Salle in Navasota

Navasota has many shops and artisans in its historic downtown district, including antique, gift, and boutique stores and art galleries housed in old classic stone and brick structures. Live plays are performed regularly at the Sunny Furman Theatre. The city also has golfing facilities and parks as well as wineries.

Navasota retains a number of historic Victorian homes on Washington Avenue, the main residential and commercial thoroughfare through town.

Another attraction is the historic Brule Field, a natural amphitheater built in the 1930s out of native stone. It served as the primary grid for the local high school football team, the Navasota Rattlers, until the new stadium was opened in 2007. Several native-stone churches also remain near downtown, with distinctive Victorian fronts.

The city is home to two statues of French explorer René-Robert Cavelier, Sieur de La Salle, including a bronze monument, dedicated in 1936 by the DAR, to celebrate the travels of the famous French explorer. The second is a stone bust that was previously in downtown, and was rededicated by the French consulate in May 2012 at nearby August Horst Park. The bust was donated to the city by the French government in 1978.

Navasota is home to Saint Francis Wolf Sanctuary, Texas's only licensed wolf sanctuary.

Each spring, Navasota is a popular destination for its bluebonnet fields, the state flower of Texas. A statue of Mance Lipscomb is now a part of Mance Lipscomb Park, near downtown. A statue of Frank Hamer stands in front of city hall, honoring the time he served as city marshal. Local artist and sculptor Russell Cushman designed and built the bronze statue. Other attractions include art galleries, the Horlock House Artists-in-Residence program and museum, live music venues, food truck parks and several murals that present great selfie locations for area visitors. Seasonal festivals attract crowds each year, with live music being a large part of the draw.

== Demographics ==
Historical population
| Census | Pop. | Note | %± |
|---|---|---|---|
| 1870 | 1,509 | | — |
| 1880 | 1,611 | | 6.8% |
| 1890 | 2,997 | | 86.0% |
| 1900 | 3,857 | | 28.7% |
| 1910 | 3,284 | | −14.9% |
| 1920 | 5,060 | | 54.1% |
| 1930 | 5,128 | | 1.3% |
| 1940 | 6,138 | | 19.7% |
| 1950 | 5,188 | | −15.5% |
| 1960 | 4,937 | | −4.8% |
| 1970 | 5,111 | | 3.5% |
| 1980 | 5,971 | | 16.8% |
| 1990 | 6,296 | | 5.4% |
| 2000 | 6,789 | | 7.8% |
| 2010 | 7,049 | | 3.8% |
| 2020 | 7,643 | | 8.4% |
U.S. Decennial Census; 1850–1900 1910; 1920 1930 1940; 1950 1960 1970; 1980 1990 2000; 2010

As of the 2020 census, there were 7,643 people in Navasota and the median age was 36.3 years; 26.2% of residents were under the age of 18 and 16.2% were 65 years of age or older. For every 100 females there were 93.1 males, and for every 100 females age 18 and over there were 90.3 males age 18 and over.

=== 2020 census ===
There were 2,779 households in Navasota, of which 37.9% had children under the age of 18 living with them. Of all households, 45.2% were married-couple households, 17.5% were households with a male householder and no spouse or partner present, and 31.2% were households with a female householder and no spouse or partner present. About 25.6% of all households were made up of individuals and 13.1% had someone living alone who was 65 years of age or older.

There were 3,112 housing units, of which 10.7% were vacant. The homeowner vacancy rate was 2.5% and the rental vacancy rate was 7.4%.

95.6% of residents lived in urban areas while 4.4% lived in rural areas.

Racial composition as of the 2020 census
| Race | Number | Percent |
|---|---|---|
| White | 3,038 | 39.7% |
| Black or African American | 2,061 | 27.0% |
| American Indian and Alaska Native | 72 | 0.9% |
| Asian | 26 | 0.3% |
| Native Hawaiian and Other Pacific Islander | 6 | 0.1% |
| Some other race | 1,235 | 16.2% |
| Two or more races | 1,205 | 15.8% |
| Hispanic or Latino (of any race) | 3,136 | 41.0% |

=== 2010 census ===
As of the 2010 census, 7,049 people, 2,206 households, and 1,726 families resided in the city. The population density was 1,109.7 inhabitants per square mile (428.5/km^{2}). The 2,805 housing units averaged 435.0 per square mile (167.9/km^{2}).

Of the 2,206 households, 37% had children under the age of 18 living with them, 43.5% were married couples living together, 20.8% had a female householder with no husband present, and 29% were not families. About 25.1% of all households were made up of individuals, and 10.4% had someone living alone who was 65 years of age or older. The average household size was 2.81 and the average family size was 3.39.

In the city, 30.7% of the population was under the age of 18, 10.6% were between 18 and 24, 26.7% were between 25 and 44, 18.0% were between 45 and 64, and 12.6% were 65 years of age or older. The median age was 32.9 years. For every 100 females, there were 86.5 males. For every 100 females age 18 and over, there were 81.0 males.

The median income for a household in the city was $38,000, and for a family was $31,875. Males had a median income of $28,585 versus $21,731 for females. The per capita income for the city was $14,564. About 23.8% of families and 23.7% of the population were below the poverty line, including 34.7% of those under age 18 and 24.0% of those age 65 or over.

== Government and infrastructure ==
The United States Postal Service operates the Navasota Post Office.

The Texas Department of Criminal Justice (TDCJ) operates the O.L. Luther Unit and the Wallace Pack Unit in an unincorporated area in Grimes County near Navasota. In addition, the Pack Warehouse is located in an unincorporated area near the Pack Unit.

== Education ==
The Navasota Independent School District includes five traditional campuses and one academic alternative school campus. All campuses received a Met Standard rating from the Texas Education Agency. Navasota High School earned a distinction in ELA/Reading and exceeded state targets in Student Progress, Student Achievement, Closing Performance Gaps, and Post-Secondary Readiness. Navasota Junior High exceeded state targets in Student Progress and Post-Secondary Readiness. John C. Webb Elementary exceeded state targets in Student Progress and Post-Secondary Readiness. Brule Elementary exceeded state targets in Student Progress, Closing Performance Gaps, and Post-Secondary Readiness. High Point Elementary earned distinctions in ELA/Reading, Mathematics, Top 25 Percent Closing Gaps, Top 25 Percent Student Progress, and Post-Secondary Readiness. High Point Elementary exceeded state targets in Student Progress, Student Achievement, Closing Performance Gaps, and Post-Secondary Readiness.

NISD offers instructional support for learners through a variety of programs such as Advanced Academics/GT, Dual Credit College Classes, Dyslexic Services, English as a Second Language Support, Program 504 Support, Special Services for needs such as speech, learning disabilities, and other health impairments, Pre-Kindergarten Classes, Tiered Supports through RtI, and an Academic Alternative School.

The average student to teacher ratio is 14:1.

School organizations and athletics available to students include Business Professionals of America, FFA, Student Council, National Honor Society, Theatre, Choir, Kickstart, Band, Bass Fishing, FCA, Skills USA, Library Club, Boyz II Men, Princess Code, UIL Academics, One Act Play, HOSA-Future Health Science Professionals, Spanish Club, Family, Career and Community Leaders of America, Football, Volleyball, Cross Country, Drill Team, Cheer, Basketball, Golf, Tennis, Baseball, Softball, Powerlifting, Soccer, and Track.

In 1990, the boys basketball team won the 3A state championship with a 35–0 record after beating Gainesville and Lamesa at the state tournament played at the University of Texas' Frank Erwin Center.

The Navasota Rattlers were 3A Div. II State Football Champions in 2012 and 4A Div. I State Football Champions in 2014.

== Notable people ==
- Alvin Ailey, dancer and choreographer
- Kathleen Blackshear, artist
- Rosa Meador Goodrich Boido, physician, suffragist
- Clay Condrey, Major League baseball pitcher
- Virgil "Ned" Garvin, Major League baseball pitcher
- Frank Hamer, Navasota city marshal and Texas Ranger
- Gennie James, former child actress
- Christine M. Jones, a former Maryland legislator
- René-Robert Cavelier, Sieur de La Salle, French explorer who was killed near present-day Navasota in 1687
- Milt Larkin, musician
- Mance Lipscomb, blues singer
- R. Bowen Loftin, a Texas A&M University president who was a graduate of Navasota High School
- Chuck Norris, martial artist
- Robert Reed, Brady Bunch dad
- Christopher B. "Stubb" Stubblefield, restaurateur
- Joe Tex, soul musician
- Hazel Hainsworth Young, educator and centenarian

== See also ==
- USS Navasota, named after the Navasota River

== Photo gallery ==
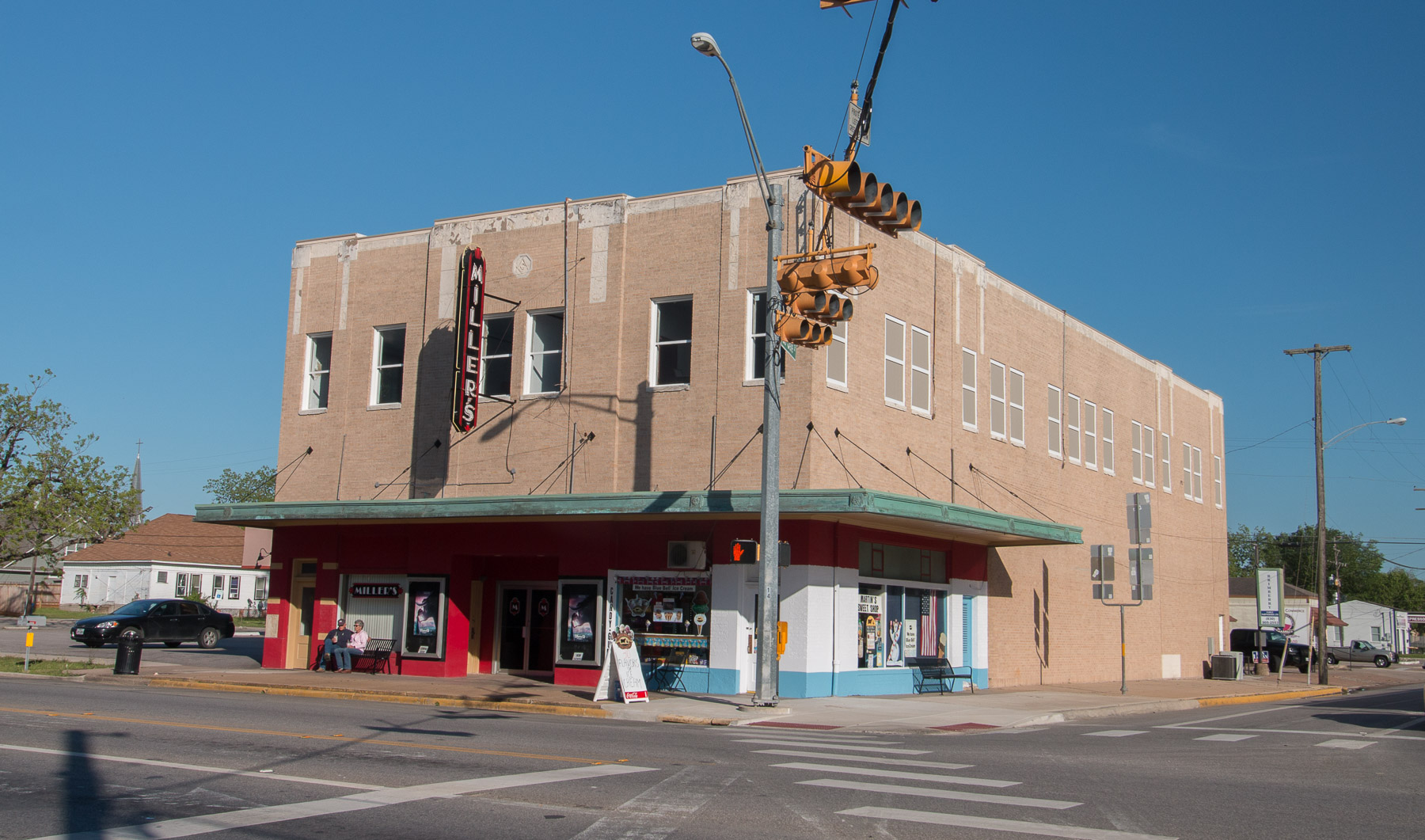
Miller's

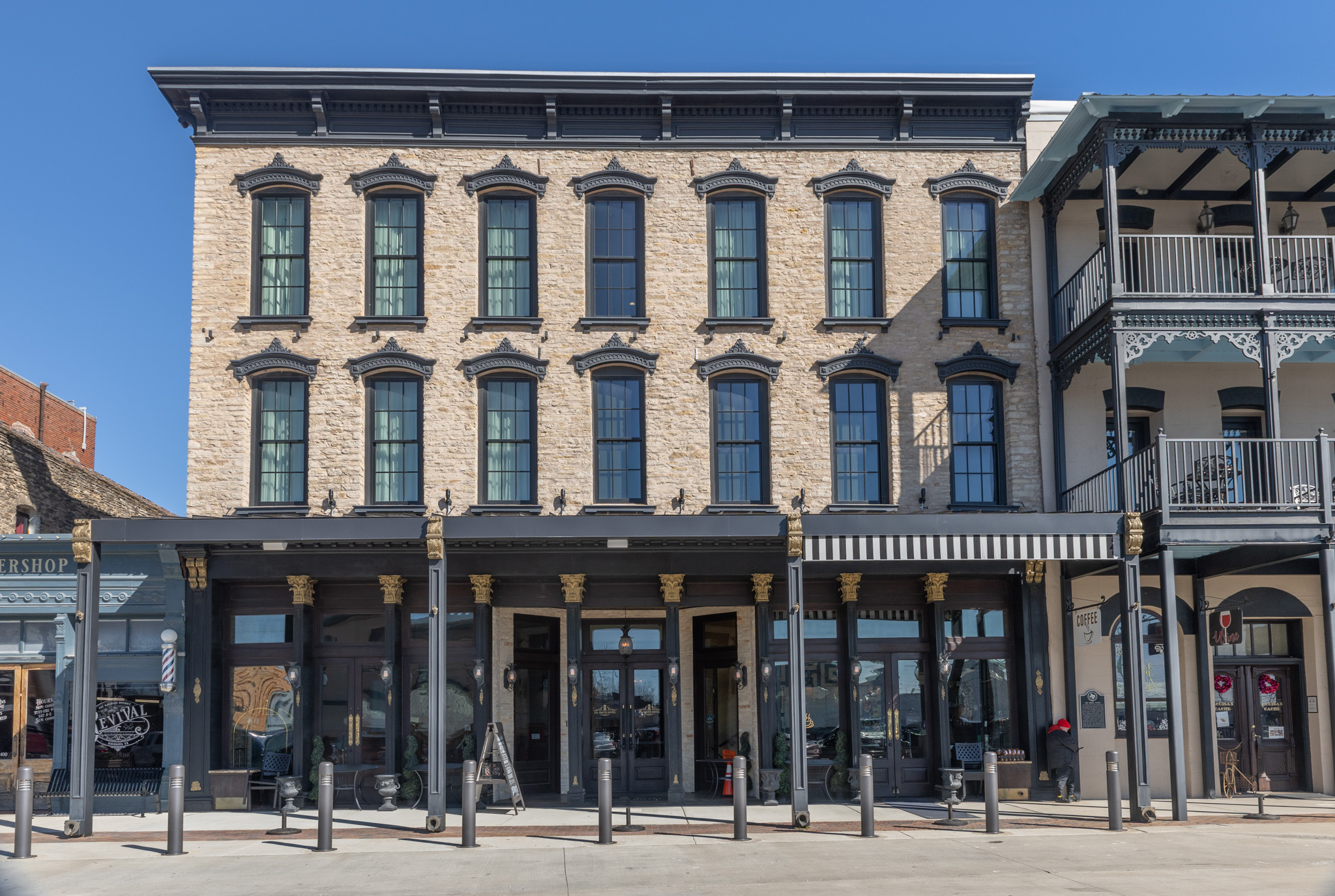
P.A. Smith Hotel

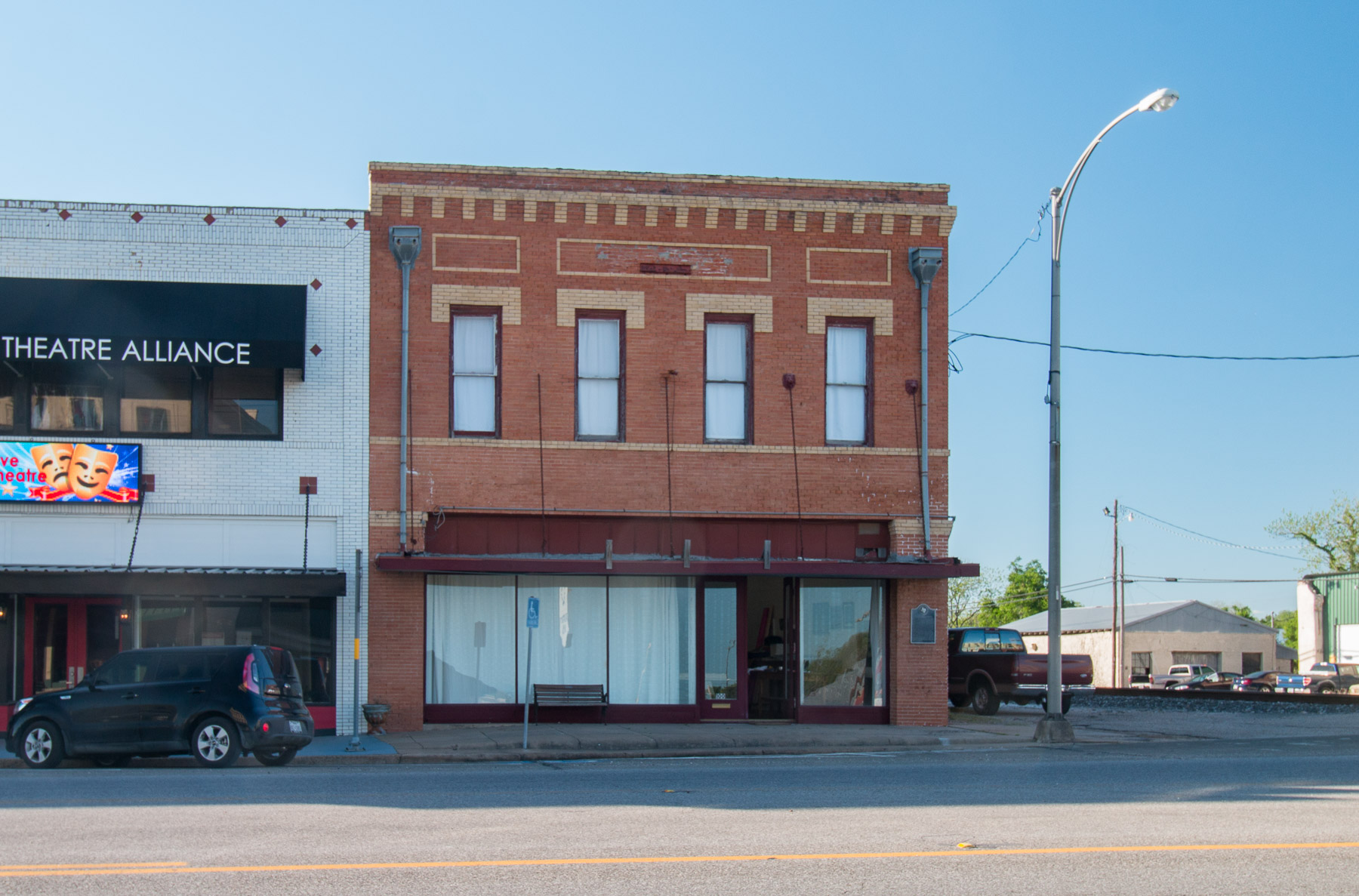
Lewis Wilson Building

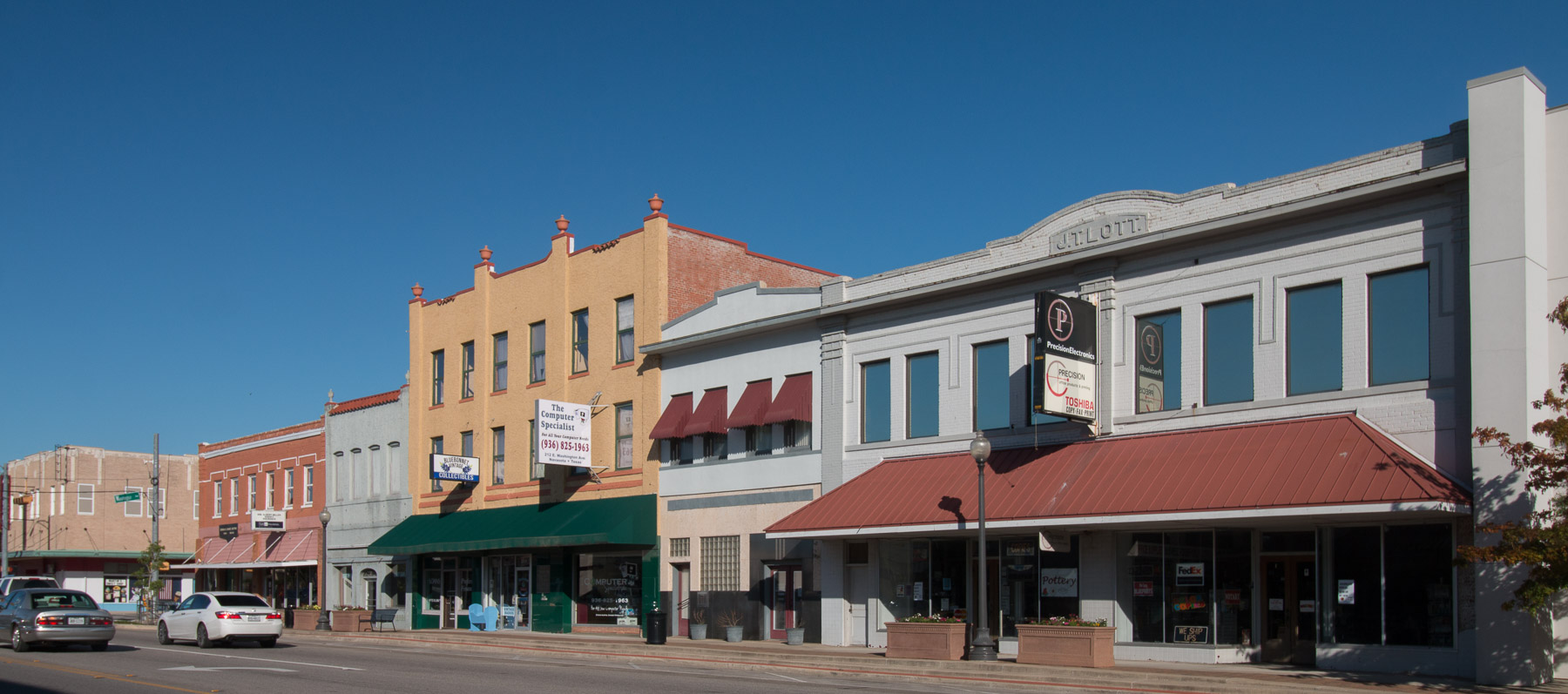
Downtown Navasota

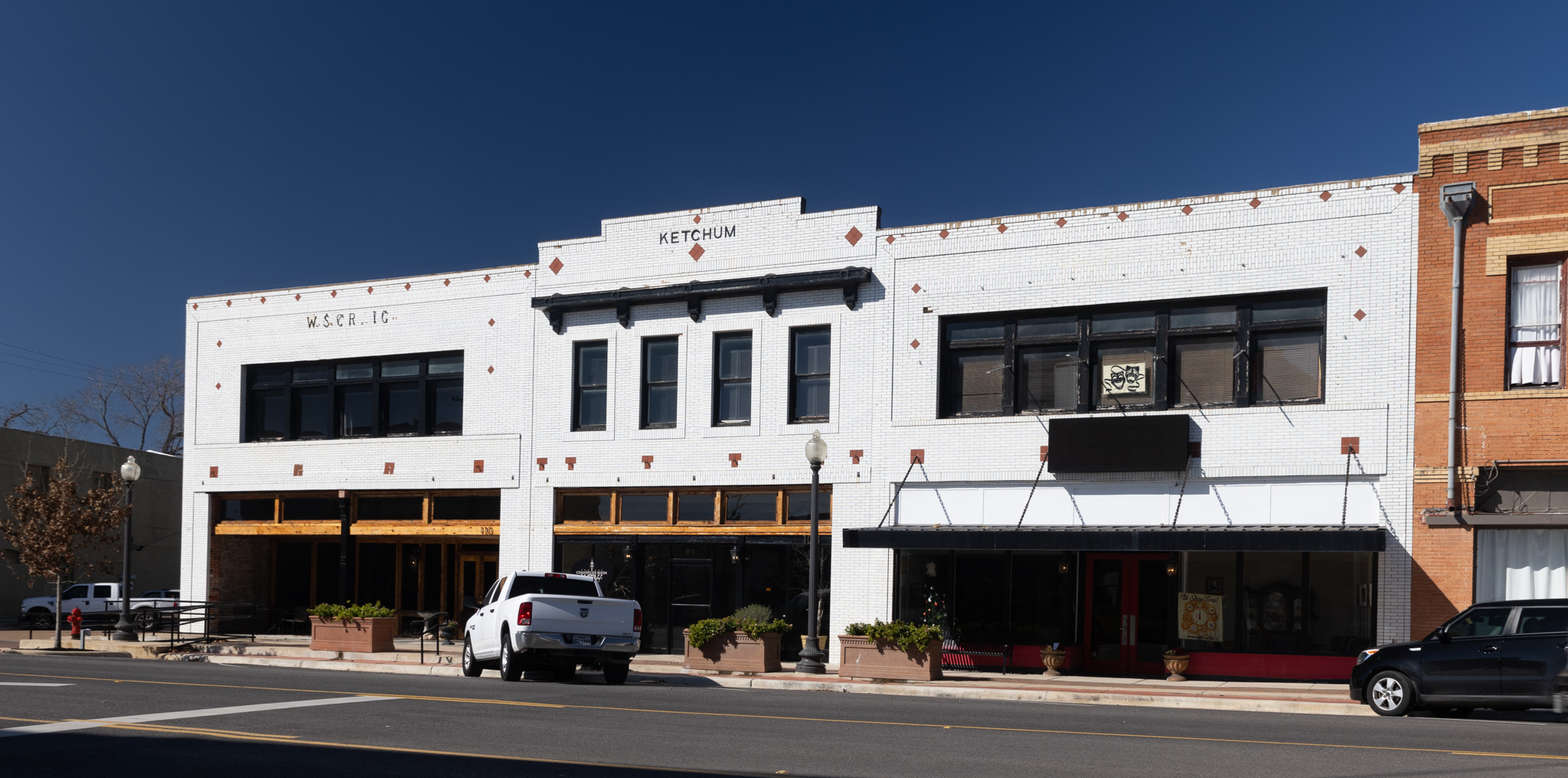
Ketchum Building

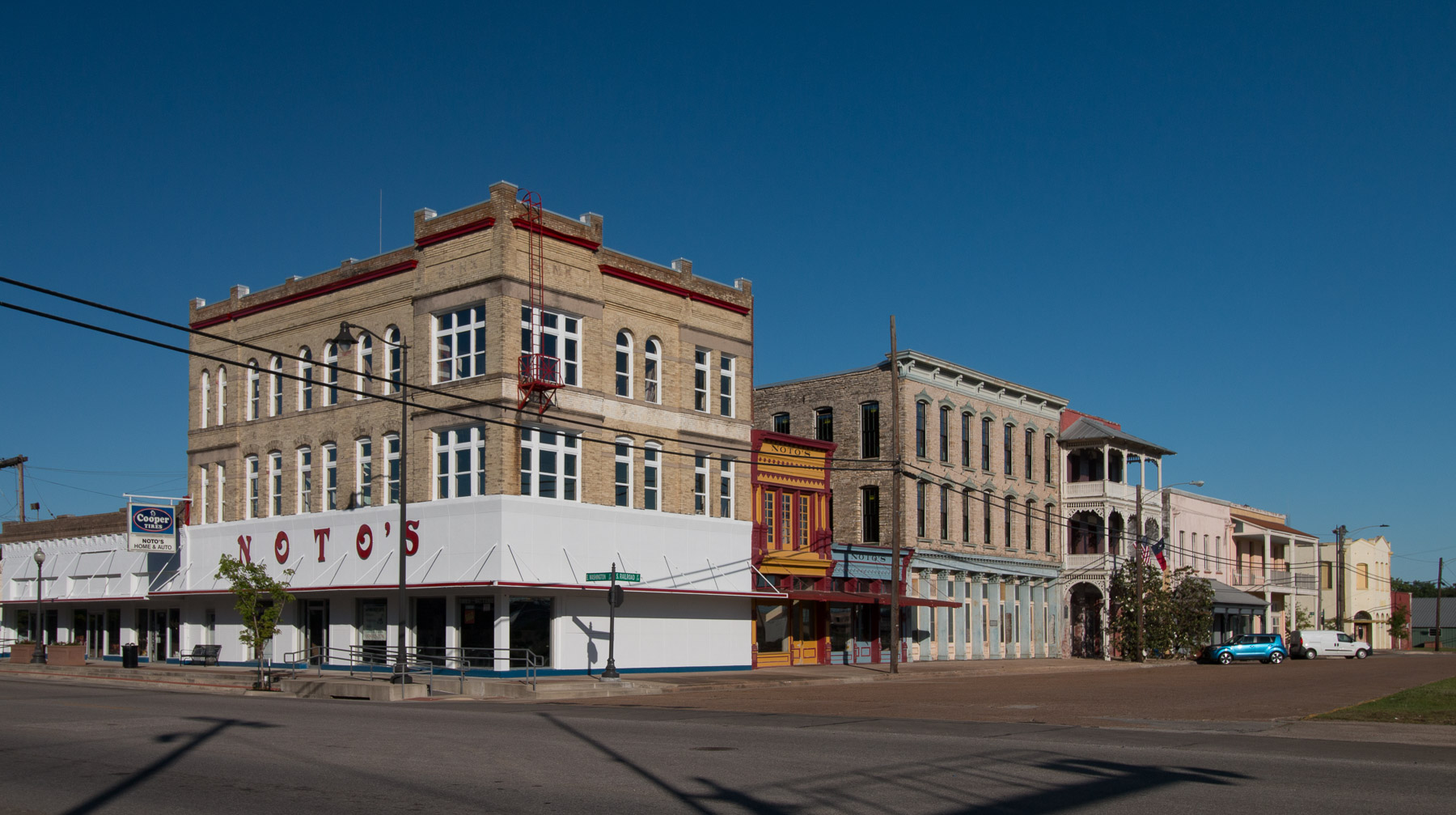
Downtown Navasota

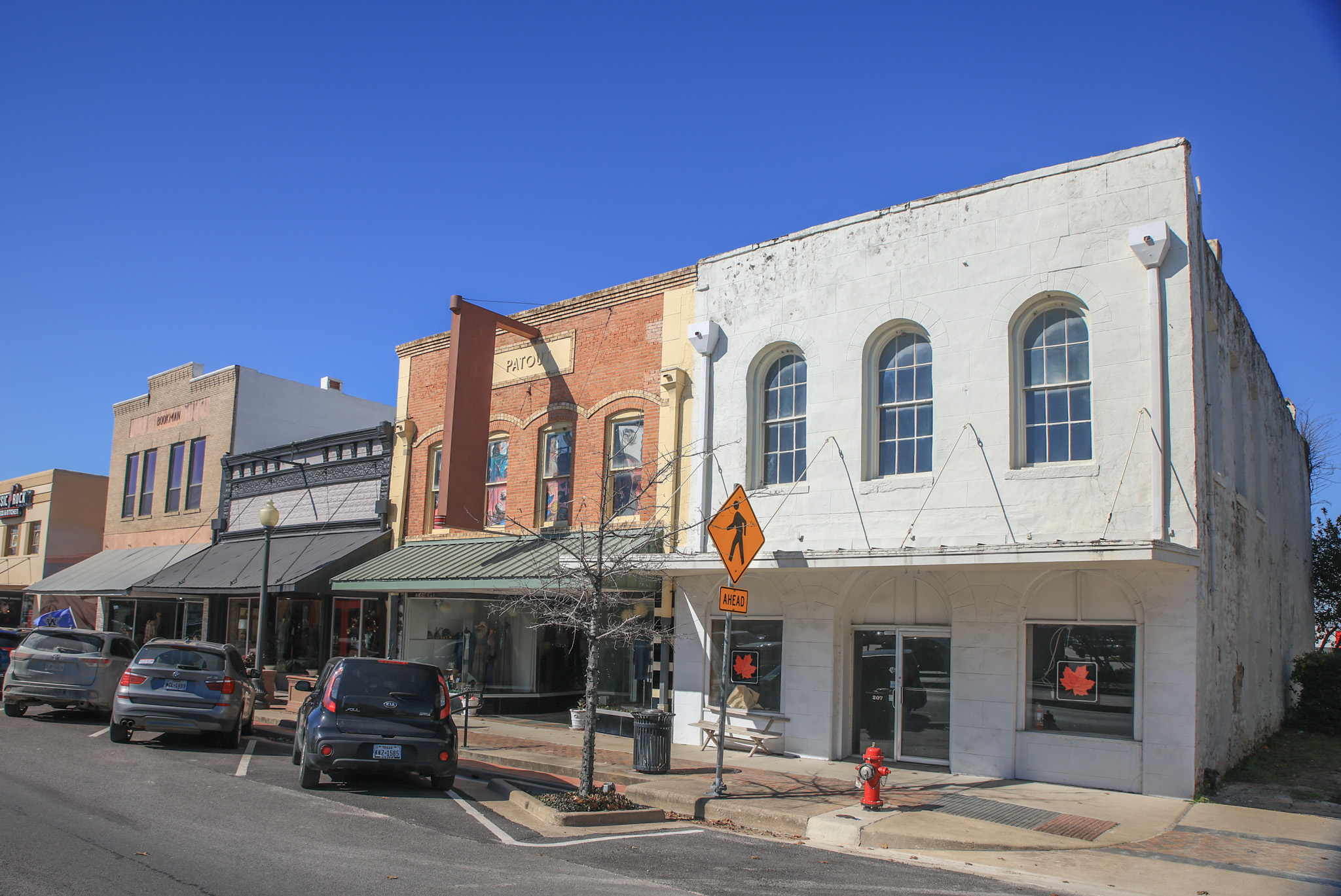
Downtown Navasota

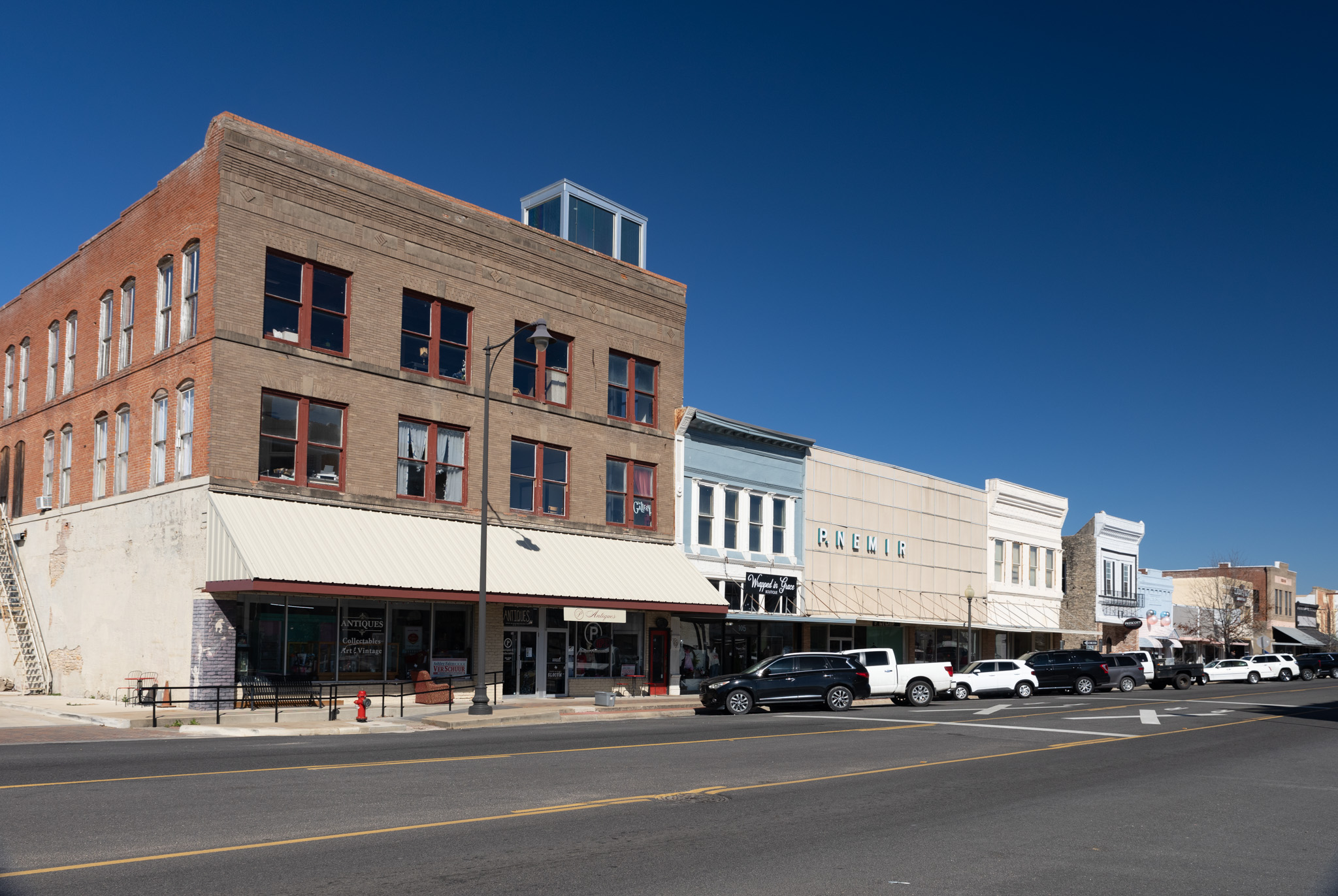
Downtown Navasota

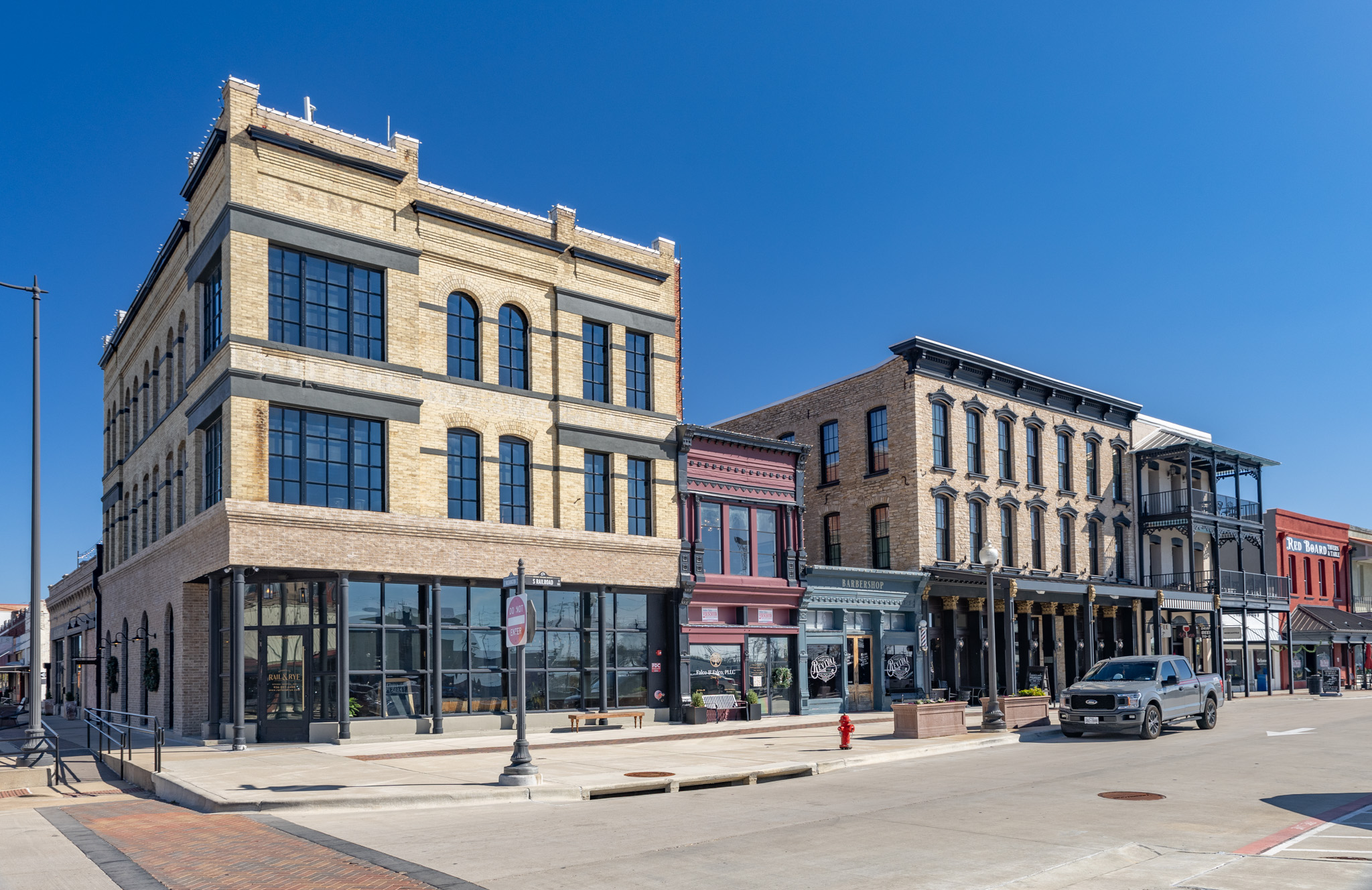
Downtown Navasota

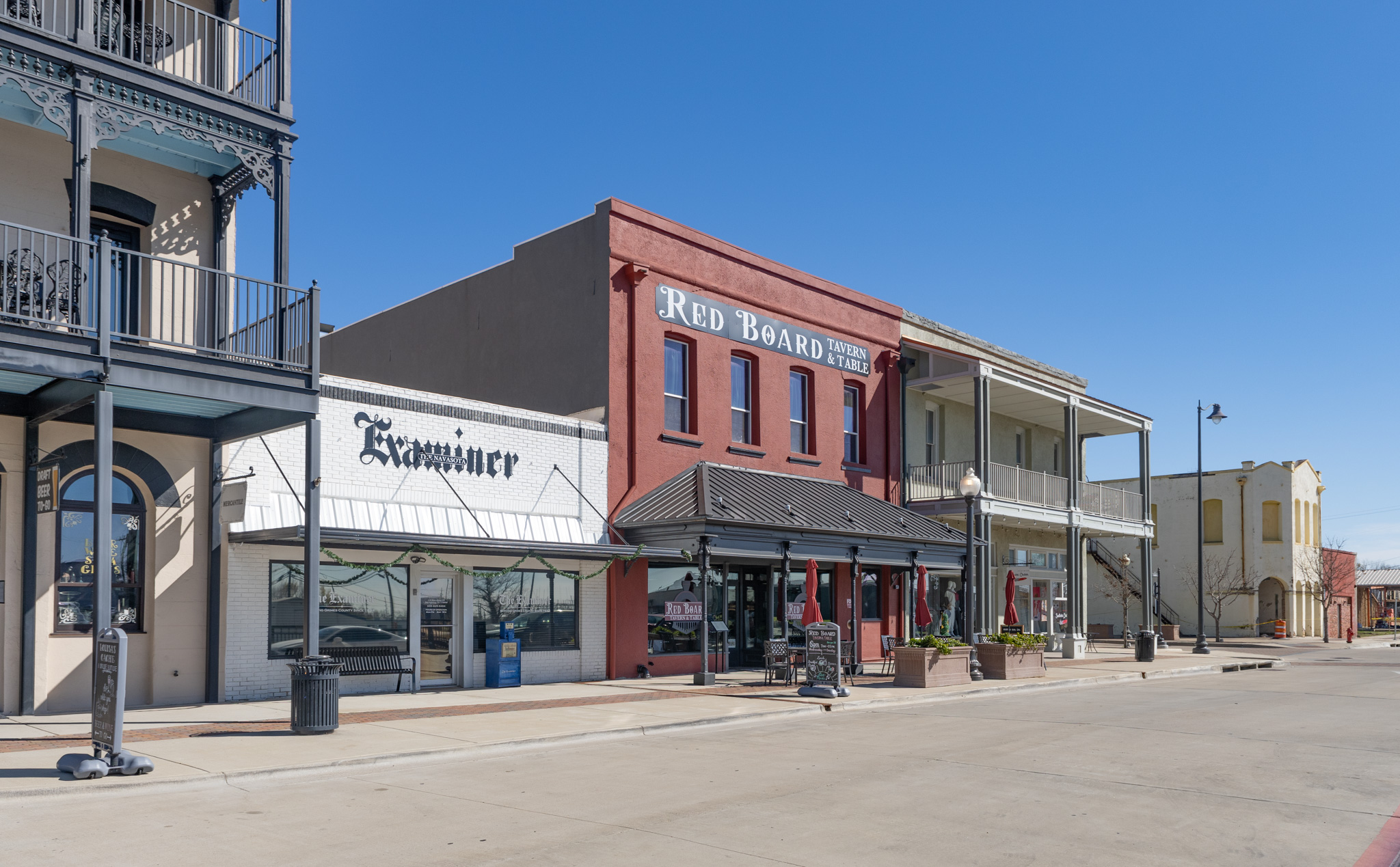
Downtown Navasota

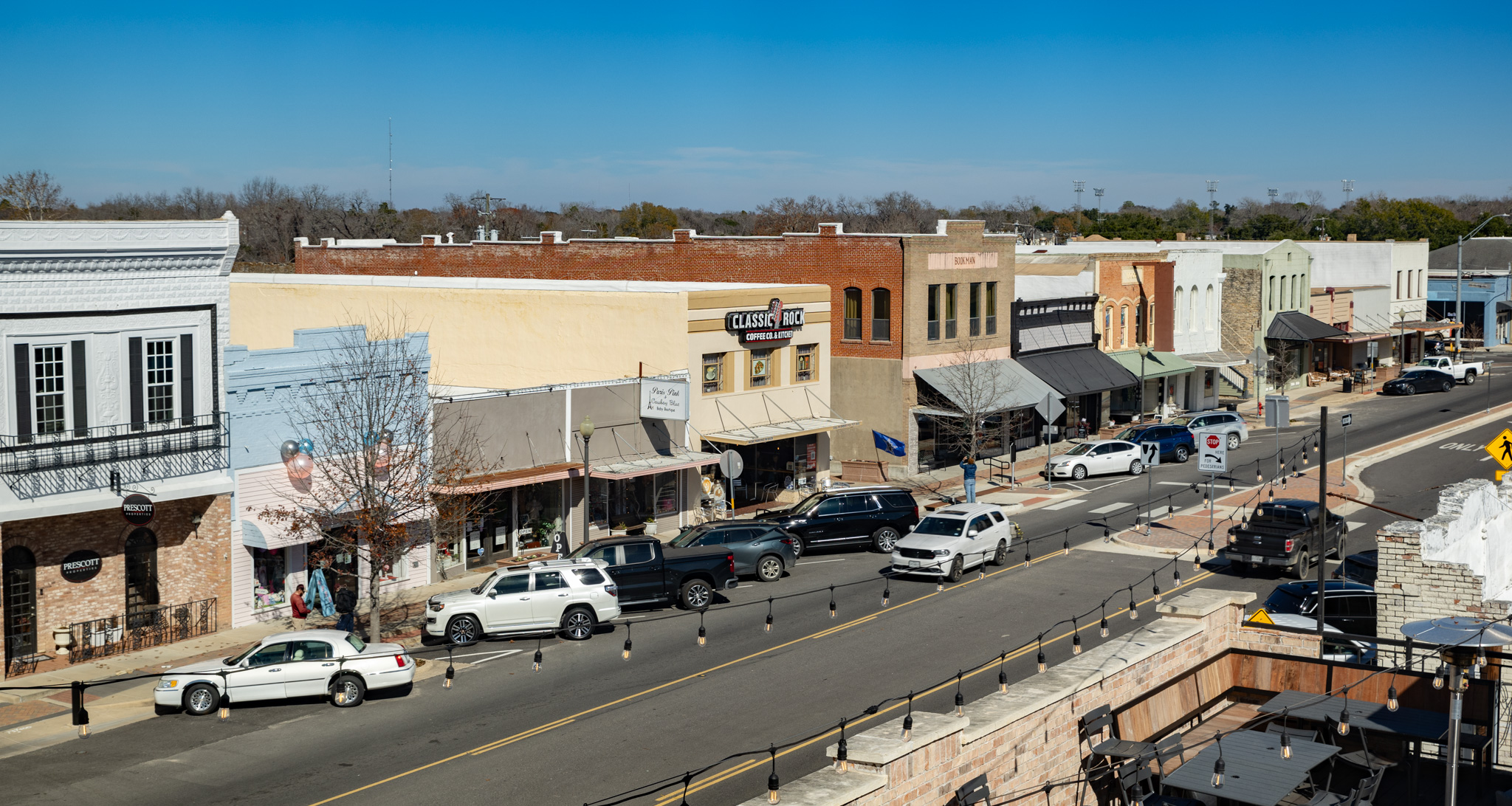
Downtown Navasota

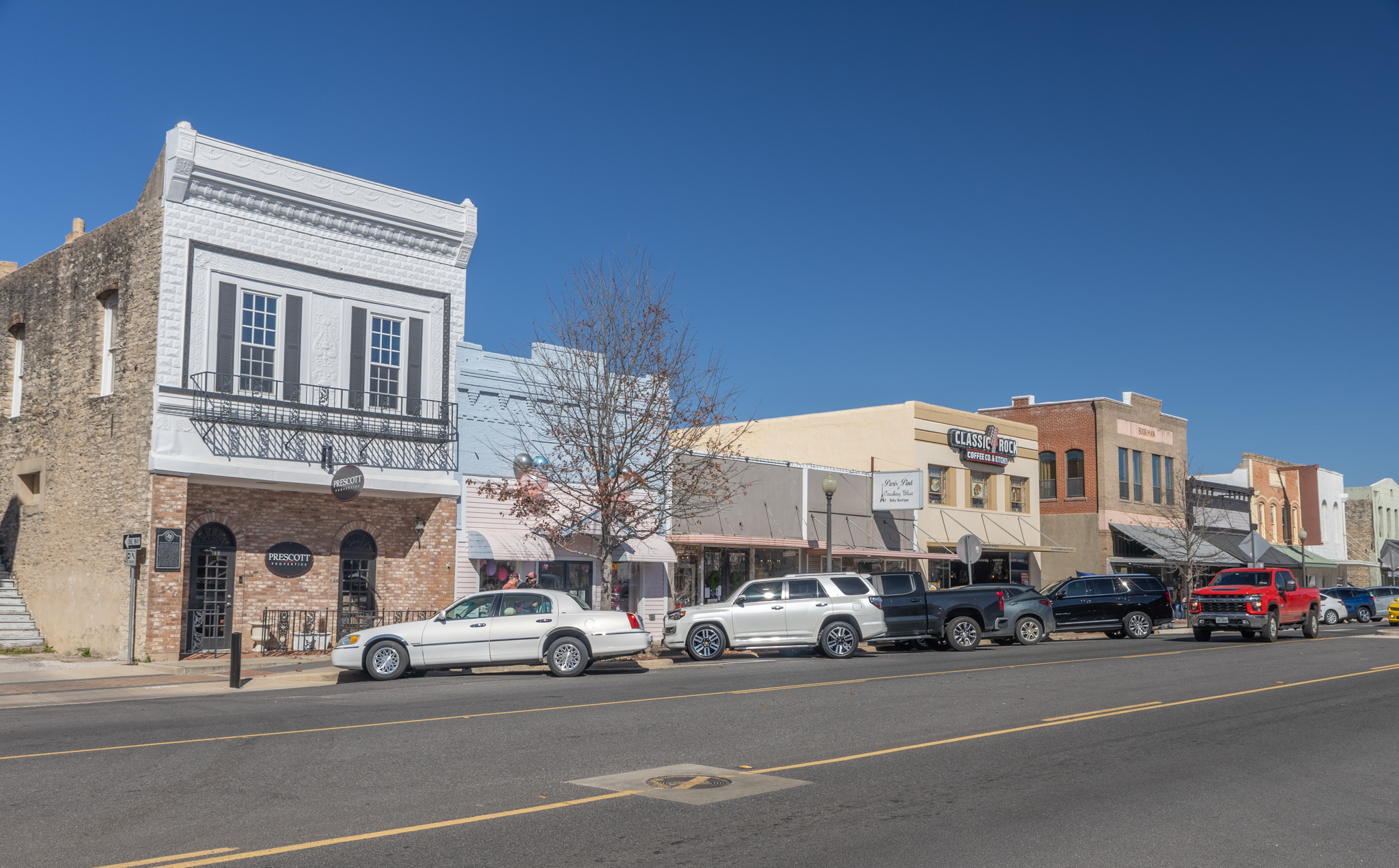
Downtown Navasota
