= Richards High School (Richards, Texas) =

Location
- 9477 Panther Drive; Richards, Texas 77873; United States; 30.538937°N 95.842686°W

Information
- School type: Public high school
- School district: Richards Independent School District
- Principal: Bill Boyce
- Teaching staff: 20.81 (FTE)
- Grades: 7-12
- Enrollment: 235 (2023-2024)
- Student to teacher ratio: 11.29
- Colors: Red & Black
- Athletics conference: UIL Class 1A
- Mascot: Panther
- Website: Richards High School

Richards High School is a public high school located in Richards, Texas (USA) and classified as a 1A school by the UIL. It is a part of the Richards Independent School District located in south central Grimes County. In 2015, the school was rated "Met Standard" by the Texas Education Agency.

== Athletics ==
The Richards Panthers compete in these sports -

- Basketball
- Cross Country
- Golf
- Track and Field
- Volleyball

=== State Titles ===
- Boys Basketball
  - 1976(B)
