= Bath, Texas =

Ghost town in Texas, US

- Ghost town
- Location in Texas
- Coordinates: 30.5946426°N 95.6238341°W
- Country: United States
- State: Texas
- County: Walker
- Elevation: 256 ft (78 m)
- USGS Feature ID: 1381362

Bath, formerly Possum Walk, is a ghost town in Walker County, Texas, United States.

== History ==
Bath is situated on Farm to Market Road 1374, which connects to U.S. Route 45. In 1872, the Union Hill Baptist Church was founded. The name was changed to Bath after the post office was established in 1887. The post office closed in 1905. The community was abandoned by the early 1990s.
