= Old Carolina, Texas =

Ghost town in Texas, US

Old Carolina, formerly Bath, is a ghost town in Walker County, Texas, United States.

== History ==
Old Carolina is situated on the west bank of the Trinity River, and was founded on land granted by John H. Cummings, nearby the Missouri Pacific Railroad. The town was founded in the 1830s, and was originally called Bath, and was renamed to Old Carolina c. 1838, honor of a settler named Carolina Shores. Old Carolina was used by steamboats on the Trinity River as a refuel station. By 1990, it was absorbed by Waterwood, Texas.
