= GCTC =

GCTC may refer to:

- Gagarin Cosmonaut Training Center, a space travel facility in Russia
- Great Canadian Theatre Company, a dramatic theatre company in Ottawa, Ontario, Canada
- Global City Teams Challenge, a collaborative platform for the development of smart cities and communities, led by National Institute of Standards and Technology, a bureau of United States Department of Commerce, in partnership with other U.S. federal agencies including National Science Foundation, International Trade Administration, and the National Telecommunications and Information Administration.
- Gulf Coast Trades Center in Walker County, Texas
