= Dodge, Texas =

Dodge
- Unincorporated community
- Location within the state of Texas Dodge (the United States)
- Coordinates: 30°44′44″N 95°23′53″W
- Country: United States
- State: Texas
- County: Walker
- Elevation: 400 ft (120 m)

Population (2000)
  - Total: 184
- Time zone: UTC-6 (Central (CST))
  - Summer (DST): UTC-5 (CDT)
- ZIP codes: 77334
- GNIS feature ID: 1381774

Dodge is an unincorporated community in eastern Walker County, Texas, United States, on the northern edge of the Sam Houston National Forest. It lies along FM 405 east of the city of Huntsville, the county seat of Walker County. Its elevation is 400 feet (122 m). Although Dodge is unincorporated, it has a post office, with the ZIP code of 77334; the ZCTA for ZIP Code 77334 had a population of 184 at the 2000 census.

Although settlers first arrived in the Dodge area in the 1820s, the community was founded in 1872 by William H. Parmer, the son of Martin Parmer. Dodge grew up around the Dodge Station of the Houston and Great Northern Railroad; it was named for Phelps Dodge, the company that constructed the community. Dodge's post office was established in 1881. Although the community flourished for several decades, it declined with the coming of the Great Depression.

== Climate ==
The climate in this area is characterized by hot, humid summers and generally mild to cool winters. According to the Köppen Climate Classification system, Dodge has a humid subtropical climate, abbreviated "Cfa" on climate maps.
