= Lone Star Hiking Trail =

Trail in Texas

Lone Star Trail
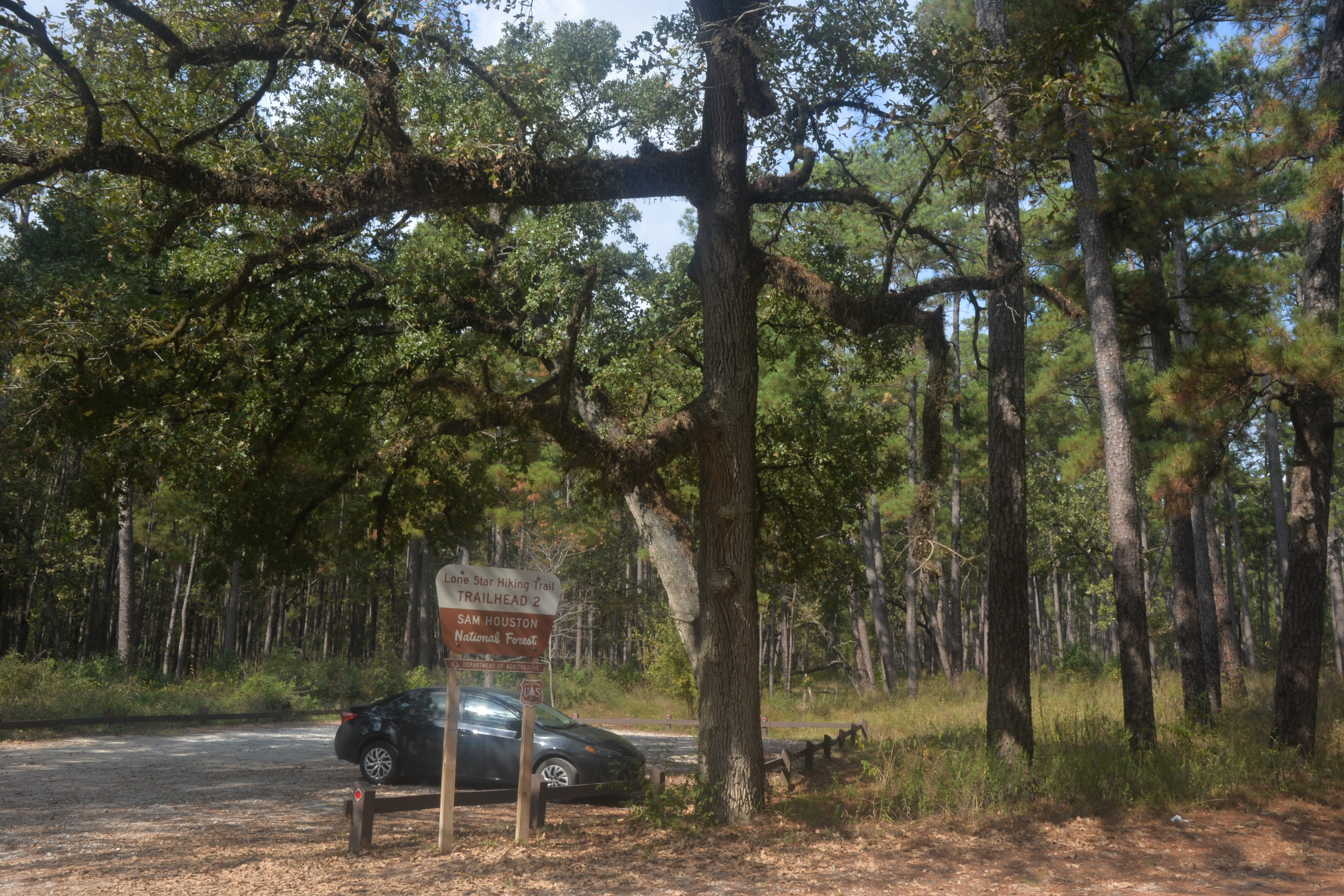
- Trail Head #2, Little Lake Creek Wilderness
- Length: 152 kilometres (94 miles)
- Location: Texas
- Use: Hiking
- Elevation gain/loss: 1,381 m (4,531 ft)
- Difficulty: Easy

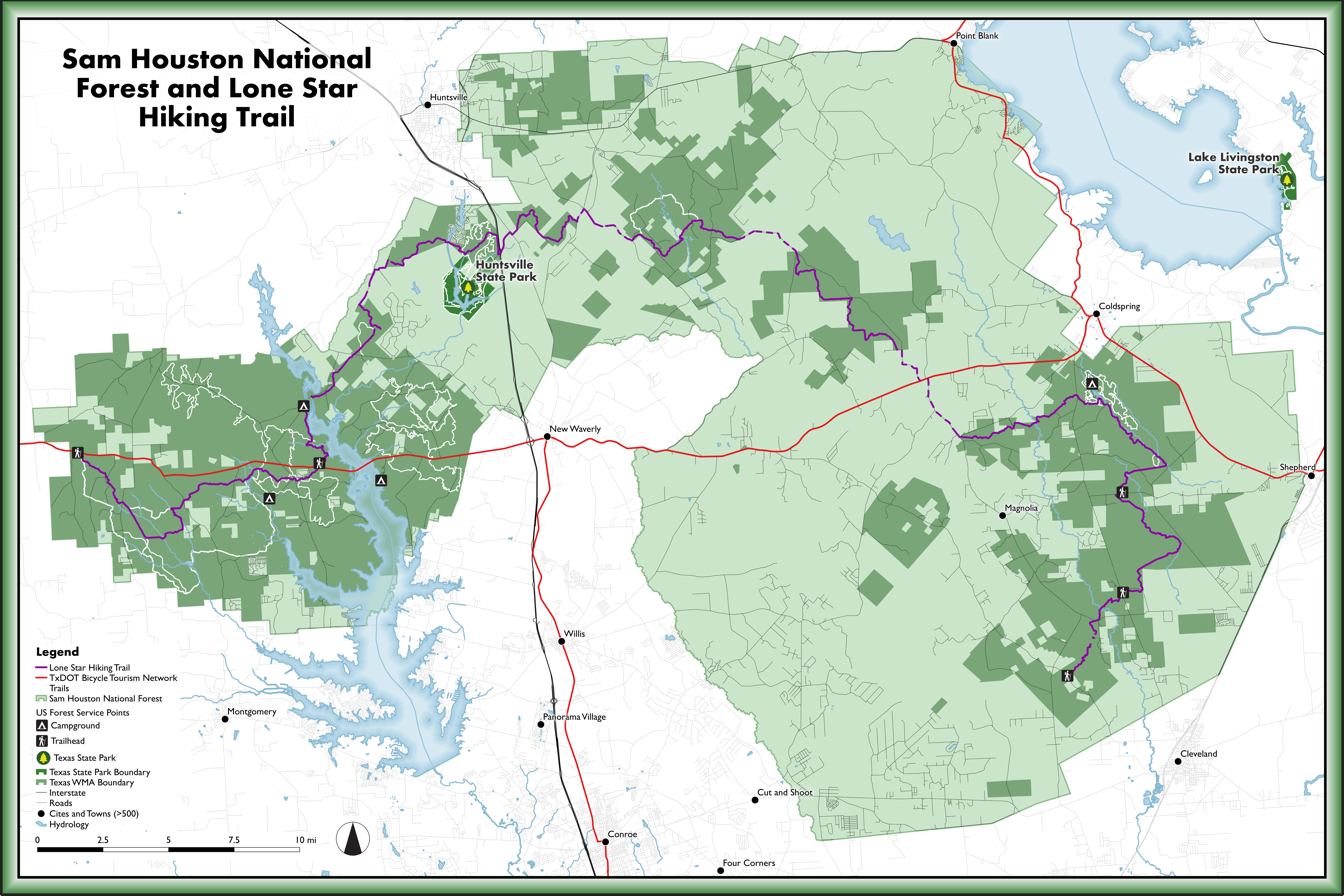
Map of the Lone Star Hiking Trail

The Lone Star Hiking Trail (LSHT) is a 96 mile long hiking trail with an additional 32 miles of loop and crossover trails of footpath-only trails. Connecting public lands of the Sam Houston National Forest and private lands it is the longest continuous hiking trail in the State of Texas. The trail starts just South of Richards, Texas and ends North-West of Cleveland, Texas.

The LSHT was conceived by the Lone Star Chapter of the Sierra Club in 1966. The U.S. Forest Service (USFS) approved construction of the trail and flagging began in 1967, with the first 30 miles constructed in 1968. The Sierra Club, Boy Scouts of America, and many others were responsible for flagging and construction of the LSHT. The entire LSHT was completed and turned over to the USFS in 1972. An extension to the LSHT was approved later and completed in 1978.

The trail is marked with two-inch by four-inch aluminum markers to guide hikers. The Lone Star Hiking Trail may be hiked year round, but winter and spring are the most popular seasons due to the mild southeast Texas climate. During deer hunting season in November and December, hikers should wear highly visible clothing. Primitive camping is allowed off the trail except during deer hunting season when camping is restricted to designated camps. Usually the trail is not crowded, and hikers may observe a multiple-use managed forest with many ages and kinds of trees, plants and wildlife. Trail visitors may also view rivers, creeks, lakes and streams that meander through and around the Sam Houston National Forest. Off-road vehicles are prohibited. Potable water is available at Double Lake and Stubblefield recreation areas.

Lone Star Hiking Trail consists of three major sections (listed from west to east):

- The 40-mile (64 km) Lake Conroe section begins near the intersection of FS 219 and FM 149 east of Richards, TX to the Stubblefield Recreation area at the north end of Lake Conroe. Four connecting loops in this area are all designated as part of the trail. This part of trail passes through the Little Lake Creek Wilderness.
- The 60-mile (97 km) Central Area of the trail runs northeast from the Stubblefield Recreation Area, to just north of Huntsville State Park. It runs east through the Four Notch area and then turns south east to the town of Evergreen, TX. An on-road section follows FM 945 south to a trailhead parking lot at S Butch Arthur Road. The Four Notch Loop, a 9.2-mile (14.8 km) section, is in the middle of this 60-mile (97 km) area of trail.
- The Winters Bayou/Tarkington Creek Area of the trail runs from FM 945/S Butch Arthur Road trailhead east to Double Lake Recreation Area, then south through Big Creek Scenic Area and then southwest through the Winters Bayou Scenic area northwest of Cleveland, TX. This 27-mile (43 km) section of the trail has National Recreation Trail status.

== Gallery ==
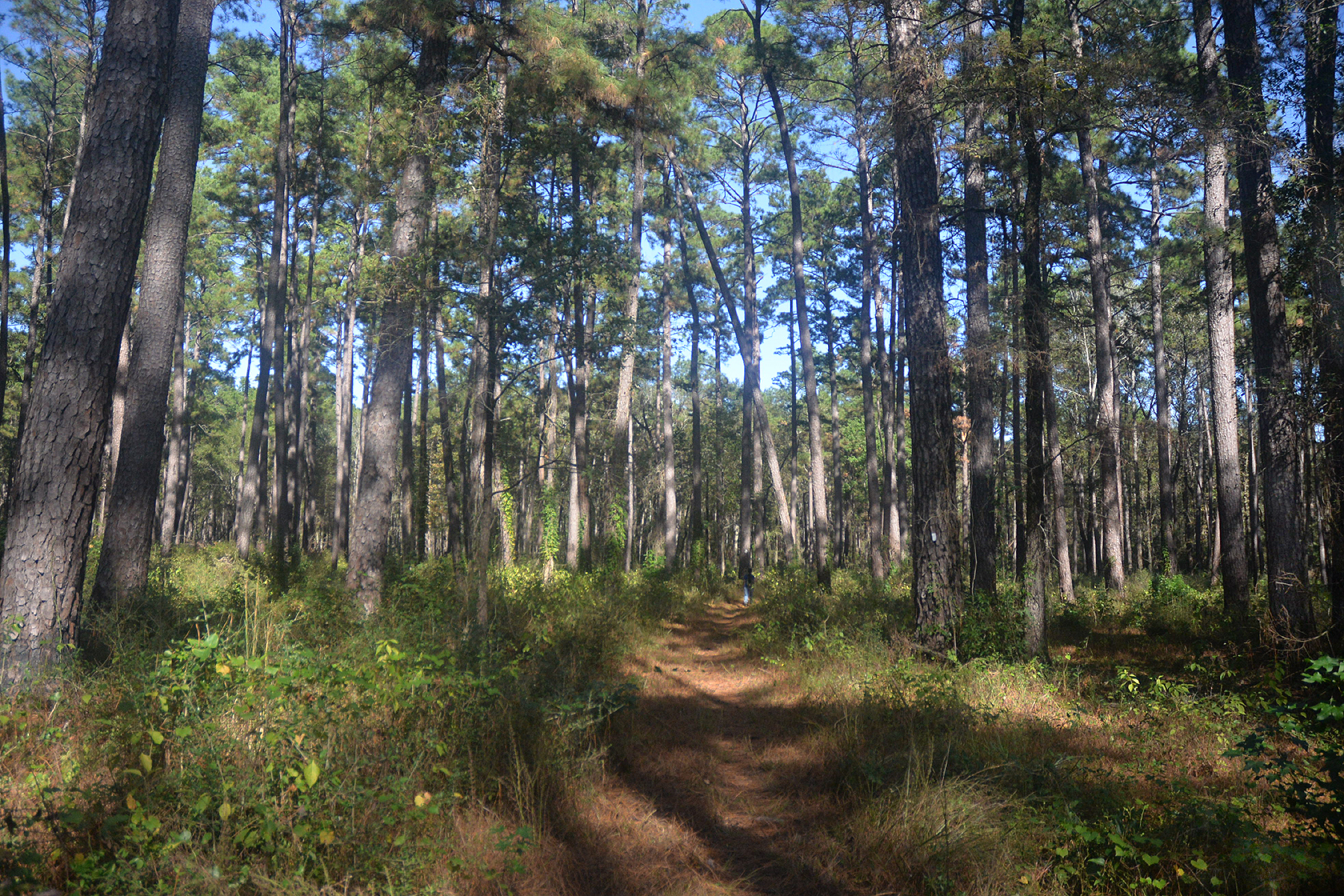
Trail between the Little Lake Creek Wilderness and Stubblefield Lake

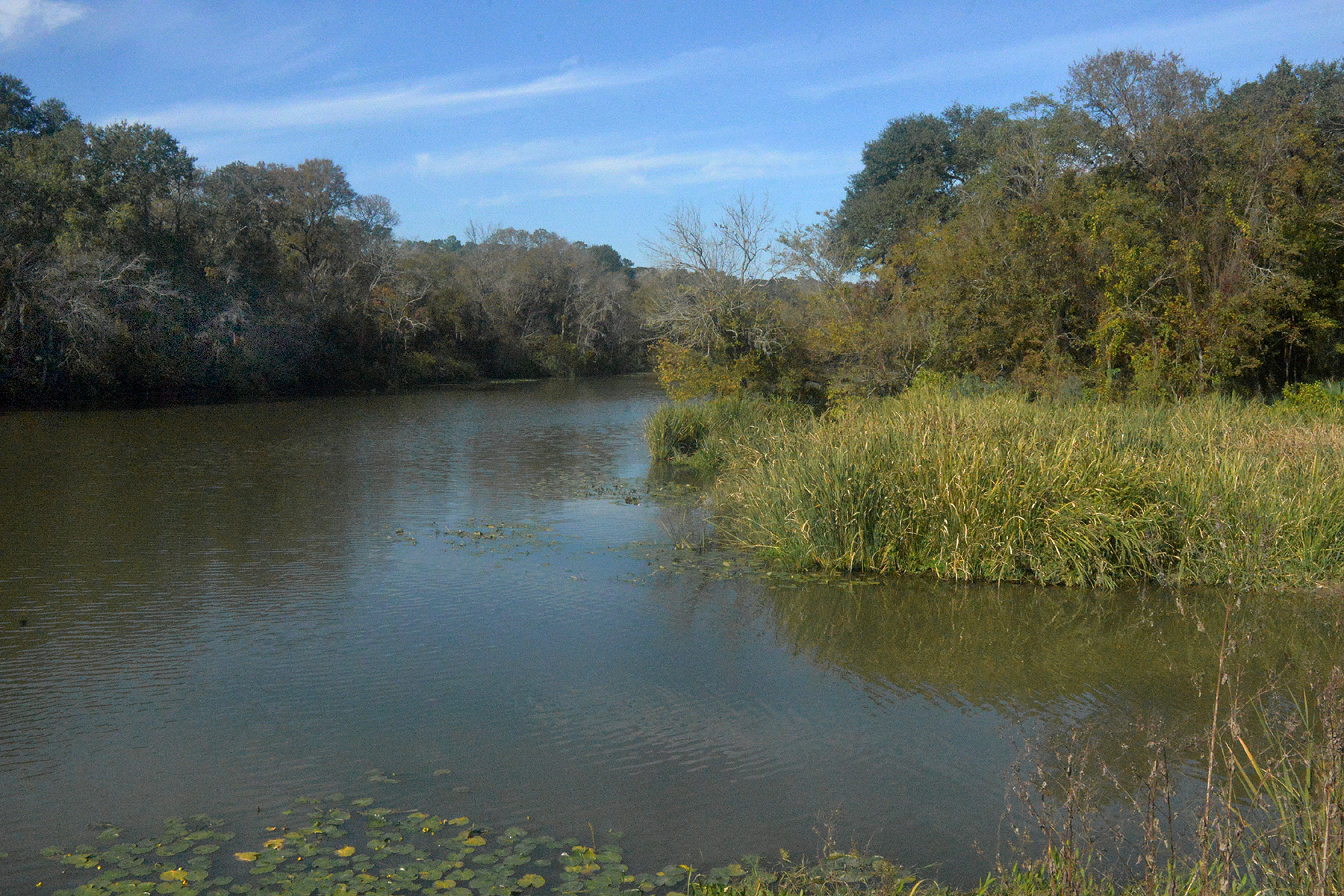
Stubblefield Lake seen from Lone Star Hiking Trail

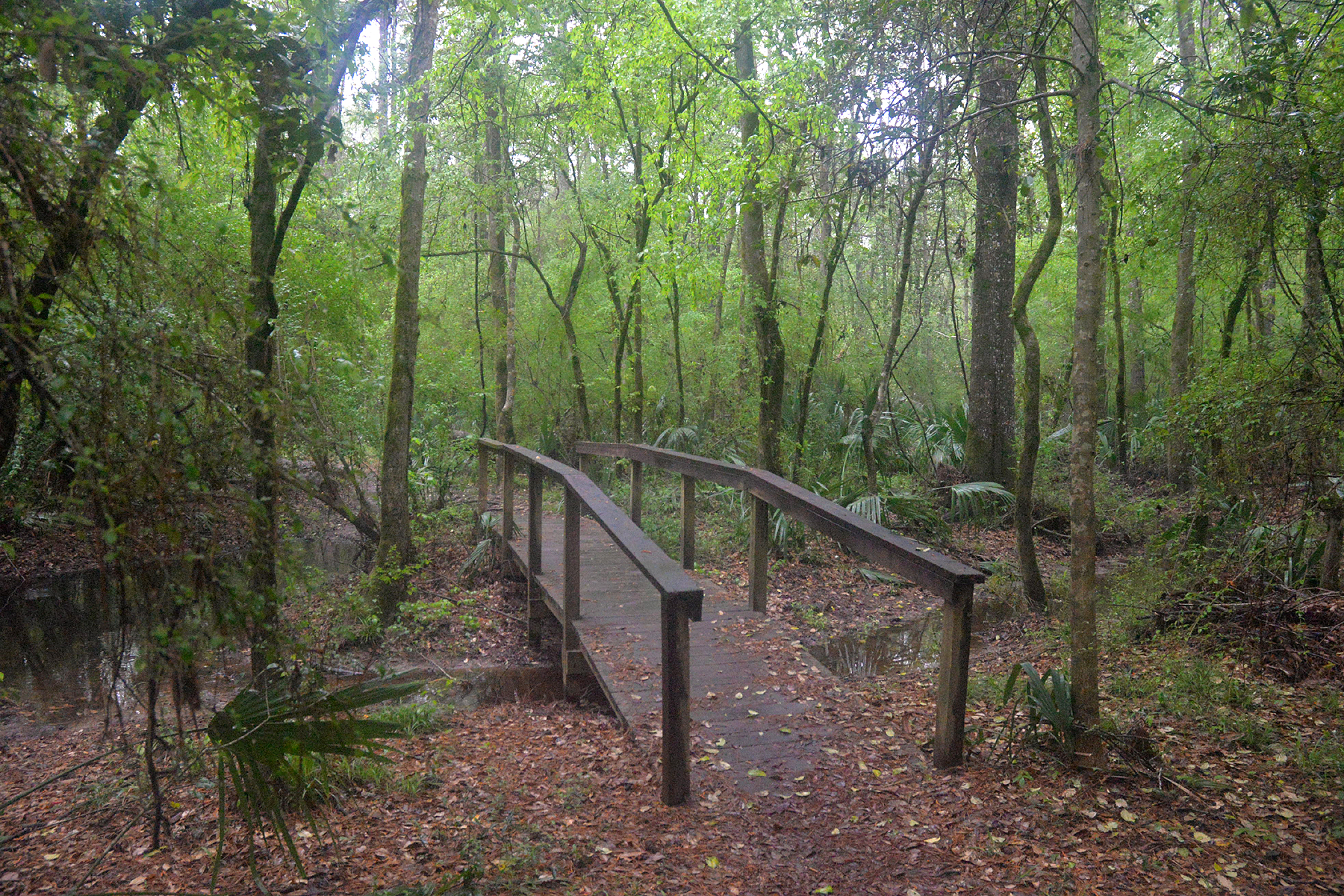
Winters Bayou Scenic Aera near the southeast end of the Trail
