= Pumpkin, Texas =

Pumpkin
- Unincorporated community
- Interactive map of Pumpkin
- Location within Texas Pumpkin (the United States)
- Coordinates: 30°32′51″N 95°17′03″W
- Country: United States
- State: Texas
- County: San Jacinto County

Pumpkin is a small, unincorporated community located in San Jacinto County, East Texas, United States. This community is settled inside of the Sam Houston National Forest.

== History ==
While most of its past history has been lost, the community is thought to have developed around 1875. The community was named after the nearby creek with the same name. By the late 20th century, Pumpkin had a store, a church, and a volunteer fire department for the remaining residents. In 2000, the population was 50.
