= New Waverly, Texas =

- City
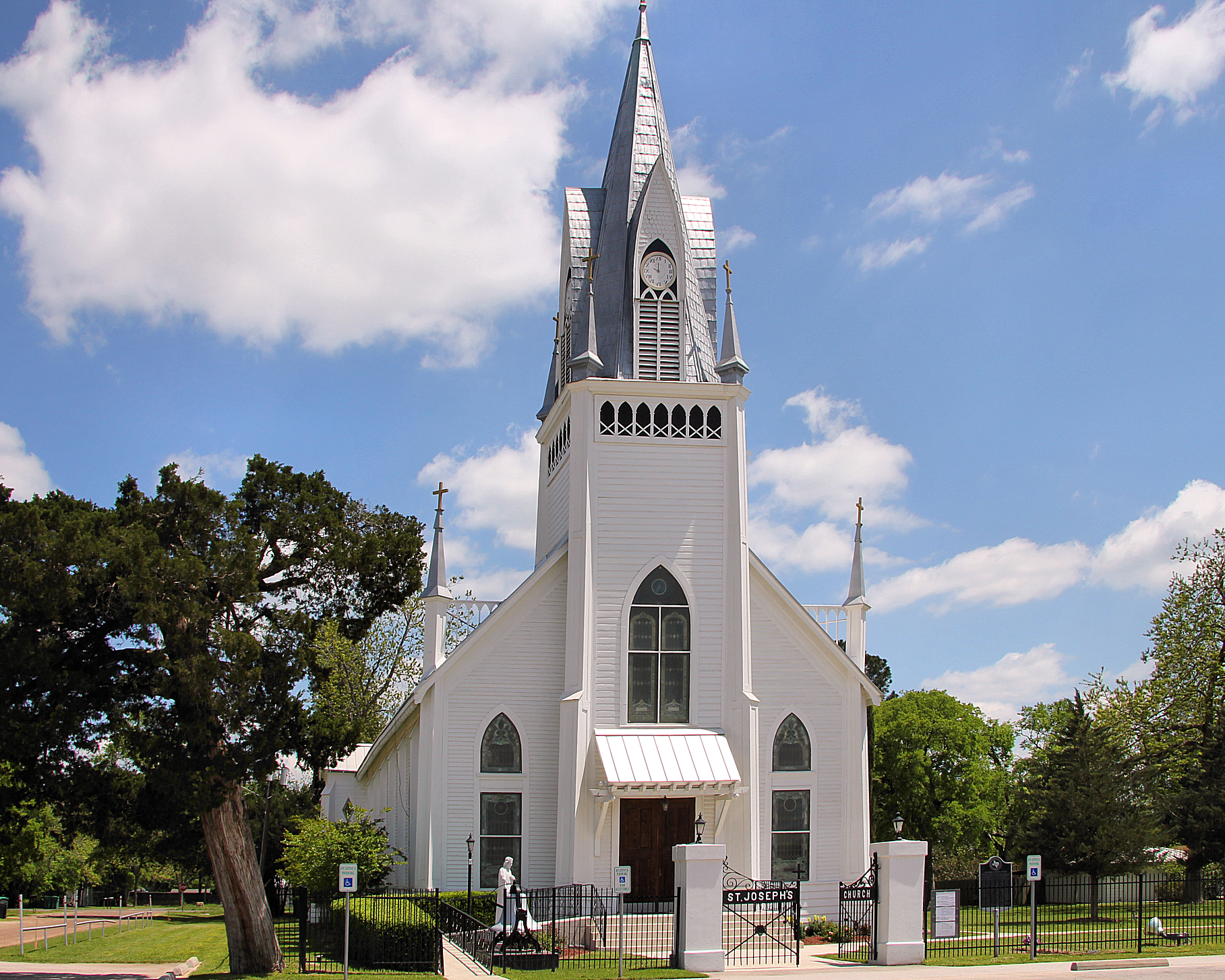
- St. Joseph's Catholic Church

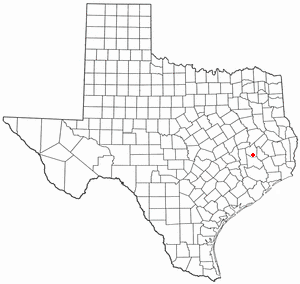
- Location of New Waverly, Texas

- Coordinates: 30°32′21″N 95°28′48″W
- Country: United States
- State: Texas
- County: Walker
- Established: <1870>

Area
  - Total: 2.22 sq mi (5.76 km^{2})
  - Land: 2.21 sq mi (5.72 km^{2})
  - Water: 0.015 sq mi (0.04 km^{2})
- Elevation: 354 ft (108 m)

Population (2020)
  - Total: 914
  - Density: 485.1/sq mi (187.31/km^{2})
- Time zone: UTC-6 (Central (CST))
  - Summer (DST): UTC-5 (CDT)
- ZIP code: 77358
- Area code: 936
- FIPS code: 48-51396
- GNIS feature ID: 1363803

New Waverly is a city in Walker County, Texas, United States. The population was 914 at the 2020 census.

== Geography ==
New Waverly is located at 30°32′21″N 95°28′48″W (30.539226, –95.479862).

According to the United States Census Bureau, the city has a total area of 2.2 square miles (5.8 km^{2}), of which 2.2 square miles (5.8 km^{2}) is land and 0.44% is water.

== Economy ==
In 2002 the New Waverly area's largest employer was Louisiana-Pacific's large plywood-manufacturing mill. As of that year most residents traveled to Conroe, Huntsville, and/or Willis to buy goods.

The Sam Houston National Forest is located nearby and operates a ranger station in the vicinity.

== History ==
Residents of Danville mostly relocated to the new railroad town of Willis, Texas around 1870 and the town declined further when the old Houston road (U.S. Highway 75) was rerouted through New Waverly.

== Demographics ==
Historical population
| Census | Pop. | Note | %± |
|---|---|---|---|
| 1880 | 70 | | — |
| 1960 | 426 | | — |
| 1970 | 496 | | 16.4% |
| 1980 | 824 | | 66.1% |
| 1990 | 936 | | 13.6% |
| 2000 | 950 | | 1.5% |
| 2010 | 1,032 | | 8.6% |
| 2020 | 914 | | −11.4% |
U.S. Decennial Census

=== 2020 census ===
As of the 2020 census, there were 914 people, 350 households, and 215 families residing in the city.

The median age was 36.8 years. 28.2% of residents were under the age of 18 and 16.1% of residents were 65 years of age or older. For every 100 females there were 94.1 males, and for every 100 females age 18 and over there were 92.9 males age 18 and over.

Of the 350 households, 38.0% had children under the age of 18 living in them. Of all households, 41.1% were married-couple households, 20.0% were households with a male householder and no spouse or partner present, and 33.4% were households with a female householder and no spouse or partner present. About 28.0% of all households were made up of individuals and 12.9% had someone living alone who was 65 years of age or older.

There were 410 housing units, of which 14.6% were vacant. The homeowner vacancy rate was 3.3% and the rental vacancy rate was 11.3%.

0.0% of residents lived in urban areas, while 100.0% lived in rural areas.

Racial composition as of the 2020 census
| Race | Number | Percent |
|---|---|---|
| White | 545 | 59.6% |
| Black or African American | 232 | 25.4% |
| American Indian and Alaska Native | 4 | 0.4% |
| Asian | 8 | 0.9% |
| Native Hawaiian and Other Pacific Islander | 0 | 0.0% |
| Some other race | 68 | 7.4% |
| Two or more races | 57 | 6.2% |
| Hispanic or Latino (of any race) | 133 | 14.6% |

=== 2000 census ===
As of the census of 2000, there were 950 people, 378 households, and 255 families residing in the city. The population density was 423.4 inhabitants per square mile (163.5/km^{2}). There were 418 housing units at an average density of 186.3 per square mile (71.9/km^{2}). The racial makeup of the city was 62.21% White, 31.47% African American, 0.32% Native American, 0.11% Asian, 0.11% Pacific Islander, 4.00% from other races, and 1.79% from two or more races. Hispanic or Latino of any race were 5.68% of the population.

There were 378 households, out of which 32.8% had children under the age of 18 living with them, 45.0% were married couples living together, 19.0% had a female householder with no husband present, and 32.5% were non-families. 30.2% of all households were made up of individuals, and 14.6% had someone living alone who was 65 years of age or older. The average household size was 2.51 and the average family size was 3.12.

In the city, the population was spread out, with 27.8% under the age of 18, 10.1% from 18 to 24, 26.2% from 25 to 44, 21.7% from 45 to 64, and 14.2% who were 65 years of age or older. The median age was 35 years. For every 100 females, there were 89.6 males. For every 100 females age 18 and over, there were 83.4 males.

The median income for a household in the city was $29,583, and the median income for a family was $36,250. Males had a median income of $25,938 versus $17,885 for females. The per capita income for the city was $14,475. About 17.4% of families and 21.9% of the population were below the poverty line, including 32.2% of those under age 18 and 23.9% of those age 65 or over.

=== 2019 American Community Survey ===
Based on 2019 research of residents living in poverty, 32.3% of the population for whom poverty status is determined in New Waverly, TX (367 out of 1.14k people) lived below the poverty line, which is higher than the national average of 12.3%. That includes 31.4% of White Non-Hispanic residents, 33.9% of Black residents, and 31.7% of Hispanic or Latino residents. The largest demographic living in poverty are Males 18 - 24, followed by Females 25 - 34. The median household income in New Waverly, TX is $33,700. In 2019, the place with the highest median household income in New Waverly, TX was Census Tract 7903 with a value of $57,538, followed by Census Tract 7902 and N/A, with respective values of $52,237 and N/A.

The Citizenship rate as of 2019, 99.6% of New Waverly, TX residents were US citizens, which is higher than the national average of 93.4%. In 2018, the percentage of US citizens in New Waverly, TX was 98.7%, meaning that the rate of citizenship has been increasing.

== Education ==
The City of New Waverly is served by the New Waverly Independent School District.

Gulf Coast Trades Center, a charter school specializing in vocational training for at-risk youth, is located in proximity to New Waverly.

Residents of New Waverly ISD (and therefore New Waverly) are served by the Lone Star College System (formerly North Harris-Montgomery Community College).

== Trivia ==
In 1947 writer William Burroughs lived here with his wife Joan Vollmer and their friend Herbert Huncke. During this time their son William Burroughs jr. was born.
