= Richards Independent School District =

School district in Texas, United States

Address
- 9477 Panther Dr Richards, Texas, 77873; United States

District information
- Type: Public
- Motto: Where Excellence is Expected
- Grades: PK–12
- Governing agency: Texas Education Agency
- Schools: 2
- NCES District ID: 4836990

Students and staff
- Enrollment: 179 (2018–2019)
- Teachers: 17.01 (on an FTE basis)
- Staff: 12.18 (on an FTE basis)
- Student–teacher ratio: 10.52

Other information
- Website: www.richardsisd.net

Richards Independent School District is a public school district based in the unincorporated community of Richards, Texas, United States. Located in Grimes County, the district also serves northwestern Montgomery County and a small portion of southwestern Walker County. The district has one campus with a main building housing both Richards High (Grades 7-12) and Richards Elementary (Grades K-6), a gym, and an agriculture building.

In 2018–2019, the district received a score of 82 out of 100 from the Texas Education Agency. The district received a score of 72 the previous year.
