= Walker County, Texas =

County in Texas, United States

- County
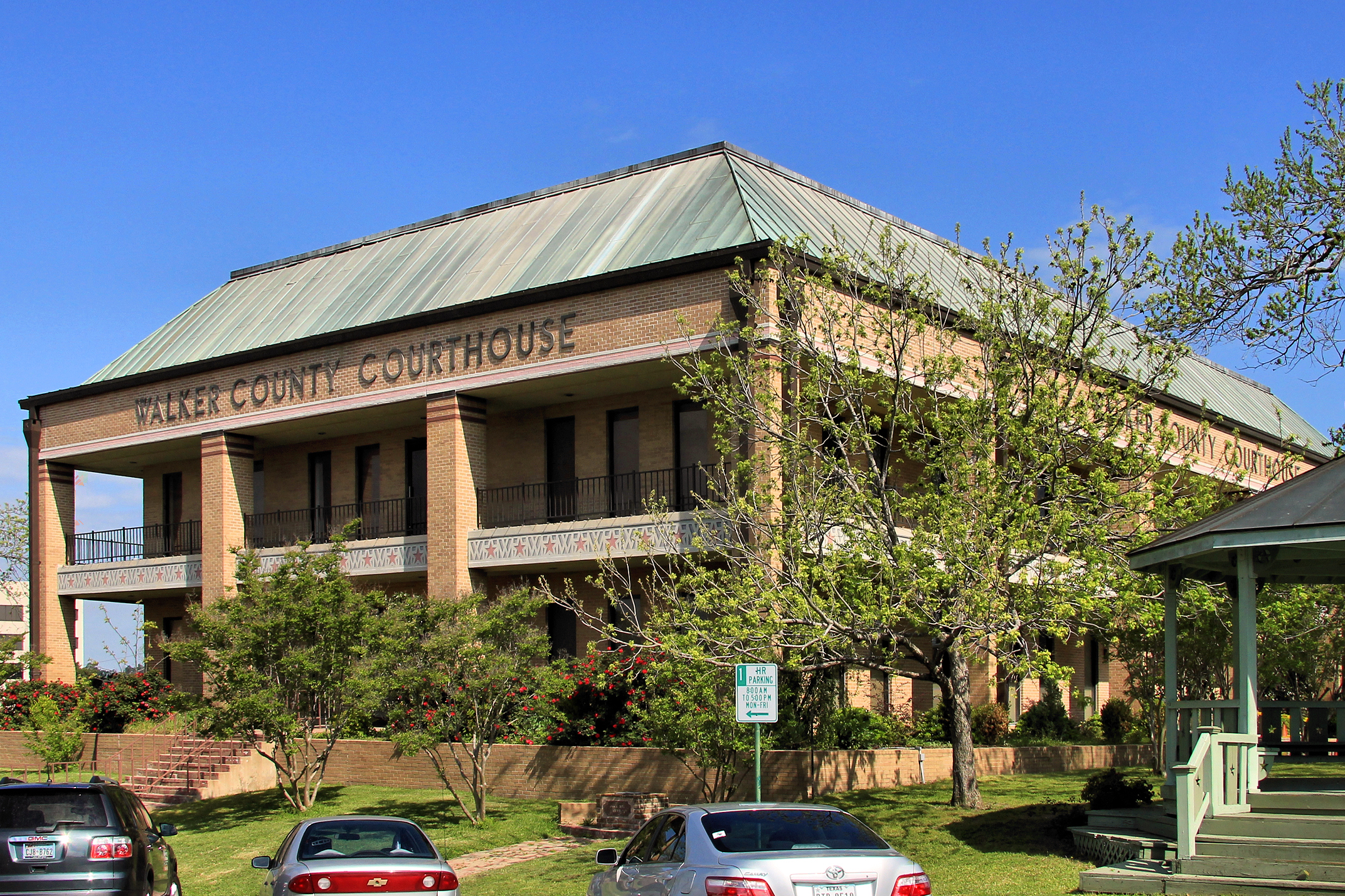
- The Walker County Courthouse in 2014

- Location within the U.S. state of Texas
- Coordinates: 30°44′N 95°34′W
- Country: United States
- State: Texas
- Founded: 1846
- Named for: Robert J. Walker, renamed for Samuel H. Walker
- Seat: Huntsville
- Largest city: Huntsville

Area
  - Total: 802 sq mi (2,080 km^{2})
  - Land: 784 sq mi (2,030 km^{2})
  - Water: 17 sq mi (44 km^{2}) 2.2%

Population (2020)
  - Total: 76,400
  - Estimate (2025): 83,842 ▲
  - Density: 97.4/sq mi (37.6/km^{2})
- Time zone: UTC−6 (Central)
  - Summer (DST): UTC−5 (CDT)
- Congressional districts: 8th, 17th
- Website: www.co.walker.tx.us

Walker County is a county located in the east-central section of the U.S. state of Texas. As of the 2020 census, its population was 76,400. Its county seat is Huntsville. Initially, Walker County was named for Robert J. Walker, a legislator from Mississippi, who introduced into the United States Congress the resolution to annex Texas. Walker later supported the U.S. during its Civil War and earned some enmity for it. To keep the county's name, the state renamed it for Samuel H. Walker (no relation), a Texas Ranger and soldier in the United States Army.

Walker County comprises the Huntsville micropolitan statistical area that is part of the Houston–Pasadena–The Woodlands combined statistical area.

== Geography ==
According to the U.S. Census Bureau, the county has a total area of 802 square miles (2,080 km^{2}), of which 17 sq mi (44 km^{2}) (2.2%) are covered by water.

=== Major highways ===
- Interstate 45
- U.S. Highway 190
- State Highway 19
- State Highway 30
- State Highway 75
- State Highway 150
- Spur 59

=== Adjacent counties ===
- Houston County (north)
- Trinity County (northeast)
- San Jacinto County (east)
- Montgomery County (south)
- Grimes County (west)
- Madison County (northwest)

=== National protected area ===
- Sam Houston National Forest (part)

== Demographics ==
Historical population
Census	Pop.	Note	%±
1850	3,964		—
1860	8,191		106.6%
1870	9,766		19.2%
1880	12,024		23.1%
1890	12,874		7.1%
1900	15,813		22.8%
1910	16,061		1.6%
1920	18,556		15.5%
1930	18,528		−0.2%
1940	19,868		7.2%
1950	20,163		1.5%
1960	21,475		6.5%
1970	27,680		28.9%
1980	41,789		51.0%
1990	50,917		21.8%
2000	61,758		21.3%
2010	67,861		9.9%
2020	76,400		12.6%
2025 (est.)	83,842	▲	9.7%
U.S. Decennial Census; 1850–2010 2010–2020

=== Racial and ethnic composition ===
Walker County, Texas – Racial and ethnic composition Note: the US Census treats Hispanic/Latino as an ethnic category. This table excludes Latinos from the racial categories and assigns them to a separate category. Hispanics/Latinos may be of any race.
Race / Ethnicity (NH = Non-Hispanic)	Pop 1980	Pop 1990	Pop 2000	Pop 2010	Pop 2020	% 1980	% 1990	% 2000	% 2010	% 2020
White alone (NH)	28,191	32,856	37,090	39,671	39,823	67.46%	64.53%	60.06%	58.46%	52.12%
Black or African American alone (NH)	10,047	12,050	14,672	15,098	16,382	24.04%	23.67%	23.76%	22.25%	21.44%
Native American or Alaska Native alone (NH)	133	147	169	186	251	0.32%	0.29%	0.27%	0.27%	0.33%
Asian alone (NH)	200	301	464	617	1,126	0.48%	0.59%	0.75%	0.91%	1.47%
Native Hawaiian or Pacific Islander alone (NH)	x	x	25	19	39	x	x	0.04%	0.03%	0.05%
Other race alone (NH)	246	70	70	72	318	0.59%	0.14%	0.11%	0.11%	0.42%
Mixed race or Multiracial (NH)	x	x	556	809	1,883	x	x	0.90%	1.19%	2.46%
Hispanic or Latino (any race)	2,972	5,493	8,712	11,389	16,578	7.11%	10.79%	14.11%	16.78%	21.70%
Total	41,789	50,917	61,758	67,861	76,400	100.00%	100.00%	100.00%	100.00%	100.00%

=== 2020 census ===
As of the 2020 census, the county had a population of 76,400. The median age was 36.9 years. 15.1% of residents were under the age of 18 and 14.1% of residents were 65 years of age or older. For every 100 females there were 138.3 males, and for every 100 females age 18 and over there were 144.4 males.

The racial makeup of the county was 56.0% White, 21.8% Black or African American, 0.6% American Indian and Alaska Native, 1.5% Asian, 0.1% Native Hawaiian and Pacific Islander, 13.2% from some other race, and 6.8% from two or more races. Hispanic or Latino residents of any race comprised 21.7% of the population.

56.8% of residents lived in urban areas, while 43.2% lived in rural areas.

There were 24,568 households in the county, of which 24.9% had children under the age of 18 living in them. Of all households, 39.0% were married-couple households, 24.0% were households with a male householder and no spouse or partner present, and 31.6% were households with a female householder and no spouse or partner present. About 32.0% of all households were made up of individuals and 10.6% had someone living alone who was 65 years of age or older.

There were 28,632 housing units, of which 14.2% were vacant. Among occupied housing units, 53.1% were owner-occupied and 46.9% were renter-occupied. The homeowner vacancy rate was 1.9% and the rental vacancy rate was 11.2%.

=== 2000 census ===
As of the 2000 census, 61,758 people, 18,303 households, and 11,384 families resided in the county. The population density was 78 people per square mile (30 people/km^{2}). The 21,099 housing units had an average density of 27 units per square mile (10 units/km^{2}). The racial makeup of the county was 69.12% White, 23.88% African American, 0.35% Native American, 0.77% Asian, 0.05% Pacific Islander, 4.42% from other races, and 1.41% from two or more races. About 14.11% of the population were Hispanics or Latinos of any race.

Of the 18,303 households, 28.7% had children under 18 living with them, 46.8% were married couples living together, 11.7% had a female householder with no husband present, and 37.8% were not families. Around 27.0% of all households were made up of individuals, and 8.0% had someone living alone who was 65 or older. The average household size was 2.44 and the average family size was 3.02.

In the county, the age distribution was 18.0% under 18, 23.0% from 18 to 24, 31.1% from 25 to 44, 18.9% from 45 to 64, and 8.9% who were 65 or older. The median age was 31 years. For every 100 females, there were 151.1 males. For every 100 females age 18 and over, there were 161.9 males (numbers are skewed from normal due to men's prison population).

The median income for a household in the county was $31,468, and for a family was $42,589. Males had a median income of $27,634 versus $22,579 for females. The per capita income for the county was $14,508. About 10.6% of families and 18.4% of the population were below the poverty line, including 19.1% of those under 18 and 13.4% of those 65 or over.

== Education ==
Sam Houston State University is located in Huntsville.

School districts serving portions of the county include:

- Huntsville Independent School District
- New Waverly Independent School District
- Richards Independent School District (portion)
- Trinity Independent School District (portion)

The Gulf Coast Trades Center, a charter school, is in an unincorporated area of the county.

The Huntsville and New Waverly ISDs are assigned to Lone Star College. Areas of Walker County in Trinity ISD are assigned to Angelina College. The portion of Richards ISD in Walker County is zoned to Blinn College.

== Government and infrastructure ==
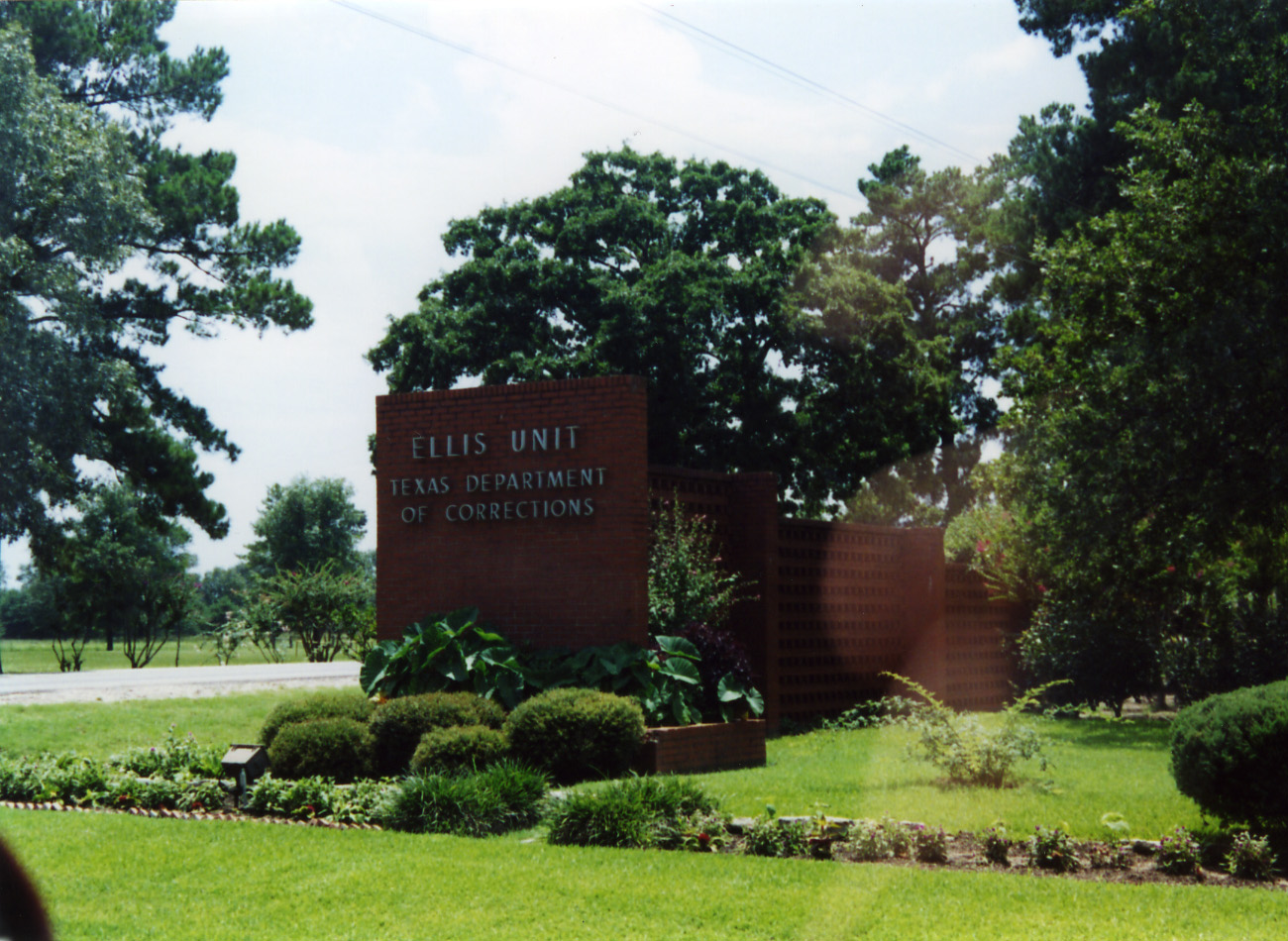
Ellis Unit, a prison in unincorporated Walker County

The headquarters of the Texas Department of Criminal Justice (TDCJ), the Texas agency that operates adult state correctional facilities, are in Huntsville.

Walker County has the highest number of state prisons and jails of all of the counties in Texas. Several TDCJ prisons for men, including the Byrd Unit, the Goree Unit, the Huntsville Unit, and the Wynne Unit, are in the Huntsville city limits. The Holliday Unit, a transfer unit, is in Huntsville. In addition the Ellis Unit and the Estelle Unit are in unincorporated areas of Walker County. The Huntsville Unit houses the State of Texas execution chamber.

=== Politics ===
Like most of Texas, Walker County was solidly Democratic for the first half of the 20th century. Before 1972, the only time a Republican carried the county was in 1956, and it became a Republican stronghold afterwards, with only one candidate carrying the county from that point forward.

United States presidential election results for Walker County, Texas
Year	Republican		Democratic		Third party(ies)	
Year	No.	%	No.	%	No.	%
1912	323	30.88%	631	60.33%	92	8.80%
1916	315	28.56%	763	69.17%	25	2.27%
1920	404	23.45%	788	45.73%	531	30.82%
1924	201	10.07%	1,792	89.78%	3	0.15%
1928	488	39.51%	747	60.49%	0	0.00%
1932	83	4.36%	1,811	95.17%	9	0.47%
1936	69	3.86%	1,715	96.02%	2	0.11%
1940	218	9.18%	2,158	90.82%	0	0.00%
1944	145	7.12%	1,638	80.41%	254	12.47%
1948	570	22.23%	1,439	56.12%	555	21.65%
1952	1,897	47.71%	2,078	52.26%	1	0.03%
1956	1,991	59.86%	1,287	38.70%	48	1.44%
1960	1,750	48.57%	1,832	50.85%	21	0.58%
1964	1,557	35.10%	2,877	64.86%	2	0.05%
1968	1,946	33.62%	2,391	41.30%	1,452	25.08%
1972	5,082	63.20%	2,940	36.56%	19	0.24%
1976	4,974	48.90%	5,105	50.19%	92	0.90%
1980	5,657	51.87%	4,869	44.65%	380	3.48%
1984	8,809	67.24%	4,263	32.54%	28	0.21%
1988	8,473	58.88%	5,826	40.48%	92	0.64%
1992	6,662	41.84%	5,619	35.29%	3,643	22.88%
1996	7,177	49.27%	6,088	41.79%	1,302	8.94%
2000	9,076	63.14%	4,943	34.39%	355	2.47%
2004	11,710	65.71%	5,977	33.54%	135	0.76%
2008	11,623	60.71%	7,334	38.31%	189	0.99%
2012	12,140	64.97%	6,252	33.46%	293	1.57%
2016	12,884	65.08%	6,091	30.77%	821	4.15%
2020	15,375	64.99%	7,884	33.32%	399	1.69%
2024	17,515	69.57%	7,461	29.64%	199	0.79%

United States Senate election results for Walker County, Texas1
Year	Republican		Democratic		Third party(ies)	
Year	No.	%	No.	%	No.	%
2024	16,775	67.16%	7,728	30.94%	475	1.90%

United States Senate election results for Walker County, Texas2
Year	Republican		Democratic		Third party(ies)	
Year	No.	%	No.	%	No.	%
2020	15,480	65.94%	7,414	31.58%	583	2.48%
2026	12,644	58.46%	8,515	39.37%	469	2.17%

Texas Gubernatorial election results for Walker County
Year	Republican		Democratic		Third party(ies)	
Year	No.	%	No.	%	No.	%
2022	12,309	70.78%	4,861	27.95%	220	1.27%
2026	13,160	60.65%	8,217	37.87%	320	1.47%

== Communities ==
=== Cities ===
- Huntsville (county seat)
- New Waverly
- Riverside

=== Unincorporated community ===
- Dodge

== Notable people ==
- Eugene C. Barker
- Marilyn McAdams Sibley
- Sherri Ann Jarvis, previously unidentified teenager found murdered on November 1, 1980
- Slater Martin, basketball Player

== See also ==
- National Register of Historic Places listings in Walker County, Texas
- Recorded Texas Historic Landmarks in Walker County
- John N. Raney
- Kate Borcherding
