= New Waverly Independent School District =

School district in Texas

Address
- 355 Front Street New Waverly, Texas, 77358; United States

District information
- Type: Public
- Grades: PK–12
- Schools: 4
- NCES District ID: 4832640

Students and staff
- Students: 1,066 (2023–2024)
- Teachers: 83.07 (on an FTE basis) (2023–2024)
- Staff: 80.43 (on an FTE basis) (2023–2024)
- Student–teacher ratio: 12.83 (2023–2024)

Other information
- Website: www.new-waverly.k12.tx.us

New Waverly Independent School District is a public school district based in New Waverly, Texas (USA). A small portion of New Waverly ISD also goes into the city limits of Huntsville.

In 2009, the school district was rated "academically acceptable" by the Texas Education Agency.

== Schools ==
- New Waverly High (Grades 9-12)
- New Waverly Junior High (Grades 6-8)
- New Waverly Intermediate (Grades 4-5)
- New Waverly Elementary (Grades PK-3)
