= Gulf Coast Trades Center =

School in Texas, United States

Coordinates: 30.5407°N 95.5567°W

Gulf Coast Trades Center / Raven School (GCTC) is a charter boarding school located in unincorporated Walker County, Texas, near New Waverly. The school, operated by the nonprofit agency Gulf Coast Trades Center Inc., is in proximity to Houston.

The school, located within the Sam Houston National Forest, is a center for adjudicated children, who can learn construction trades. GCTC is an alternative to being committed into the Texas Juvenile Justice Department (TJJD) (previously the Texas Youth Commission, TYC). GCTC functions as a contract facility for the state juvenile prison system.

== History ==
The school first opened in 1971. John Arlen Driskell, Sr., background in Criminal Justice, was one of the Founders of GCTC. John served as the Director & President of GCTC until Jan. 1976, moving he & his family to Houston County, Texas. Thomas "Mike" Buzbee Sr. took over the position as President and CEO of the center, 1976 until his 2007 death. The school was named after the Gulf Coast Building Trades Council and the Houston Mayor's Office, the founders of the school's private component. Originally the school was affiliated with the Houston Independent School District (HISD). In 1988 the school ended ties with HISD.

From 1984 to 1988 the U.S. Department of Education distributed $1.3 million in Pell Grant funds to GCTC. In 1988 the U.S. Department of Education audited the GCTC and asked for the 1.3 million back. In July 1988 the department revoked GCTC's authority to award grants, with the revocation date retroactively being March 1984. In 1990 the GCTC sued the U.S. Department of Education in federal court, asking for the authority to distribute Pell Grants.

In 2001 the report of the study "Less Cost, More Safety: Guiding Lights for Reform in Juvenile Justice" of the American Youth Policy Forum praised the GCTC.

As of 2007 about 800 children were enrolled at the school. Most of them are between 16 and 19 years of age.

In 2009 the students built a neighborhood for disabled people and low-income seniors in an unincorporated area of Montgomery County, near Willis.

== Admissions ==
In order to attend the GCTC, a prospective student must be an "at-risk" adjudicated youth referred from a county or state agency that serves youth. Agencies which refer students to the GCTC include over forty county juvenile probation departments, the Texas Department of Family and Protective Services, and the Texas Juvenile Justice Department (TJJD). Prior to the formation of the TJJD, the Texas Youth Commission (TYC) was the youth prison agency. Students admitted must be between the ages of 14 and 18. The school houses children who were unsuccessful in their probation programs.

== Academics ==
Each student takes academic and shop training. Each student builds four houses per year.

Vocational courses offered by the school include automotive, bricklaying/masonry, building maintenance, building trades, business information management, culinary arts.

The Raven School, established in 1998, provides academic educational services.

Substance Abuse Programs and other counseling services are made available to students but are not mandatory. Licensed individuals contracted from an outside vendor provide services on a daily basis. Credentialed individuals carry either LCDC (Licensed Chemical Dependency Counselor) or LPC (Licensed Professional Counselor).

== Campus ==
The 57-acre (23 ha) campus is located in the Sam Houston National Forest. It includes the 10,000-square-foot (930 m^{2}) GCTC Administration Building, the Family/Life/Visitor Center, a gymnasium, eight dormitories, an infirmary, and a cafeteria. The Family/Life/Visitor Center includes visitor facilities and banquet and meeting facilities. In addition, the north side of that building houses the school's information technology and social services departments, while the south side of the building houses the counselor and the residential department managers and supervisors. The cafeteria opened in 1982 and can seat up to 200 people. The vocational training class area is located in the south side of the facility. The gymnasium opened in March 2004.
