= Richards, Texas =

- Census-designated place
- Interactive map of Richards, Texas
- Coordinates: 30°32′12″N 95°50′46″W
- Country: United States
- State: Texas
- County: Grimes
- Elevation: 315 ft (96 m)

Population (2020)
  - Total: 184
- Time zone: UTC-6 (Central (CST))
  - Summer (DST): UTC-5 (CDT)
- Postal code: 77873
- Area code: 936
- GNIS feature ID: 2805783

Richards is an unincorporated community and census-designated place (CDP) in eastern Grimes County, Texas, United States. As of the 2020 census, Richards had a population of 184. The community is located on Farm roads 1486 and 149. The Chicago, Rock Island and Pacific Railroad line passes the east side of the community and Lake Creek flows past to the east.

== Education ==
The Richards Independent School District, Montgomery Independent School District and Anderson-Shiro Consolidated School District serve area students.

== Climate ==
The climate in this area is characterized by hot, humid summers and generally mild to cool winters. According to the Köppen Climate Classification system, Richards has a humid subtropical climate, abbreviated "Cfa" on climate maps.

== Demographics ==
Historical population
Census	Pop.	Note	%±
2020	184		—
U.S. Decennial Census; 1850–1900 1910; 1920 1930 1940; 1950 1960 1970; 1980 1990 2000; 2010 2020

Richards first appeared as a census designated place in the 2020 U.S. census.

=== 2020 census ===
Richards CDP, Texas – Racial and ethnic composition Note: the US Census treats Hispanic/Latino as an ethnic category. This table excludes Latinos from the racial categories and assigns them to a separate category. Hispanics/Latinos may be of any race.
Race / Ethnicity (NH = Non-Hispanic)	Pop 2020	% 2020
White alone (NH)	140	76.09%
Black or African American alone (NH)	19	10.33%
Native American or Alaska Native alone (NH)	1	0.54%
Asian alone (NH)	0	0.00%
Native Hawaiian or Pacific Islander alone (NH)	0	0.00%
Other race alone (NH)	3	1.63%
Mixed race or Multiracial (NH)	4	2.17%
Hispanic or Latino (any race)	17	9.24%
Total	184	100.00%
