= Sam Houston National Forest =

National forest in east Texas

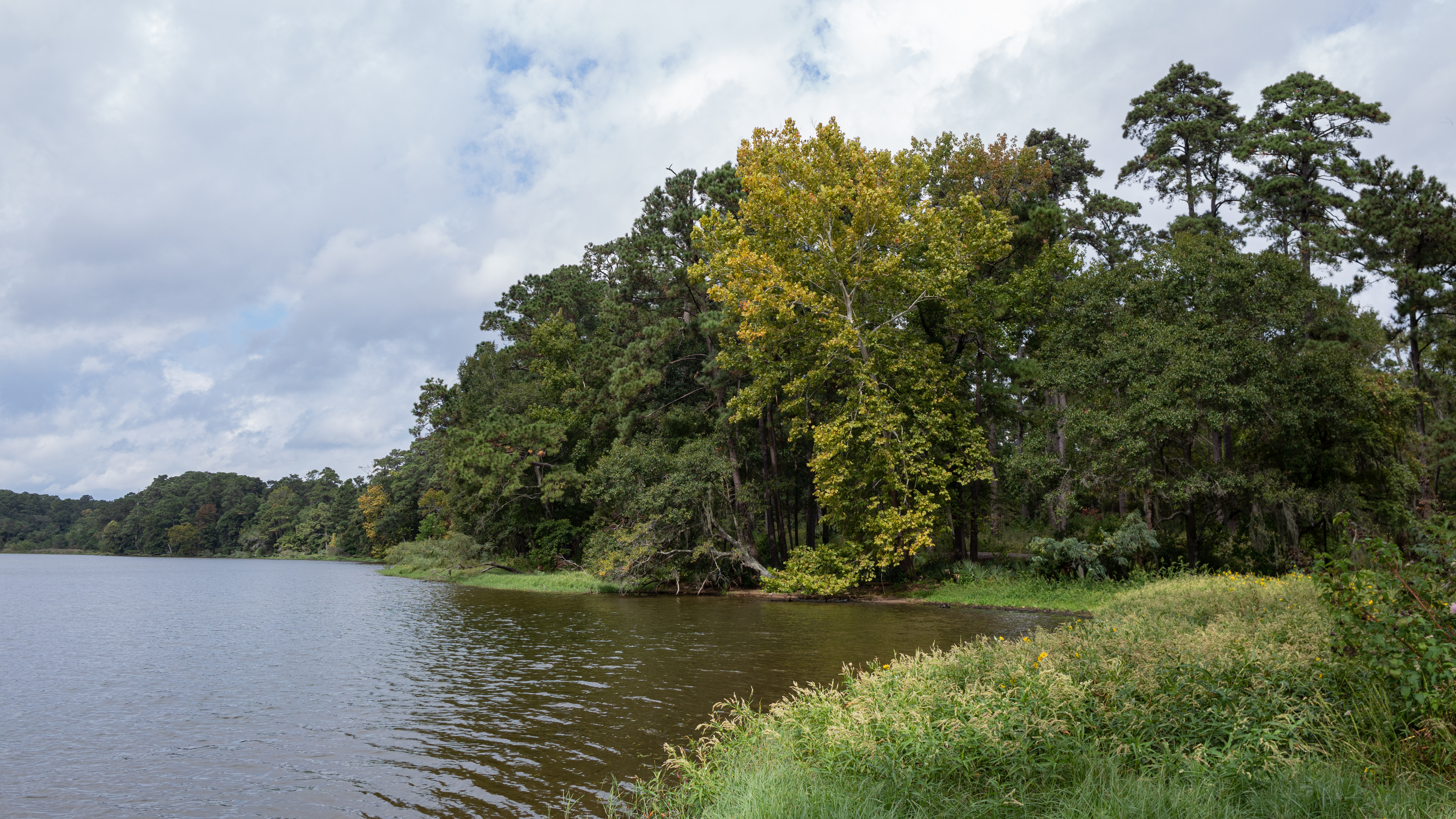
- Lake Conroe, Sam Houston National Forest

- Location within the United States
- Location: San Jacinto, Walker, and Montgomery counties, Texas, U.S.
- Nearest city: New Waverly, TX
- Coordinates: 30°35′04″N 95°07′57″W
- Area: 163,045 acres (659.82 km^{2})
- Established: October 13, 1936
- Governing body: U.S. Forest Service
- Website: Sam Houston National Forest

The Sam Houston National Forest, one of four national forests in Texas, is located 50 miles north of Houston. The forest is administered together with the other three United States National Forests and two National Grasslands located entirely in Texas, from common offices in Lufkin, Texas. The units include Angelina, Davy Crockett, Sabine, and Sam Houston National Forests, plus Caddo National Grassland and Lyndon B. Johnson National Grassland. There are local ranger district offices located in New Waverly. It is located in portions of three Texas counties including Montgomery, San Jacinto, and Walker.

== Climate ==
Summers in the Sam Houston National Forest are hot and humid and winters generally are short and mild. The average summer temperature is 83 °F (28 °C), but mid-summer temperatures often reach the upper 90s °F (30s °C). The average winter temperature is 53 °F (12 °C). Rarely do temperatures drop to less than 10 °F (-12 °C) or rise to over 110 °F (43 °C). The average rainfall is 44 inches (1.1 m). Normally dryer periods occur during September – October and February – March.

== Early history ==
The three counties that contain the Sam Houston National Forest, Montgomery, San Jacinto, and Walker, have yielded evidence of human occupation dating back 12,000 years. More recently, the basins of the San Jacinto and Trinity Rivers were home to Atakapan-speaking groups known as the Bidai, Patiri, Deadose, and Akokisa. Primarily hunters and gatherers, some from these groups may have practiced some form of agriculture. Disease and oppression from European settlers led to their eventual extinction in the early 19th century. Evidence of occupations from as early as 7,000 years ago to the 20th century has been documented by a number of archaeological sites within the national forest.

== Multiple-use management ==
The Sam Houston National Forest is managed under the multiple-use concept. Under this concept, the uses of the forest, such as recreation, fish and wildlife, timber, grazing, soil and water, and minerals, are planned to maintain a balance among the benefits, yet provide for public needs. Forest Service objectives, by law, must consider all resources of the forest and no single resource can be emphasized to the detriment of others.

In 1960, the Multiple Use-Sustained Yield Act put into law what had been practiced on the National Forests in Texas for almost 30 years. This act emphasized that resources on public lands would be managed so that they are used in the combination that will best meet the needs of the people, that the benefits obtained will exist indefinitely and that each natural resource would be managed in balance with other resources to meet present and future public needs.

Management plans outline direction for a forest under the multiple-use concept. However, even the most carefully planned system of management cannot foresee environmental or natural factors which can cause drastic changes in a forest. Fire, storms, insects and disease, for example, can alter the way a forest is managed.

== Recreation ==
=== Hiking ===
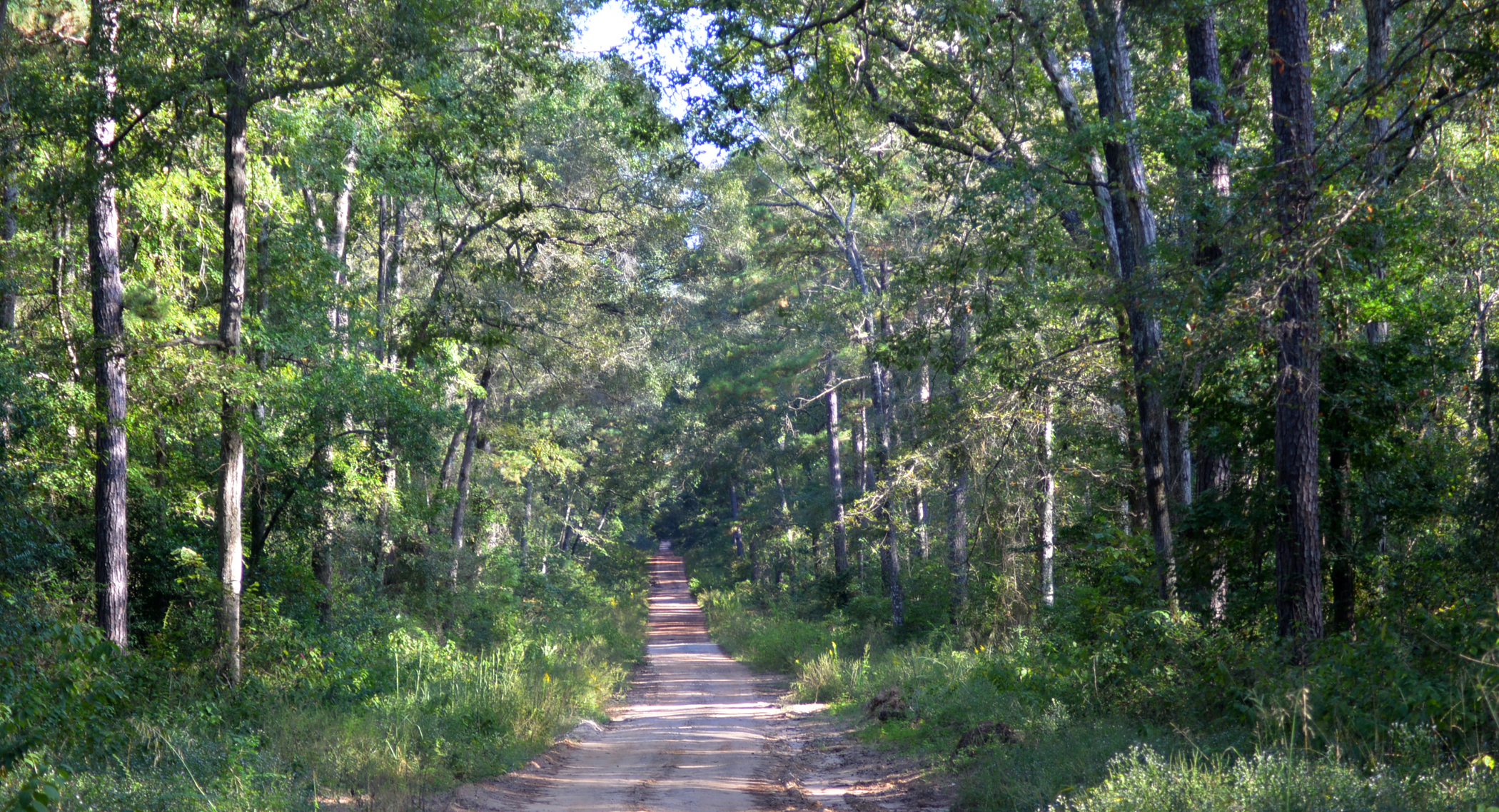
A forest road in San Jacinto County

Hiking is a popular way to enjoy the forest and its beauty. The 128-mile (206 km) Lone Star Hiking Trail, a portion of which has gained National Recreation Trail status, winds through the Sam Houston National Forest. The trail, marked with two-inch by four-inch aluminum markers to guide hikers, has recreation areas available at three different points. Except during deer hunting season when camping is restricted to designated camps, primitive camping is allowed off the trail. Potable water is available at Double Lake and Stubblefield recreation areas.

Lone Star Hiking Trail consists of three major sections. The 40-mile (64 km) Lake Conroe section, lying west of Lake Conroe, begins near the intersection of FS 219 and FM 149 and has four connecting loops.

The Central Area of the trail runs eastward from Stubblefield Recreation Area, through the Four Notch area to Evergreen and then south down FM 945 to the trailhead parking lot. The Four Notch Loop, a 9.2-mile (14.8 km) section, is in the middle of this 60-mile (97 km) area of trail. The Winters Bayou/Tarkington Creek Area of the trail runs from FM 945 east to Double Lake Recreation Area, then south through Big Creek Scenic Area and then southwest through Winters Bayou. This 27-mile (43 km) section of the trail has National Recreation status.

The Lone Star Hiking Trail may be hiked year round, but winter and spring are the most popular seasons due to the mild southeast Texas climate. During deer hunting season in November and December, hikers should wear highly visible clothing. Usually the trail is not crowded, and hikers may observe a multiple-use managed forest with many ages and kinds of trees, plants and wildlife. Trail visitors may also view rivers, creeks, lakes and streams that meander through and around the Sam Houston National Forest. Off-road vehicles are prohibited.

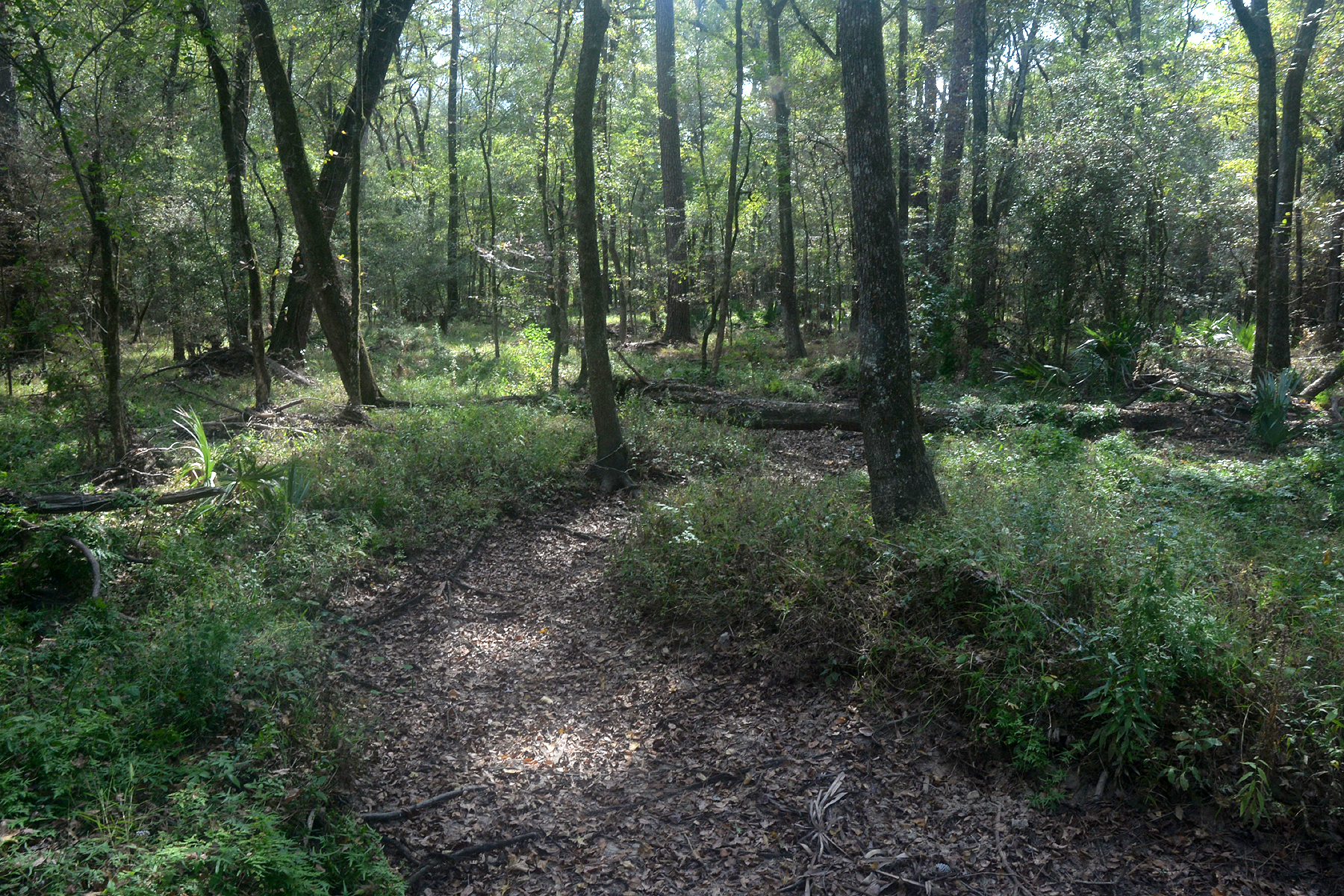
Little Lake Creek Wilderness

Little Lake Creek Wilderness - The 3,855 acres (15.6 km^{2}) Little Lake Creek Wilderness is on the western edge of the piney woods of East Texas about five miles (8 km) north of the City of Montgomery. It was designated wilderness in 1984 under the Texas Wilderness Act. The area derives its name from the perennial creek of the same name that flows south through the center. The wilderness area is bisected by three major creek drainages: Little Lake Creek, Pole Creek, and Sand Branch. Those drainages create a rich ecological mosaic. Loblolly pines (Pinus taeda) and shortleaf pines (Pinus echinata) dominate ridgetops that are separated by a wide variety of hardwoods including American elm (Ulmus americana), American sweetgum (Liquidambar styraciflua), black tupelo (Nyssa sylvatica), eastern American black walnut (Juglans nigra), and various species of hackberries (Celtis) and oaks (Quercus) along the creek channels and bottomlands. Much of the hardwood bottomlands support mature old growth forests that have not been logged since the 1920s. The area is bounded by private land to the south, FM 149 to the east, FS 211 and an abandoned pipeline right-of-way to the west, and FS 231 to the north.

Big Creek Scenic Area - The 1,420 acres (5.75 km^{2}) Big Creek Scenic Area was established in 1962 as a special interest area. Noted for its vegetative diversity and scenic qualities, the area was set aside primarily for recreational enjoyment. No camping is allowed in Big Creek Scenic Area. The Lone Star Hiking Trail goes through the scenic area offering four trail loops of various lengths for hikers to enjoy. Big Creek Scenic Area is approximately six miles west of Shepherd, and a parking lot is conveniently located off FS 217.

=== Camping ===
There are three developed campgrounds in the Sam Houston National Forest (Cagle, Double Lake and Stubblefield Recreation areas). Double Lake facilities are available by reservations or on a first-come, first-served basis if site has not previously reserved. Cagle and Stubblefield are available on a first-come, first-served basis only. Reservation can be completed by calling the National Recreation Service at 1/877/444-6777 or by internet at www.recreation.gov

Cagle Recreation Area is located along the shoreline of Lake Conroe on the west fork of the San Jacinto River. Cagle is a new campground with full service hook-ups. It has a boat ramp with large parking lot, 48 camping spurs with electric, fresh-water and sewer connections, hot showers with restrooms, lakeshore hiking and bicycle trails, wildlife viewing, Lake Conroe boating and water sports, fishing, a picnic area overlooking Lake Conroe, shoreline wading and swimming, 85 miles (137 km) of off-road vehicle (ORV), equestrian and mountain bike trails close as well as 129 miles (208 km) of hiking on the Lone Star Hiking Trail. This area is covered with beautiful large pine and hardwood trees plus thousands of colorful wildflowers. Mid February redbud tree blossoms followed by dogwood tree blossoms in early March are a spectacular outdoor flower show. Cagle is five miles west of Interstate 45 on state road FM-1375 at New Waverly, Texas.

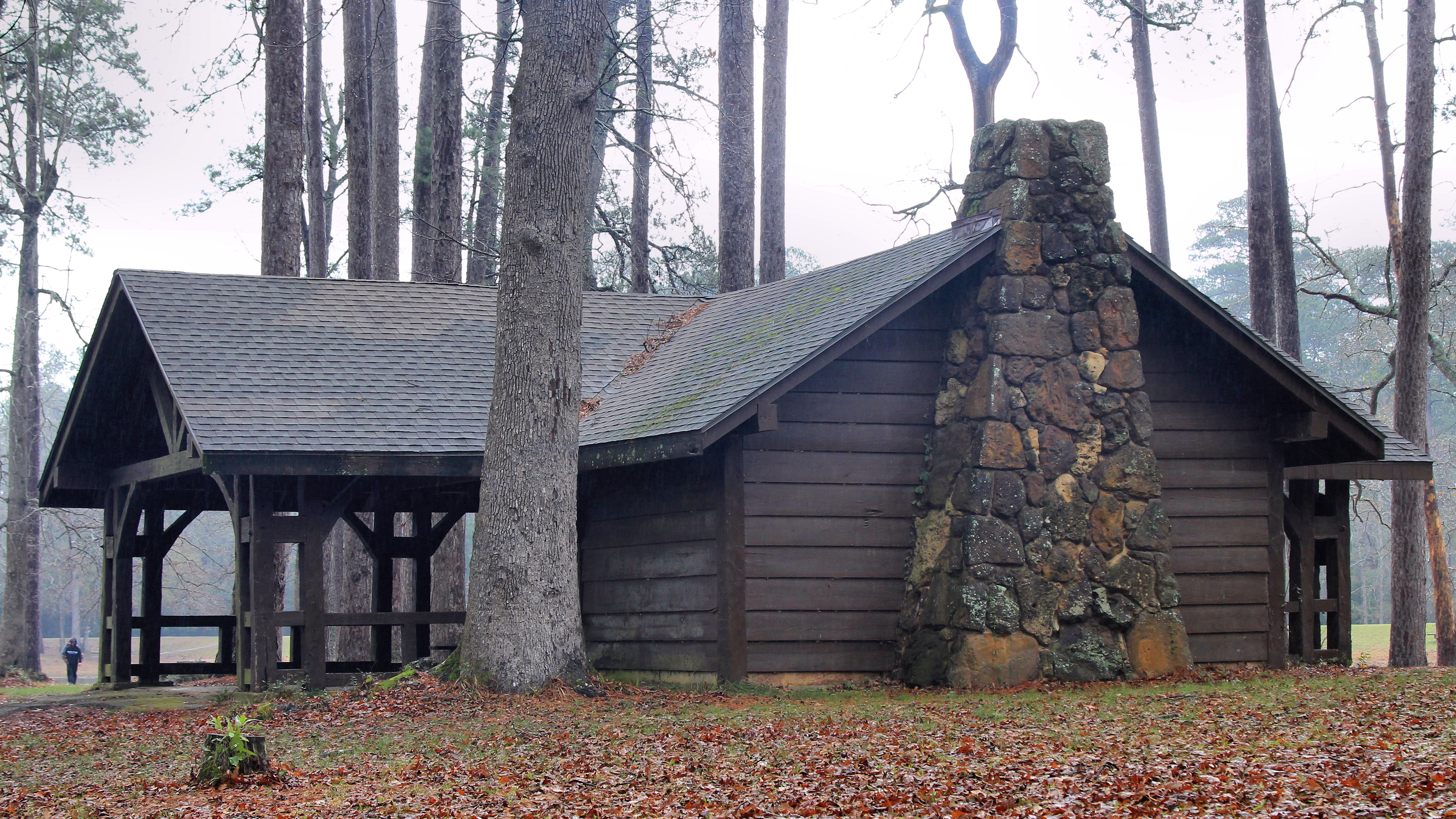
A picnic shelter built by the Civilian Conservation Corps, Double Lake Recreation Area

Double Lake Recreation Area is located on the east side of the Sam Houston near Coldspring, Texas, surrounding a 24-acre (97,000 m^{2}) lake and includes pine trees and hardwoods one mile (1.6 km) south on FM-2025. Built initially in 1937 by the Civilian Conservation Corps, Double Lake Recreation Area facilities includes family camping units, group camping, picnicking units, a picnic shelter, swimming area and beach, and a concession stand with bathhouse. Each family camping unit has a table, fireplace, tent pad, parking spur, and lantern-holder post. There are units with water, sewer, and electrical hook-ups. Picnic units have tables and fireplaces. Canoes and paddleboats can be rented at the concession stand at Double Lake which also has groceries, ice, and other items for sale. Bass, bream, and catfish have been stocked in Double Lake, and fishing is permitted under applicable state laws. Only small electric motors are allowed on the lake. Double Lake Recreation Area also provides access to the Lone Star Hiking Trail.

Stubblefield Recreation Area located on the west side of the Sam Houston National Forest along Lake Conroe where Forest Service Road (FSR) 215 cross the west fork of the San Jacinto River. Located on the north shore of Lake Conroe, Stubblefield has 28 camping units and also provides access to the Lone Star Hiking Trail. Hot showers with restrooms are available for all campers and day-use visitors. Stubblefield is a beautiful forest setting for fishing, hiking, birding, hunting or camping for an enjoyable outdoor experience in the National Forest.

Kelly Pond Recreation Area and Multi-use Trailhead is located west of Interstate 45 approximately eight miles along FM-1375 west of New Waverly. This site offers close locations to the multi-use trails and Lone Star Hiking Trail and has a restroom available. Picnic tables and campsites with lantern post and grills are available. Kelly Pond offers more primitive camping experience and is surrounded by Sam Houston National Forest and all its splendor.

=== Fishing ===
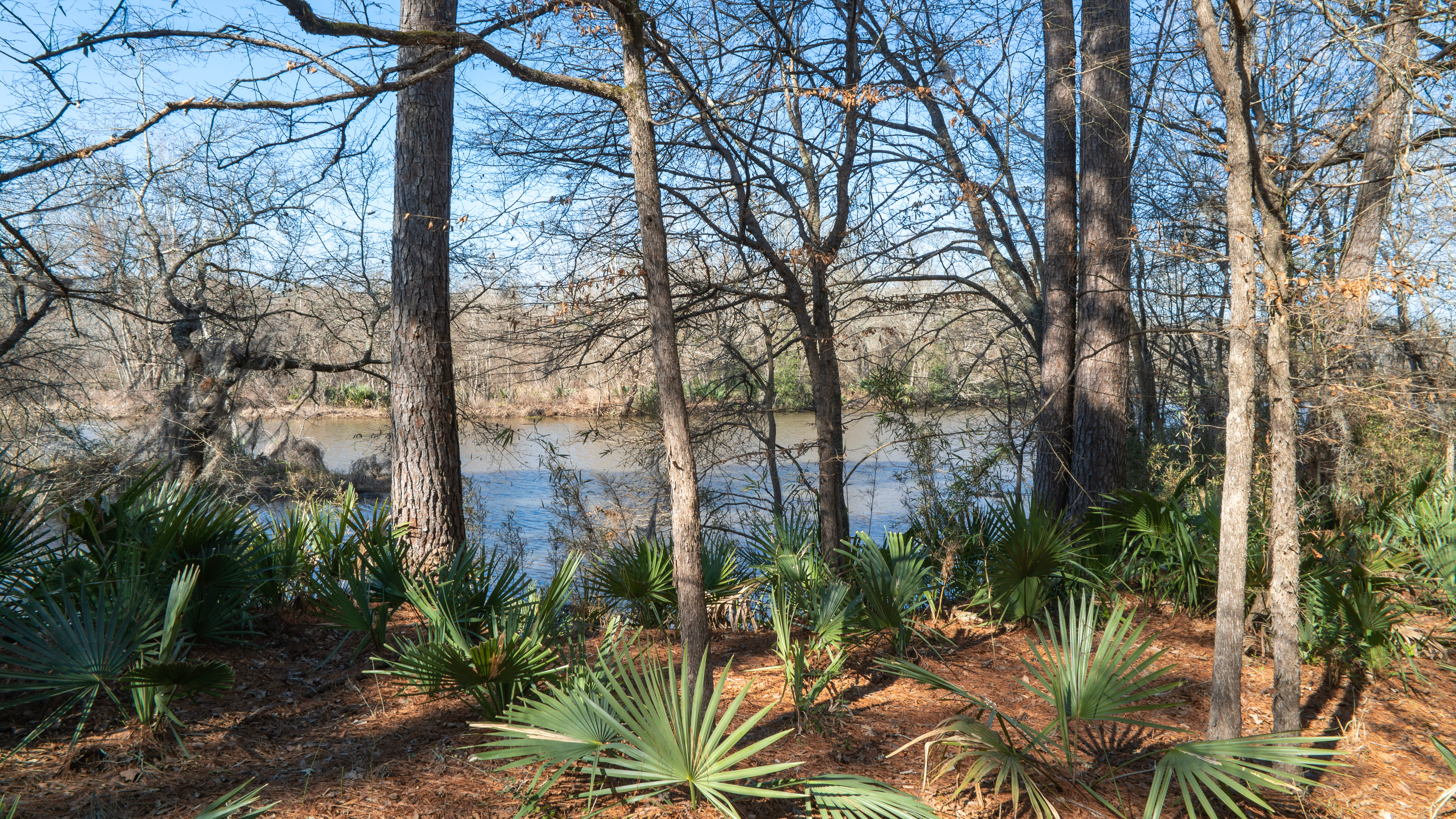
Dwarf palmettos (Sabal minor) growing by Lake Conroe

On the northeast boundary of the forest lies the 82,600 acres (334.3 km^{2}) Lake Livingston. Lake Conroe, to the southwest, offers 22,000 acres (89 km^{2}) of water-oriented recreation. Both lakes are noted for black bass and year-round fishing. The Forest Service provides three access points to Lake Conroe. A boat slip on the San Jacinto River near Stubblefield Recreation Area north on the lake, a boat ramp along the northeastern shore of Lake Conroe at Cagle Recreation Area, and another boat ramp is at Scotts Ridge on the southwestern shore of the lake.

=== Hunting ===
The entire Sam Houston National Forest is designated as a wildlife management area through a cooperative agreement between Texas Parks and Wildlife Department and the U.S. Forest Service. This special designation provides benefits to those who use the Sam Houston National Forest, including hunters, and to the wildlife that live or forage there. Extra fees paid by hunters who use wildlife management areas are collected by Texas Parks and Wildlife Department and are returned to the Forest Service for use in those areas. These funds pay for a variety of programs to improve wildlife habitat and other enhancement programs such as wild turkey restoration, creation of wildlife openings and additional law enforcement. They can also be used to gather and analyze data to improve wildlife habitat. Those who wish to hunt deer or small game in the Sam Houston National Forest must purchase the appropriate wildlife management area hunting permit available where state hunting license are sold. Hunters and those who accompany them must wear hunter orange while hunting with a firearm in the Sam Houston National Forest. Hunters and fishermen are required to have a Texas license and follow State regulations.

=== Boating ===
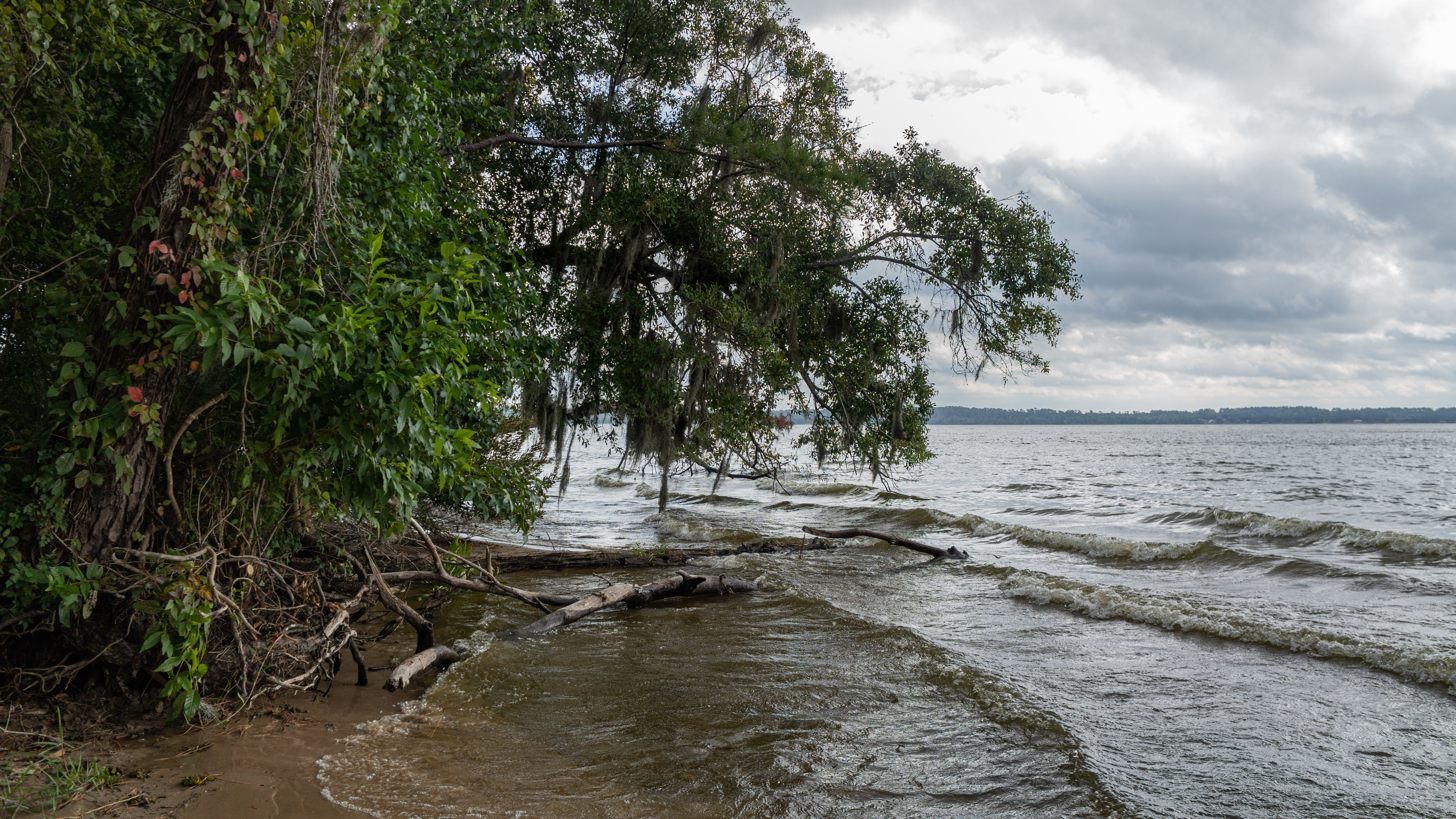
A view of Lake Conroe, Sam Houston National Forest

Both Lake Conroe and Lake Livingston offer fine pleasure boating and water sports. Lake Conroe and the southern section of Lake Livingston offer open water for sailing.

Multi-use trails – Driving off-road vehicles (dirt bikes and small 4-wheelers) and horseback riding are two of the many popular recreational uses of the Sam Houston National Forest. Special trails have been designated and developed for these multiple uses include ORVs, equestrian and mountain bikes.

These trails are loop trails that return to the starting point. Trailheads have been located to give users a logical starting point and a parking area for vehicles. Camping is prohibited on the trail and in parking areas.

ORV use is restricted to the designated multi-use trails. Trail direction is marked with red arrows. Pipelines, powerlines, and other utility rights-of-way are closed to ORV use; however, crossing of these rights-of-way is permitted at designated locations.

ORV enthusiasts are encouraged to seek further information and contact the local district ranger's office at telephone number 888/361-6908 (toll free) concerning operating conditions and areas open to vehicular traffic. These trails are closed after rainfall to protect soils, reduce erosion and protect sensitive fish in the area. Telephone menu messages provide open and closed trails information 24 hours a day.

Operating conditions enforced under the Code of Federal Regulations prohibit the following:

(a) Operating any vehicle, including any off-road vehicle:

1. Without a valid license as required by state law;
2. With an internal or external combustion engine not equipped with a properly installed spark arrestor or exhaust system;
3. Without an operable braking system, or properly installed and working exhaust system;
4. From one-half hour after sunset to one-half hour before sunrise unless equipped with working head and tail lights;
5. In violation of any applicable noise emission standard established by any federal or state agency. If standards overlap, the most stringent will govern.

(b) Driving any vehicle, including off-road vehicles:

1. In excess of posted or established limits on speed, load, weight, length, or width;
2. While under the influence of alcohol or drugs;
3. In violation of state law;
4. In a manner that creates excessive or unusual noise or smoke;
5. Carelessly and without regard for the safety of others;
6. In a manner that endangers, or is likely to endanger, any person or property
7. In a manner creating excessive damage or disturbance of land, wildlife, or vegetation resources.

== Fauna ==
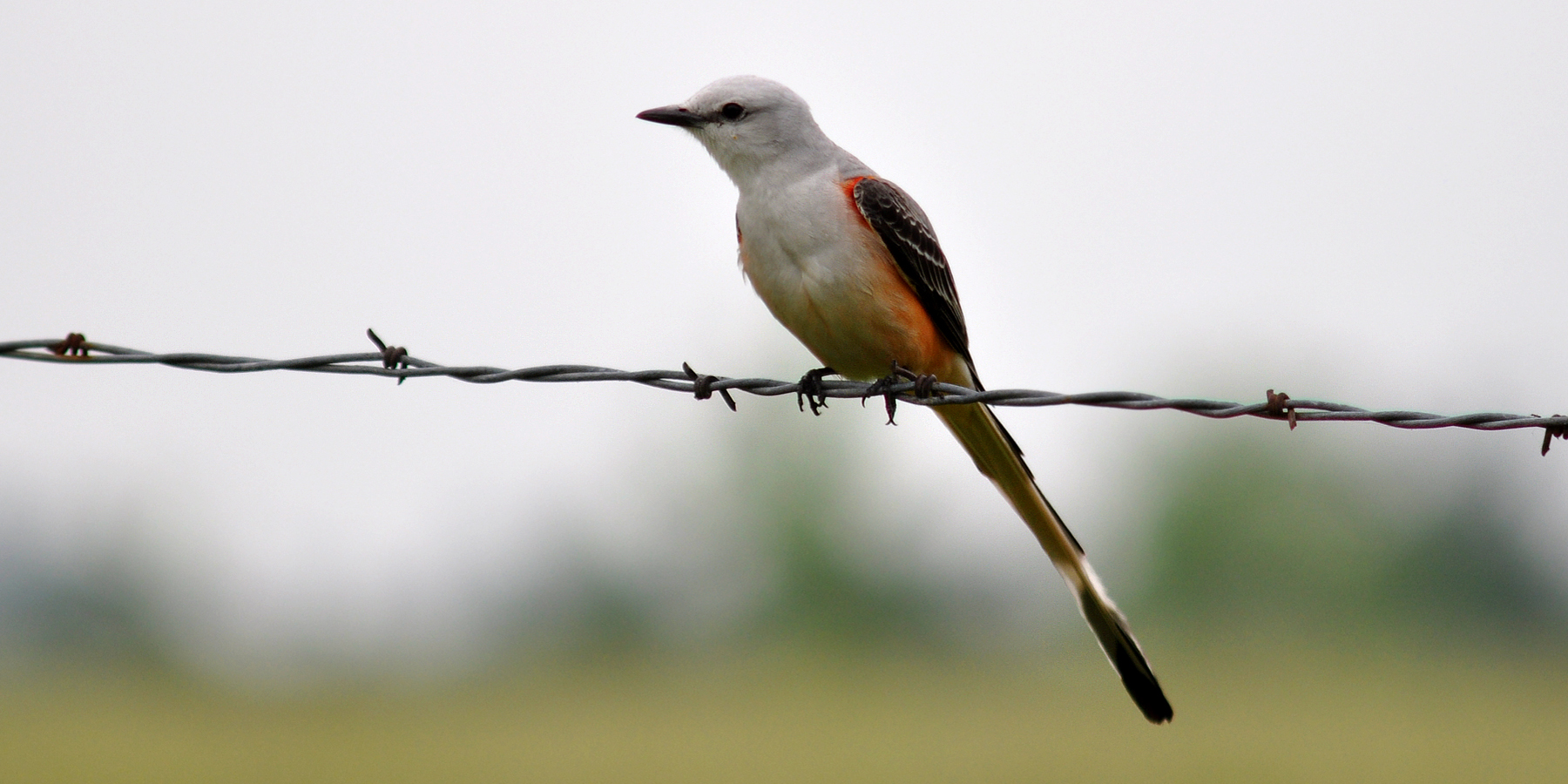
Scissor-tailed Flycatcher (Tyrannus forficatus) Walker Co. Texas, USA

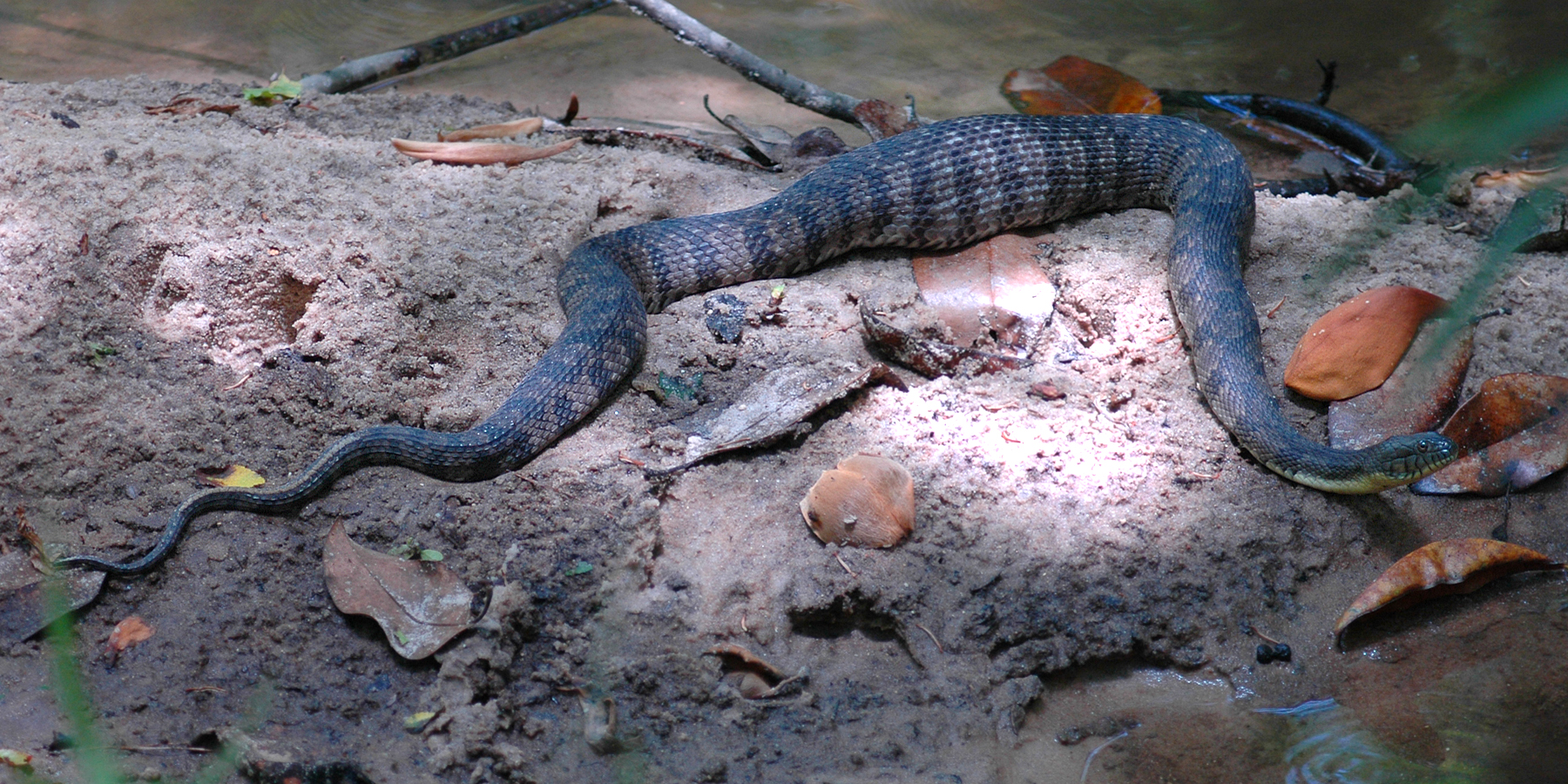
Diamondback watersnake (Nerodia rhombifer) basking after consuming a large pray item, Big Creek Scenic Area.

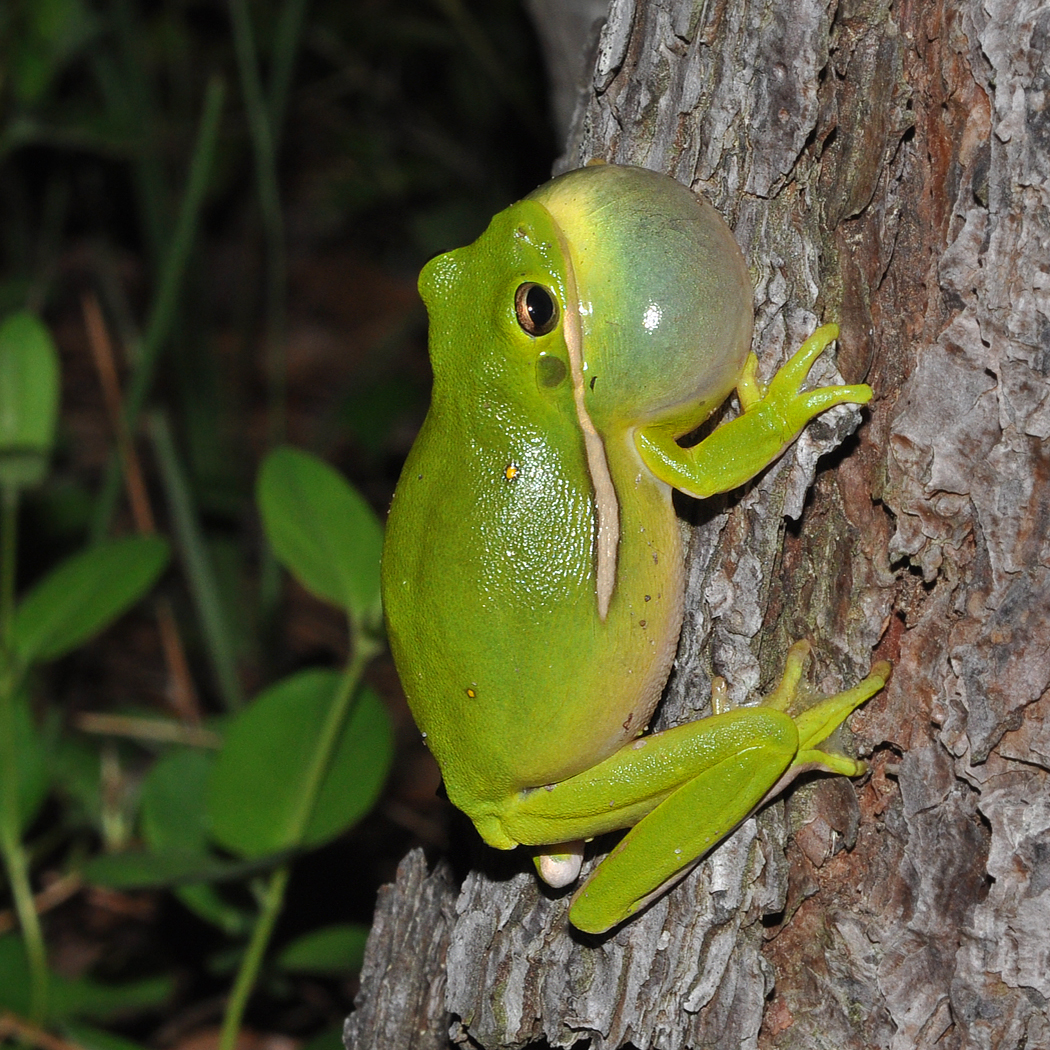
Green treefrog (Hyla cinerea), Montgomery Co. Texas, USA (April 2014)

White-tailed deer (Odocoileus virginianus) is the most popular game animal in the Sam Houston National Forest, with Eastern gray squirrels (Sciurus carolinensis) second. Feral hogs are found in significant populations throughout the forest. They are an introduced species and damage the ecosystem. Quail and dove are found around newly regenerated timberland. For the water sportsman, fishing and duck hunting can be enjoyed on area lakes and streams.

Lake Conroe and the surrounding National Forest lands provide wintering habitat for the bald eagle. During the winter months, the eagle is not an uncommon sight soaring over the lake, perched on a flooded snag or in a tall pine along the shoreline. Other birds found in the forest are pileated woodpeckers, crows, owls and other birds of prey.

The endangered species, red-cockaded woodpecker (Leuconotopicus borealis) is found throughout the Sam Houston National Forest and is occasionally spotted by visitors. The small black and white woodpecker with distinctive large white cheek patches is slightly larger than a bluebird. The male has a single streak of red feathers on each side of his head. Its unique high-pitched, squeaky call can be recognized at considerable distances. The woodpecker makes its home by pecking cavities in large, living pine trees. These cavities are later used by a variety of forest wildlife including other woodpeckers, bluebirds, screech owls, wood ducks, squirrels, and honey bees. The red-cockaded woodpecker also chips pitch wells around the entrances to their cavity nests. The resulting pitch flow gives the cavity tree a distinctive waxy appearance below the nest opening and serves to protect the bird from predatory snakes. The red-cockaded woodpecker was designated an endangered species in 1970. This unique little bird and its habitat are fully protected on the Sam Houston National Forest. Wherever these birds are found, the management emphasis is directed toward providing the special habitat they require.

Reptile diversity is relatively high in southeast Texas. Just a few of the lizards and turtles known from Montgomery, San Jacinto, and Walker counties include broad-headed skink (Plestiodon laticeps), ground skink (Scincella lateralis), green anole (Anolis carolinensis), six-lined racerunner (Aspidoscelis sexlineatus), alligator snapping turtle (Macrochelys temminckii), eastern musk turtle (Sternotherus odoratus), Mississippi map turtle (Graptemys pseudogeographica), red-eared slider (Trachemys scripta), ornate box turtle (Terrapene ornata), and smooth softshell turtle (Apalone mutica). Although not particularly abundant in the forest, American alligator (Alligator mississippiensis) may be present in any lake, river, bayou or large body of permanent water in east Texas.

Five species of venomous snakes occur throughout the forest of southeast Texas: Texas coralsnake (Micrurus tener), eastern copperhead (Agkistrodon contortrix), northern cottonmouth (Agkistrodon piscivorus), and less commonly timber rattlesnake (Crotalus horridus), and western pygmy rattlesnake (Sistrurus miliarius). A few of the many harmless species include buttermilk racer (Coluber constrictor anthicus), western mud snake (Farancia abacura), Louisiana milksnake (Lampropeltis amaura), eastern coachwhip (Masticophis flagellum), western ratsnake (Pantherophis obsoletus), flat-headed snake (Tantilla gracilis), and western ribbonsnake (Thamnophis proximus).

Amphibians known to occur in the counties include American bullfrog (Lithobates catesbeianus), squirrel treefrog (Hyla squirella), Blanchard’s cricket frog (Acris blanchardi), and Strecker’s chorus frog (Pseudacris streckeri). A few of the salamander species include small-mouthed salamander (Ambystoma texanum), central newt (Notophthalmus viridescens), and western lesser siren (Siren nettingi).

The fish of Sam Houston National Forest are largely associated with the San Jacinto River drainage. Species known from the drainage include longnose gar (Lepisosteus osseus), bowfin (Amia calva), American eel (Anguilla rostrata), yellow bullhead (Ameiurus natalis), channel catfish (Ictalurus punctatus), freckled madtom (Noturus nocturnus), largemouth bass (Micropterus salmoides), bluegill (Lepomis macrochirus), redear sunfish (Lepomis microlophus), redspotted sunfish (Lepomis miniatus), and black crappie (Pomoxis nigromaculatus). Some of the small species present are creek chubsucker (Erimyzon oblongus), blackspot shiner (Notropis atrocaudalis), pugnose minnow (Opsopoeodus emiliae), brook silverside (Labidesthes sicculus), sailfin molly (Poecilia latipinna), slough darter (Etheostoma gracile), and dusky darter (Percina sciera).

== Timber ==
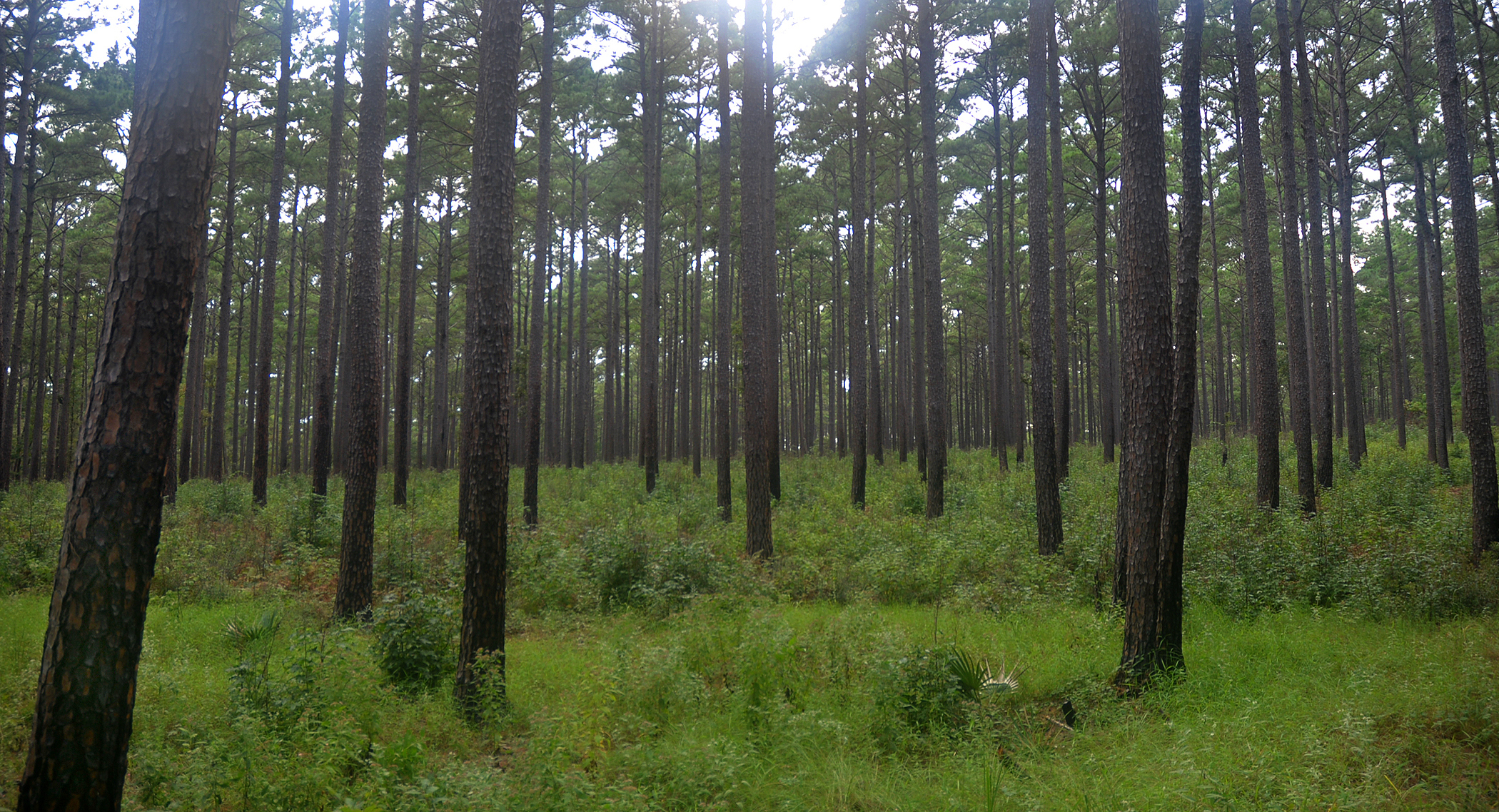
Longleaf pine (Pinus palustris), Sam Houston National Forest

In 1934, when the Texas Legislature extended an invitation to the federal government to purchase land to establish the National Forests in Texas, little of the acquired land was well-stocked with trees plus most of the lands was cut over by private loggers or damaged by fire.

Early U.S. Forest Service management efforts were directed toward protection from fire, planting cut over areas, and improving the tree density in existing young timber stands.

Timber in the Sam Houston National Forest is managed on a sustained yield principle, so the forest will continuously produce timber products in the future for local and national needs. When the timber is removed, the money from sales is sent to the U.S. Treasury, and a portion of these funds is returned to the counties for schools and roads.

== Fire management ==
Wildfire - The U.S. Forest Service and the Texas Forest Service have a cooperative agreement and action plan to coordinate the prevention, law enforcement, aerial detection, and suppression of wildfire.

Prescribed fire - Fire has a proven ecological role in the development and management of the forest and rangelands and is used as a tool for ecosystem management of the Sam Houston National Forest. Prescribed fire can reduce heavy accumulations of forest fuels to minimize damages in the event of wildfires. After an area is prescribed burned, threatened and endangered habitat is improved significantly and new understory sprouts supply food for wildlife.

Weather, fuel conditions, seasonal timing and fire application techniques are all considered by trained professionals while accomplishing these projects.

== Water, soil, and minerals ==
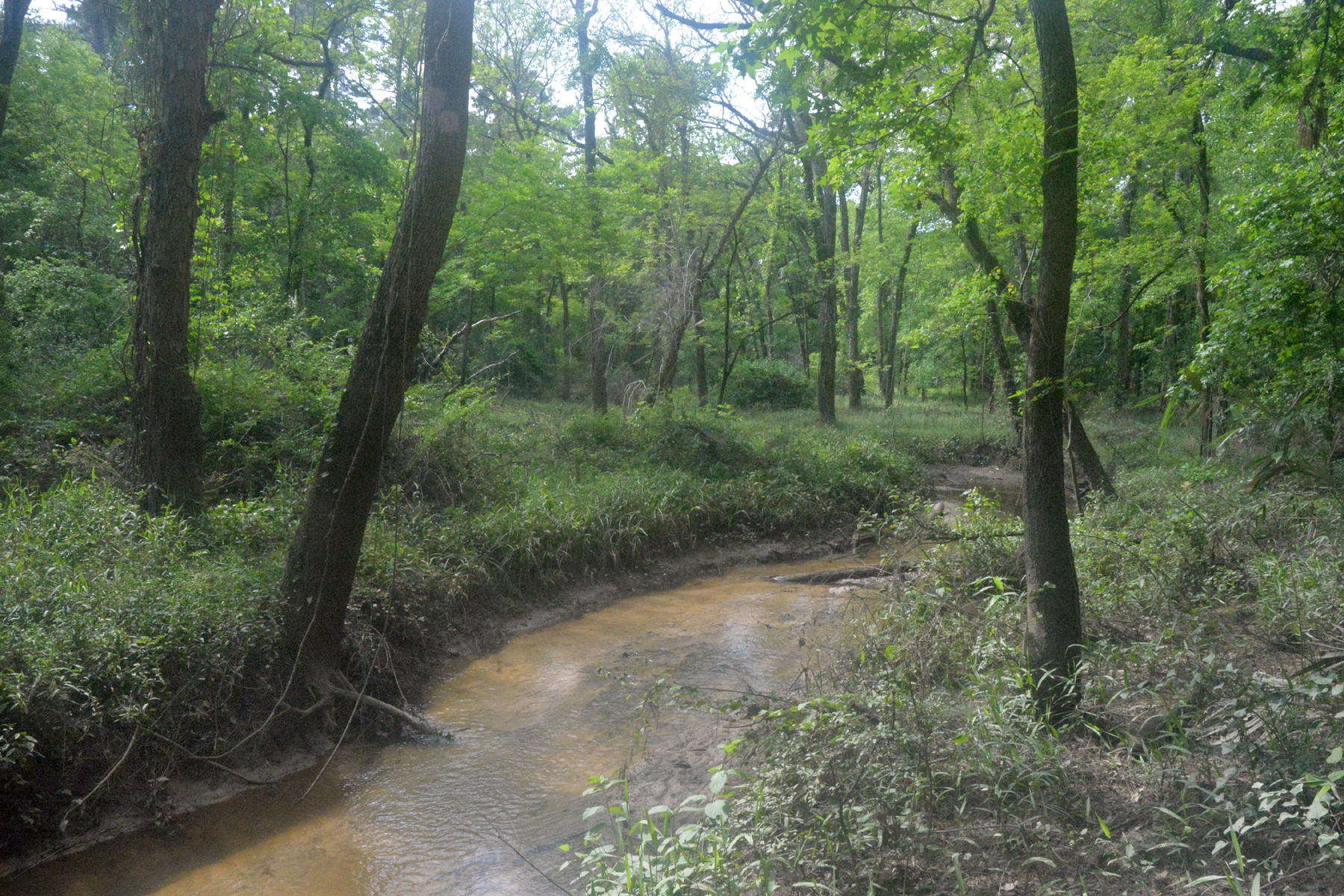
Clear Creek seen from the Lone Star Hiking Trail, Sam Houston National Forest.

The Sam Houston National Forest is drained through several small creeks into the east and west forks of the San Jacinto River, and a small portion drains into Lake Livingston.

Lake Conroe, on the west fork of the San Jacinto River was dammed in 1972. It is in the southwestern part of the Sam Houston National Forest near Conroe, Texas. Lake Livingston on the Trinity River was dammed in 1968 and is located on the Northeastern side of the Sam Houston National Forest near Coldspring, Texas.

The Sam Houston National Forest lies within the Gulf Coastal Plains, and the principal soils were developed from unconsolidated beds of clay, sand, sandy clay, or clay shale materials comprising old non-calcareous sediments of the Tertiary and Pleistocene Ages. The soils range from slightly to severely erosive, although any of the soils in the forest will erode if the right conditions such as heavy rains or where concentrations of waterflow are present.

Exploration and drilling for minerals in the Sam Houston National Forest is part of the multiple-use program. Mineral extraction and drilling, allowed under certain conditions, help meet energy needs. Many of the forest minerals belong to private entities who reserved the mineral rights when the lands were purchased during the 1930s, and under the terms of the deed, these outstanding and reserved minerals can be legally explored and removed by the owner.

Where mineral rights are owned by the government, receipts from mineral leases and royalties are paid to the U.S. Treasury and a portion of these receipts are returned to the counties for schools and roads.

== Other facilities ==
The Gulf Coast Trades Center is located in the forest.

Karolyi Ranch was located within the forest until its shutdown in 2018.

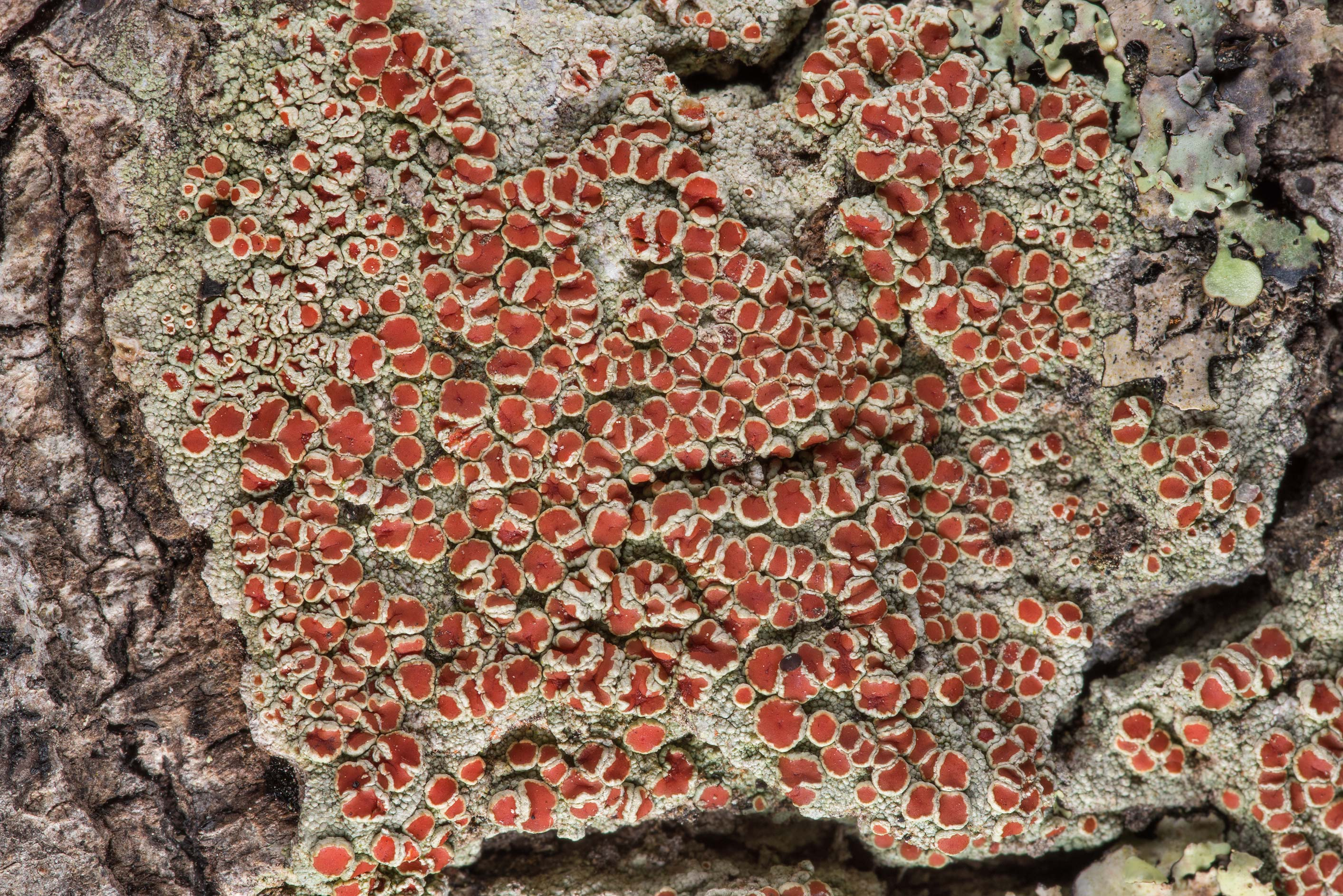
Bloodspot lichen (Haematomma persoonii)

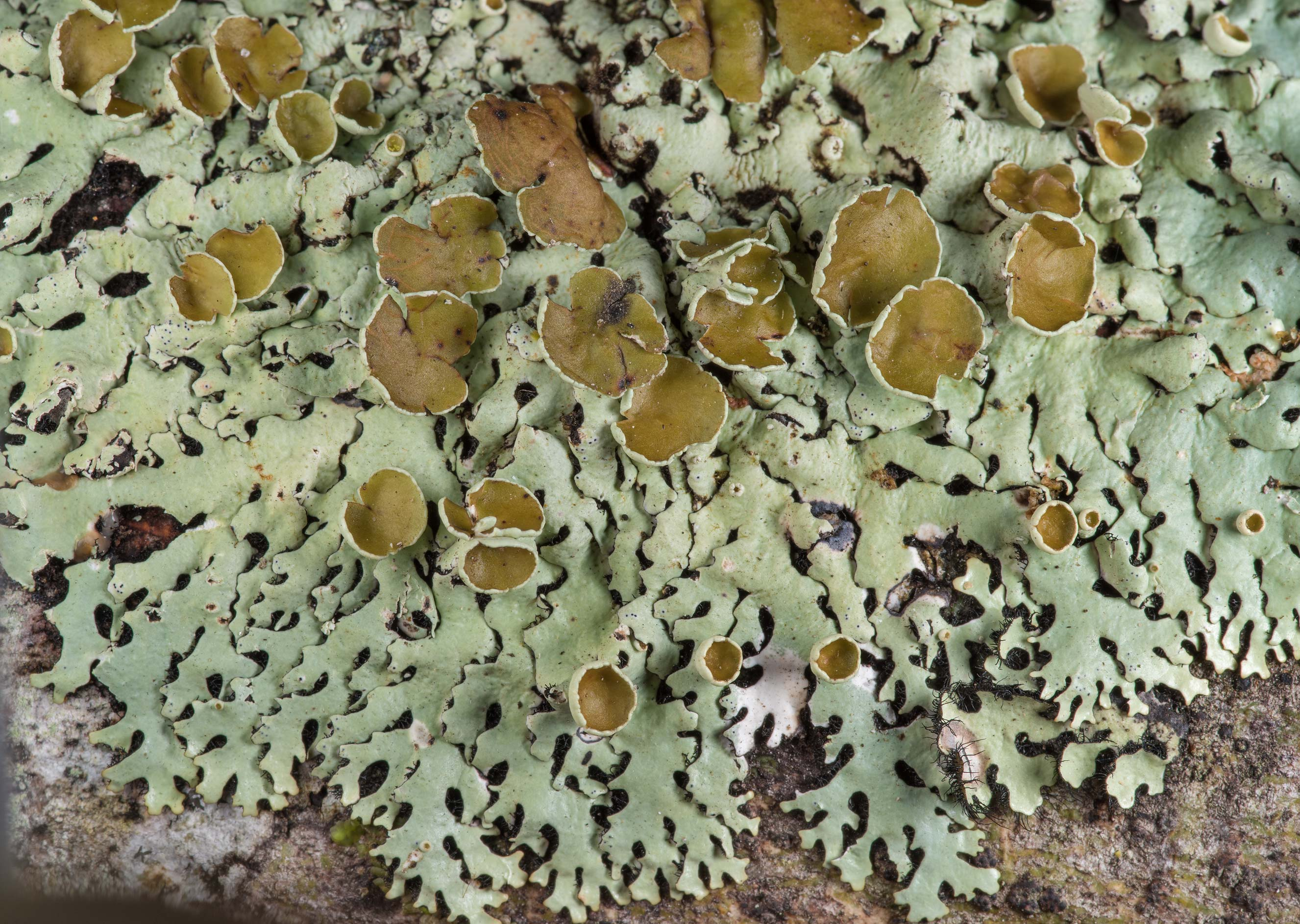
Wrinkled loop lichen (Hypotrachyna livida)

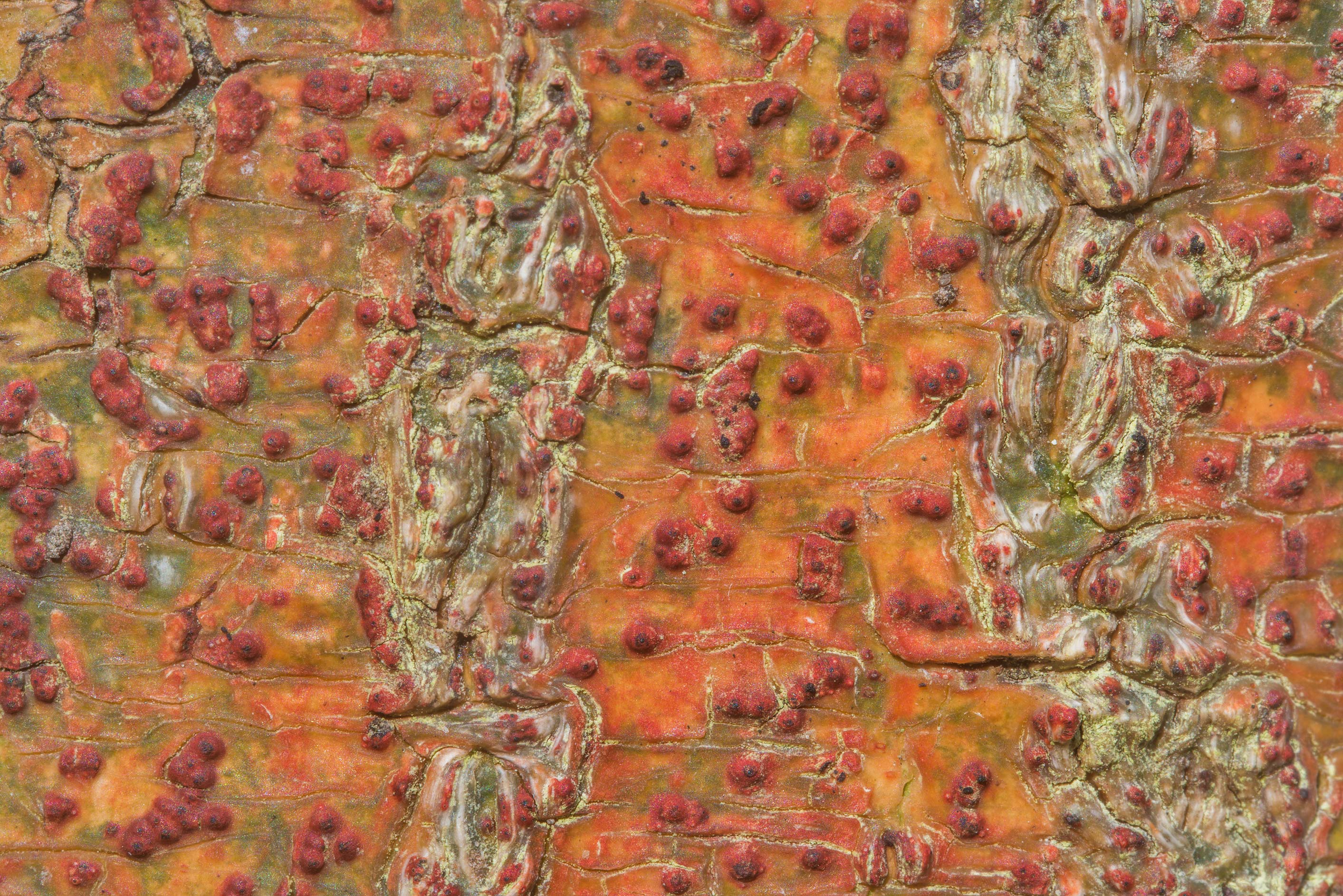
Bark lichen (Pyrenula cruentata)

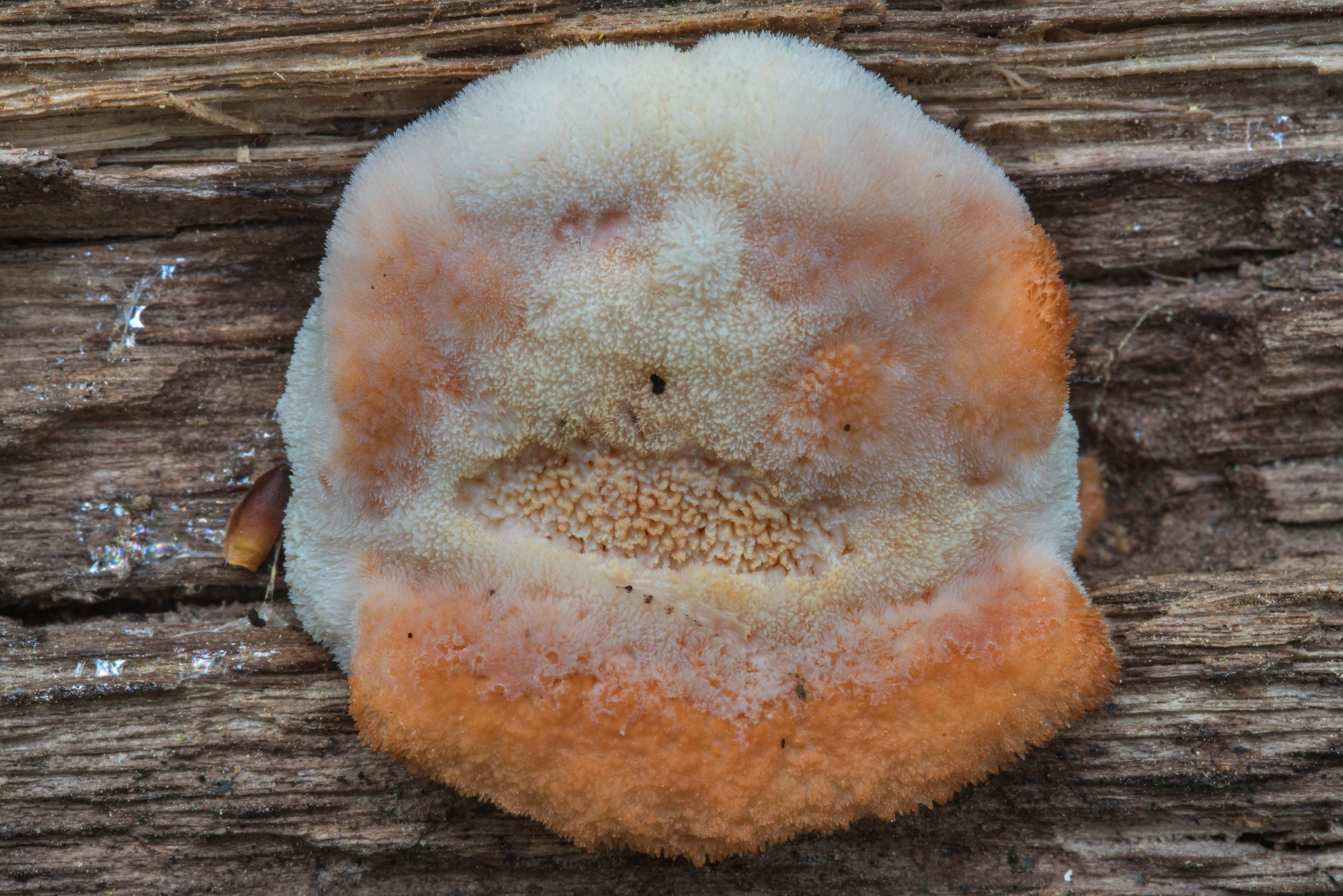
Tooth fungus (Climacodon pulcherrimus)

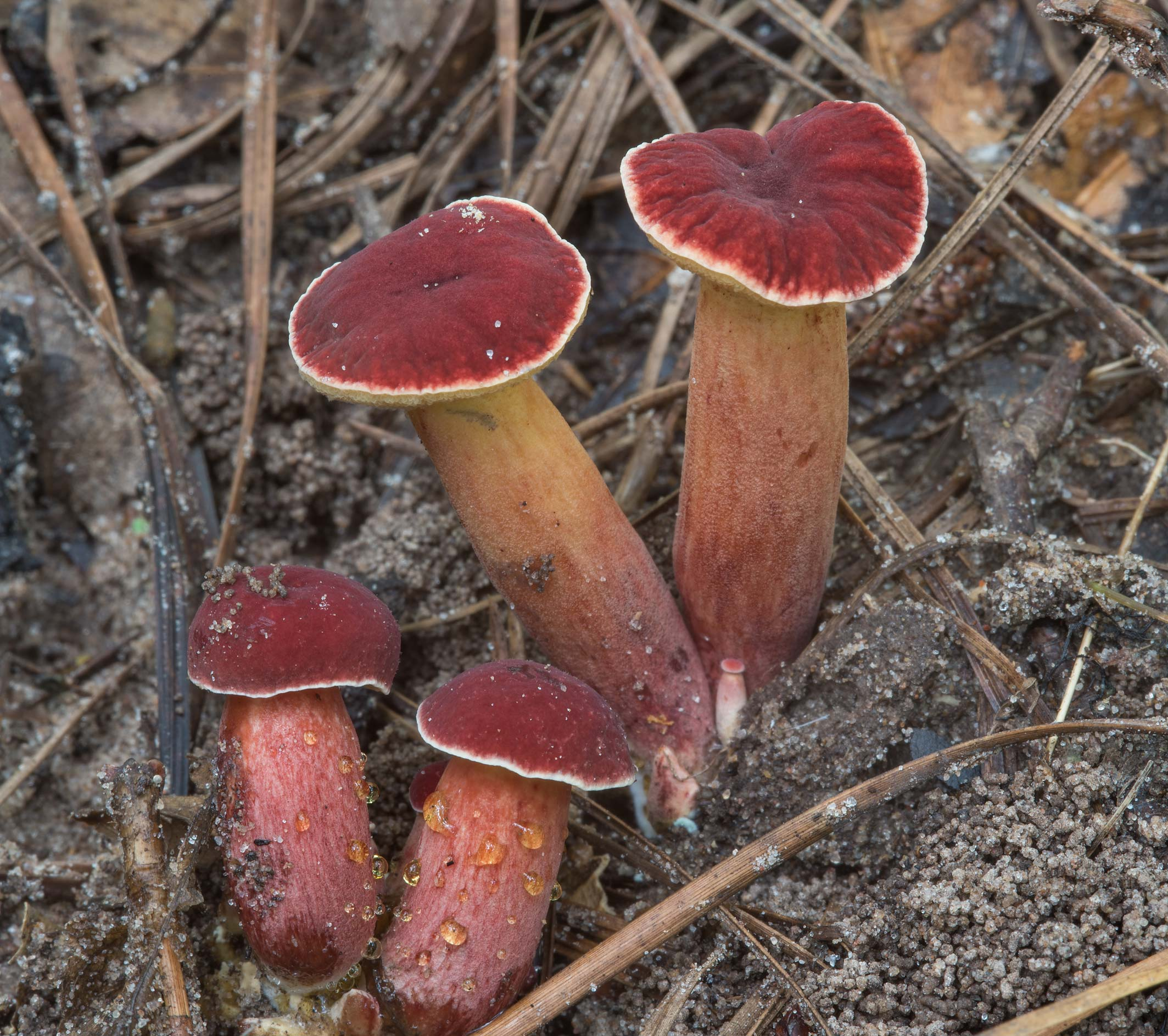
Ruby bolete (Hortiboletus rubellus)

== See also ==
- Texas Forest Trail
- List of national forests of the United States
