= Panorama Village, Texas =

- City
- Location of Panorama Village, Texas
- Coordinates: 30°22′43″N 95°29′47″W
- Country: United States
- State: Texas
- County: Montgomery
- Incorporated: 1972

Government
  - Type: Type A General Law Municipality
  - Mayor: Lynn Scott
  - Council Members: Royce Engler; Clint Fowler; Ted Nichols (Mayor Pro-Tem); Joe Watson; Doug McEntire

Area
  - Total: 1.09 sq mi (2.83 km^{2})
  - Land: 1.08 sq mi (2.79 km^{2})
  - Water: 0.015 sq mi (0.04 km^{2})
- Elevation: 305 ft (93 m)

Population (2020)
  - Total: 2,515
  - Density: 2,252.8/sq mi (869.82/km^{2})
- Time zone: UTC-6 (Central (CST))
  - Summer (DST): UTC-5 (CDT)
- ZIP code: 77304
- Area code: 936
- FIPS code: 48-55008
- GNIS feature ID: 1388607
- Website: www.panoramavillagetx.gov

Panorama Village is a city in Montgomery County, Texas, United States.

Residents have Conroe addresses and Willis phone exchanges. The small city is home to a 27-hole municipal golf course and country club. The population was 2,515 at the 2020 census.

== Geography ==
Panorama Village is located at 30°22′43″N 95°29′47″W (30.378484, –95.496284).

According to the United States Census Bureau, the city has a total area of 1.1 square miles (2.8 km^{2}), of which 1.1 square miles (2.8 km^{2}) is land and 0.90% is water.

== History ==
The Bamwood Development Company purchased the land which would become Panorama Village in 1964. The company constructed a golf course with residential subdivisions surrounding it. A civic association was formed in 1969, with residents purchasing the Panorama Golf Club. The city incorporated in 1972.

== Demographics ==
Historical population
Census	Pop.	Note	%±
1980	1,186		—
1990	1,556		31.2%
2000	1,965		26.3%
2010	2,170		10.4%
2020	2,515		15.9%
U.S. Decennial Census

=== 2020 census ===
As of the 2020 census, Panorama Village had a population of 2,515 and 791 families residing in the city. The median age was 52.5 years. 17.5% of residents were under the age of 18 and 34.0% of residents were 65 years of age or older. For every 100 females there were 83.8 males, and for every 100 females age 18 and over there were 81.6 males age 18 and over.

100.0% of residents lived in urban areas, while 0.0% lived in rural areas.

There were 1,099 households in Panorama Village, of which 21.6% had children under the age of 18 living in them. Of all households, 56.8% were married-couple households, 12.3% were households with a male householder and no spouse or partner present, and 27.8% were households with a female householder and no spouse or partner present. About 28.0% of all households were made up of individuals and 17.9% had someone living alone who was 65 years of age or older.

There were 1,173 housing units, of which 6.3% were vacant. The homeowner vacancy rate was 2.8% and the rental vacancy rate was 13.1%.

Racial composition as of the 2020 census
Race	Number	Percent
White	2,143	85.2%
Black or African American	65	2.6%
American Indian and Alaska Native	2	0.1%
Asian	16	0.6%
Native Hawaiian and Other Pacific Islander	2	0.1%
Some other race	66	2.6%
Two or more races	221	8.8%
Hispanic or Latino (of any race)	242	9.6%

=== 2010 census ===
As of the 2010 United States census, there were 2,170 people, 1,001 households, and 691 families residing in the city. The racial makeup of the city was 96.4% White, 1.1% African American, 0.2% Native American, 0.6% Asian, 0.6% from other races, and 1.1% from two or more races. Hispanic or Latino of any race were 5.6% of the population.

There were 1,001 households, out of which 16.2% had children under the age of 18 living with them, 57.7% were married couples living together, 8.3% had a female householder with no husband present, and 31.0% were non-families. 27.8% of all households were made up of individuals. The average household size was 2.17 and the average family size was 2.60.

In the city, the population was spread out, with 14.8% under the age of 18, 4.9% from 18 to 24, 15.5% from 25 to 44, 33.3% from 45 to 64, and 31.4% who were 65 years of age or older. The median age was 55.6 years. For every 100 females, there were 84.4 males. For every 100 females age 18 and over, there were 81.4 males.

=== 2015 American Community Survey ===
According to the 2015 American Community Survey, The median income for a household in the city was $61,250 and the median income for a family was $67,137. Males had a median income of $47,708 versus $26,935 for females. The per capita income for the city was $38,199. About 4.6% of families and 6.4% of the population were below the poverty line, including 6.4% of those under age 18 and 3.8% of those age 65 or over.

== Government ==
Panorama Village is governed locally by a mayor and five member city council. The current mayor is Lynn Scott. Ted Nichols, a council member, also serves as mayor pro tempore. The other council members are Royce Engler, Clint Fowler, Joe Watson, and Doug McEntire.

In the Texas State Senate, Panorama Village is part of District 4, represented by Republican Brandon Creighton. In the Texas House of Representatives, Panorama Village is part of District 16, represented by Republican Will Metcalf.

In the United States Senate, Republicans John Cornyn and Ted Cruz represent the entire state of Texas. In the United States House of Representatives, Panorama Village is part of District 8, represented by Republican Kevin Brady.

== Education ==
Panorama Village is within the Willis Independent School District.

Panorama Village zoned to Turner Elementary School, Brabham Middle School, and Willis High School.

Residents of Willis ISD (and therefore Panorama Village) are served by the Lone Star College System (formerly North Harris Montgomery Community College).
