= Willis, Texas =

- City
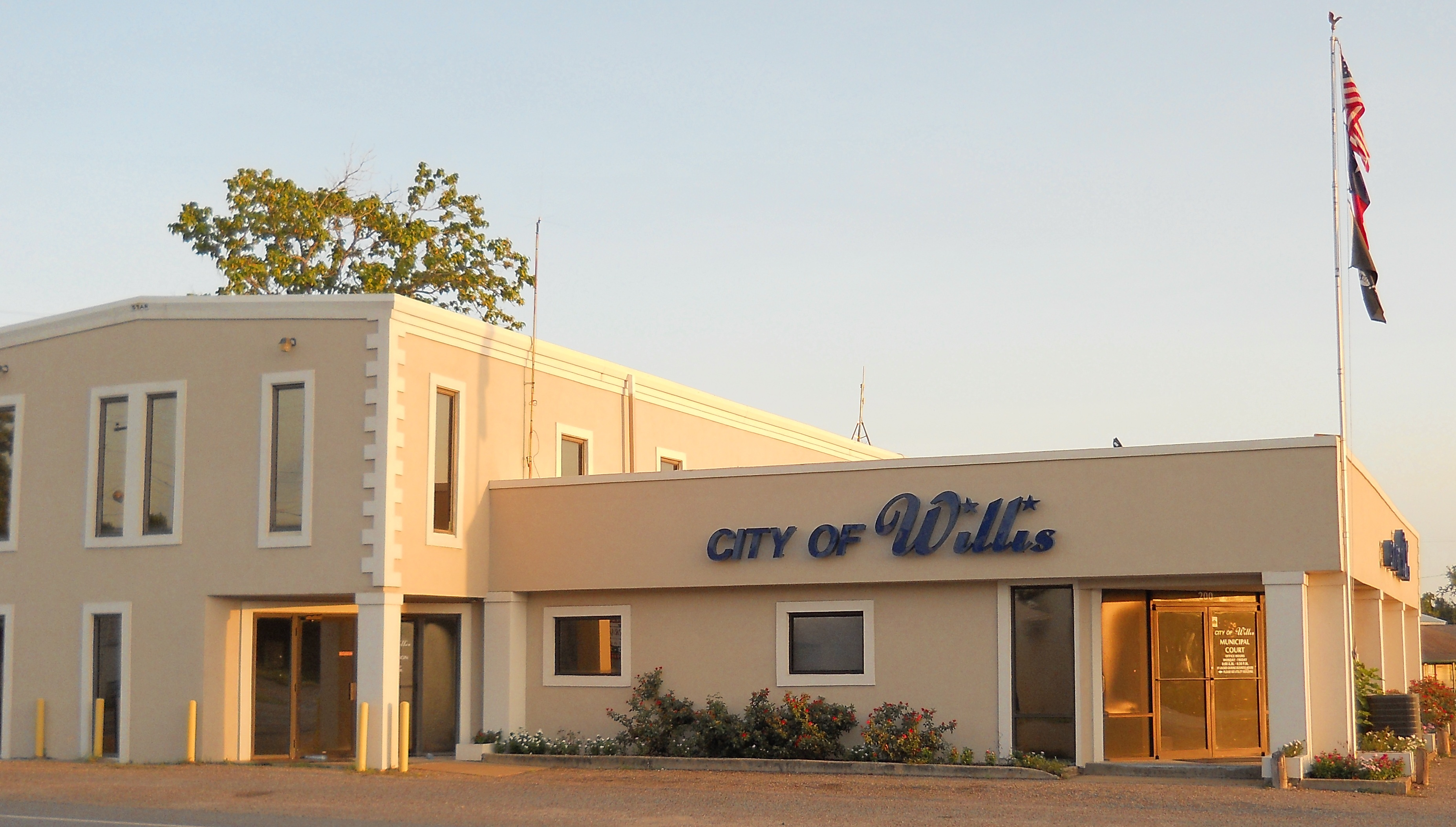
- City Hall of Willis, Texas

- Location of Willis, Texas
- Coordinates: 30°25′26″N 95°28′47″W
- Country: United States
- State: Texas
- County: Montgomery
- Founded: 1870
- Incorporated: 1937
- Home Rule: 2008

Government
  - Type: Council–Manager
  - Mayor: William Brown
  - City manager: Sheyi I. Ipaye
  - Councilmembers: Ashley Nixon; Barney Stone; Thomas Belinoski; Thomas Luster; Kaye Maglitto

Area
  - Total: 4.735 sq mi (12.264 km^{2})
  - Land: 4.732 sq mi (12.257 km^{2})
  - Water: 0.0023 sq mi (0.006 km^{2}) 0.04%
- Elevation: 384 ft (117 m)

Population (2020)
  - Total: 6,431
  - Estimate (2023): 6,964
  - Density: 1,471.6/sq mi (568.19/km^{2})
- Time zone: UTC–6 (Central (CST))
  - Summer (DST): UTC–5 (CDT)
- ZIP Codes: 77318, 77378
- Area code: 936
- FIPS code: 48-79408
- GNIS feature ID: 1371602
- Sales tax: 8.25%
- Website: ci.willis.tx.us

Willis is a city in Montgomery County, Texas, United States, located eight miles north of Conroe in north central Montgomery County. The city began to develop in 1870 after what is now the Union Pacific Railroad built track through the area. As a part of the Piney Woods, the Willis economy has historically been driven by lumber, agriculture, and the manufacture of lumber and agriculture equipment. From the late nineteenth to early twentieth century, it produced tobacco as a commodity crop. Competition from Cuba reduced its contribution to the economy.

The population was 6,431 at the 2020 census, and was estimated to be 6,964 in 2023. In 2008, after Willis's population passed 5,000, the city established a home rule city charter.

== Geography ==
According to the United States Census Bureau, the city has a total area of 4.735 square miles (12.26 km^{2}), of which 4.733 square miles (12.26 km^{2}) is land and 0.002 square miles (0.0052 km^{2}) (0.04%) is water.

== History ==
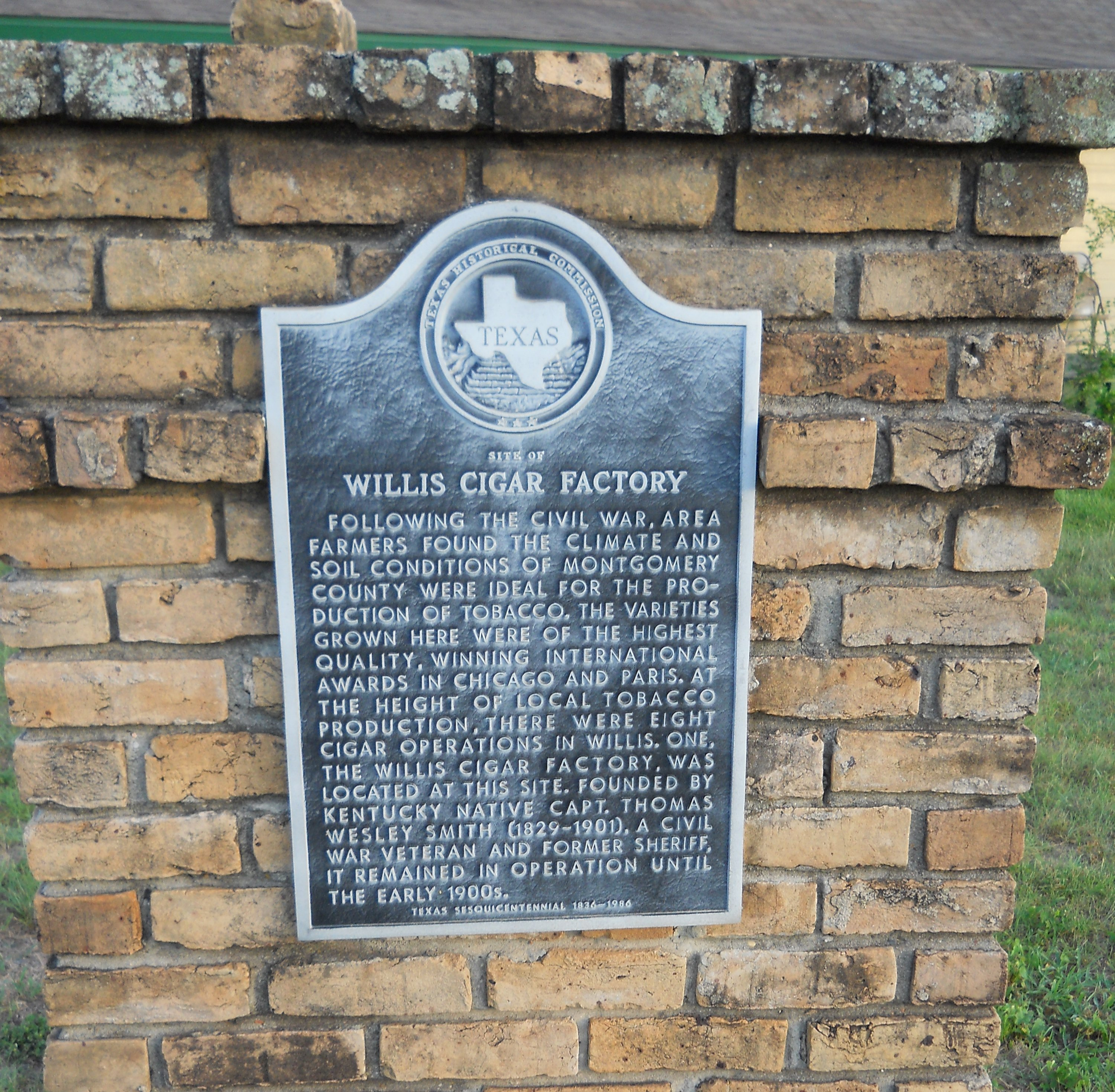
Willis Cigar Factory. Texas Historic Marker, N. Bell St., Willis, TX

Before the founding of Willis, most residents in the area lived in a settlement known as Danville, formed in the 1830s four miles west of present-day New Waverly. A few Danville residents in the 1850s settled to the south, founding the new community of what is now Willis.

Several of these early Danville residents were large planters, who enslaved numerous African Americans to work the labor-intensive tobacco crops on their plantations. In the 1850s, enslaved African Americans outnumbered whites in Danville: there were 600 slaves and 400 whites. After the Civil War, many freedmen and their families moved away from the plantations to the Willis area. There in 1867 they established Thomas Chapel United Methodist Church, which is the oldest church in Willis.

In 1870, the Houston and Great Northern Railroad (now the Union Pacific Railroad) decided to build a railroad through Montgomery County. After residents of Danville refused to allow the railway through their town, Peter J. and Richard S. Willis donated a parcel of their landholdings in Montgomery County so the railroad and station stop could be built there. They founded the town of Willis in the process. Upon the railroad's completion in 1872, many residents of Danville, Old Waverly, and Montgomery moved to the new town of Willis.

In 1874, a county election was held to determine whether the county seat of Montgomery County should be transferred from the town of Montgomery to Willis. Although Willis received more votes (788 to 646), it did not gain the requisite two-thirds majority, so the county seat remained officially in Montgomery. A protracted legal battle ended in 1878 when the Supreme Court of Texas ruled in favor of Montgomery. With several county officials and Willis residents refusing to accept the results, another county seat election was held in 1880. That year Montgomery won the vote over Willis, 1308 to 1243. The dispute between the two towns finally ended in 1889, when Conroe was selected as the county seat.

In the 1870s, the main occupations were farming, shipping, and the manufacture of lumber and agricultural products. In 1891, local Willis residents started growing Cuban tobacco, and Willis developed as a center for the production of cigars and other tobacco products. During the early years of the Great Depression, Willis suffered from falling demand in lumber products and a sharp decline in the demand for tobacco products. A man named Tom Payne was lynched in Willis in 1927.

The economy began to recover in 1931 during the Texas oil boom, when oil was discovered in the area. In the 1930s and 40s, the development of U.S. Route 75, along with the recovery of the lumber industry during World War II, fully revitalized the local economy.

In the mid to late 20th century through the present, agriculture and lumber remain vital components of the Willis economy, in addition to the retail, service, and manufacturing industries.

== Demographics ==
Historical population
Census	Pop.	Note	%±
1880	656		—
1940	904		—
1950	1,164		28.8%
1960	975		−16.2%
1970	1,577		61.7%
1980	1,674		6.2%
1990	2,764		65.1%
2000	3,985		44.2%
2010	5,662		42.1%
2020	6,431		13.6%
2023 (est.)	6,964		8.3%
U.S. Decennial Census; 2020 Census

As of the 2023 American Community Survey, there are 2,788 estimated households in Willis with an average of 2.37 persons per household. The city has a median household income of $53,182. Approximately 12.5% of the city's population lives at or below the poverty line. Willis has an estimated 64.3% employment rate, with 16.9% of the population holding a bachelor's degree or higher and 83.2% holding a high school diploma.

The top five reported ancestries (people were allowed to report up to two ancestries, thus the figures will generally add to more than 100%) were English (75.6%), Spanish (24.4%), Indo-European (0.0%), Asian and Pacific Islander (0.0%), and Other (0.0%).

The median age in the city was 42.3 years.

=== Racial and ethnic composition ===
Willis, Texas – racial and ethnic composition Note: the US Census treats Hispanic/Latino as an ethnic category. This table excludes Latinos from the racial categories and assigns them to a separate category. Hispanics/Latinos may be of any race.
Race / ethnicity (NH = non-Hispanic)	Pop. 2000	Pop. 2010	Pop. 2020	% 2000	% 2010	% 2020
White alone (NH)	1,988	2,381	2,529	49.89%	42.05%	39.33%
Black or African American alone (NH)	831	1,007	1,076	20.85%	17.79%	16.73%
Native American or Alaska Native alone (NH)	21	13	16	0.53%	0.23%	0.25%
Asian alone (NH)	12	21	28	0.30%	0.37%	0.44%
Pacific Islander alone (NH)	0	5	2	0.00%	0.09%	0.03%
Other race alone (NH)	12	2	29	0.30%	0.04%	0.45%
Mixed race or multiracial (NH)	36	81	246	0.90%	1.43%	3.83%
Hispanic or Latino (any race)	1,085	2,152	2,505	27.23%	38.01%	38.95%
Total	3,985	5,662	6,431	100.00%	100.00%	100.00%

=== 2020 census ===
As of the 2020 census, there were 6,431 people, 2,158 households, and 1,608 families residing in the city. The population density was 1,358.8 inhabitants per square mile (524.6/km^{2}). There were 2,346 housing units at an average density of 495.67 per square mile (191.4/km^{2}).

The median age was 31.1 years. 30.3% of residents were under the age of 18 and 10.3% of residents were 65 years of age or older. For every 100 females there were 94.8 males, and for every 100 females age 18 and over there were 87.6 males age 18 and over.

There were 2,158 households in Willis, of which 46.5% had children under the age of 18 living in them. Of all households, 42.2% were married-couple households, 17.3% were households with a male householder and no spouse or partner present, and 33.1% were households with a female householder and no spouse or partner present. About 20.4% of all households were made up of individuals and 8.0% had someone living alone who was 65 years of age or older.

There were 2,346 housing units, of which 8.0% were vacant. The homeowner vacancy rate was 1.8% and the rental vacancy rate was 7.9%.

According to the 2020 census, 98.4% of residents lived in urban areas, while 1.6% lived in rural areas.

Racial composition as of the 2020 census
Race	Number	Percent
White	3,025	47.0%
Black or African American	1,088	16.9%
American Indian and Alaska Native	54	0.8%
Asian	35	0.5%
Native Hawaiian and Other Pacific Islander	3	0.0%
Some other race	1,227	19.1%
Two or more races	999	15.5%
Hispanic or Latino (of any race)	2,505	39.0%

=== 2010 census ===
As of the 2010 census, there were 5,662 people, 1,782 households, and 1,340 families residing in the city. The population density was 1,681.8 inhabitants per square mile (649.3/km^{2}). There were 2,006 housing units at an average density of 595.25 per square mile (229.8/km^{2}). The racial makeup of the city was 56.75% White, 18.17% African American, 0.92% Native American, 0.37% Asian, 0.09% Pacific Islander, 20.12% from some other races and 3.59% from two or more races. Hispanic or Latino people of any race were 38.01% of the population.

There were 1,782 households, out of which 42.5% had children under the age of 18 living with them, 42.5% were married couples living together, 25.0% had a female householder with no husband present, and 24.8% were non-families. 19.6% of all households were made up of individuals. The average household size was 3.10 and the average family size was 3.55.

In the city, the population was spread out, with 33.3% under the age of 18, 11.3% from 18 to 24, 28.4% from 25 to 44, 18.3% from 45 to 64, and 8.1% who were 65 years of age or older. The median age was 29.1 years. For every 100 females, there were 91.4 males. For every 100 females age 18 and over, there were 85.3 males.

The median income for a household in the city was $27,321, and the median income for a family was $32,269. Males had a median income of $_ versus $_ for females. The per capita income for the city was $20,947. About _% of families and _% of the population were below the poverty line, including _% of those under age 18 and _% of those age 65 or over.

== Government ==
=== Local government ===
The city was incorporated in 1937. When Willis was incorporated, it was governed by general law, as defined by the Constitution of Texas. In 2008, when population estimates placed noted total residents exceeded 5000 persons, Willis adopted a Home rule city charter. Home Rule in Texas enables cities to establish their own laws as long as those laws are consistent with the Texas Constitution. It also grants greater freedom for cities to levy taxes and pay off debts. On May 10, 2008, the residents of Willis voted to adopt the City of Willis Home Rule Charter.

The city has a council-manager government. The six-member city council consists of a mayor elected at-large and five city council member elected from single-member districts. As of June 2022, the mayor is Leonard Reed. Council members are Ashley Nixon, Barney Stone, Tamara Young-Hector, Thomas Luster, and William Brown. The council appoints a professional city manager to deal with day to day operations and assert substantial administrative powers. As of June 2022, the city manager is Sheyi Ipaye.

=== State government ===
Willis is part of District 3, Texas Senate, and represented by Republican Robert Nichols. In the Texas House of Representatives, Willis is part of District 16, represented by Republican Will Metcalf.

=== Federal government ===
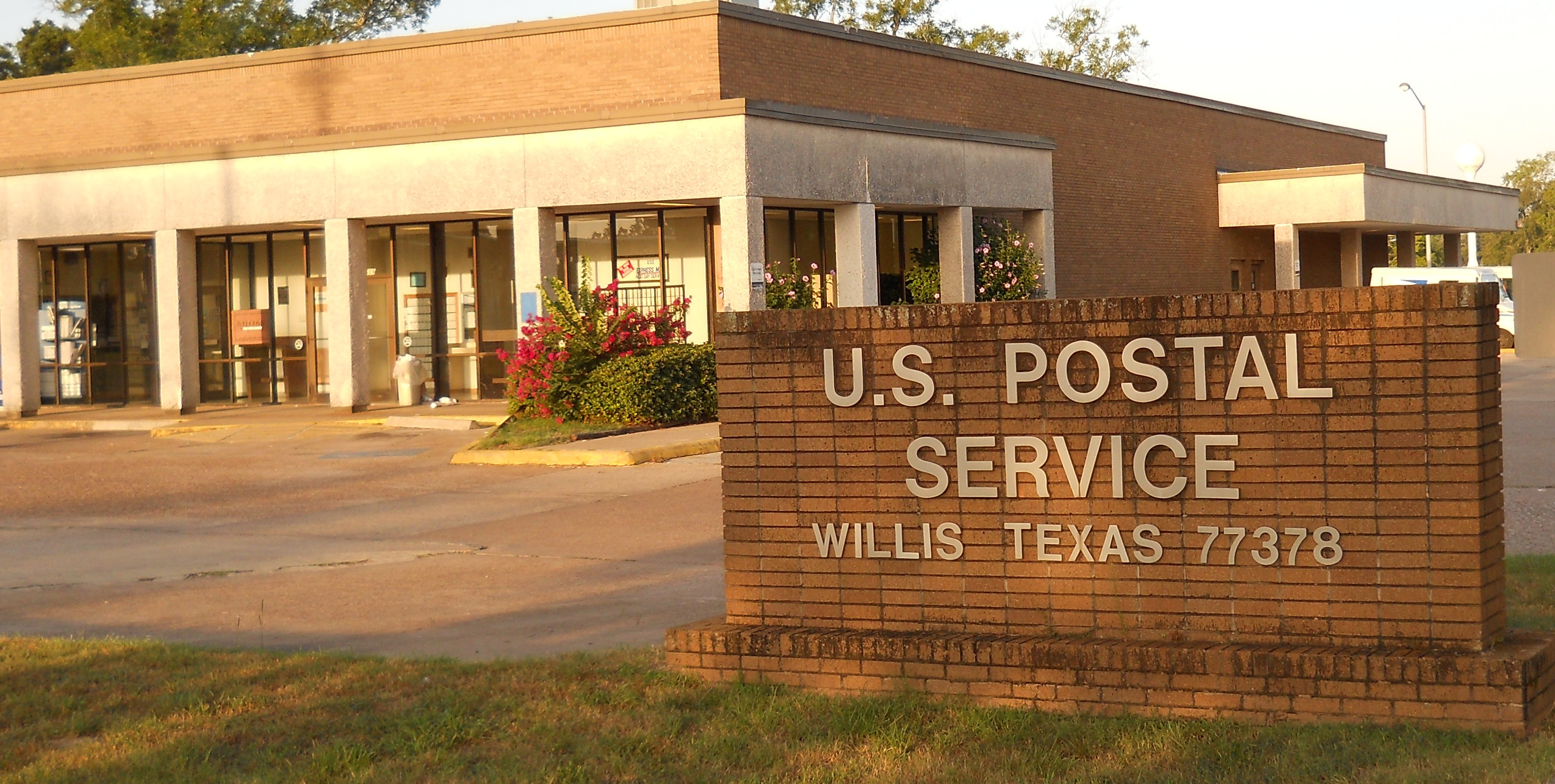
Willis Post Office, Willis, Texas 77378

In the United States Senate, Republicans John Cornyn and Ted Cruz represent the entire state of Texas. In the United States House of Representatives, Willis is part of Texas's 8th congressional district, represented by Republican Morgan Luttrell.

The United States Postal Service Willis Post Office is located at 609 North Campbell Street.

== Infrastructure ==
=== Transportation ===
In the 1960s, Interstate 45 was built through the western portion of Willis, connecting Willis with Houston to the south and Dallas to the north. The previous Houston-Dallas route through Willis, U.S. route 75, is now Texas State Highway 75, running parallel to Interstate 45 through downtown Willis.

Farm to Market Road 1097 connects Willis to Lake Conroe and Montgomery to the west. Its eastern terminus is Texas State Highway 150 to the east of New Waverly.

Union Pacific operates a railroad that travels north-south through Willis.

=== Parks and recreation ===
The central portion of Lake Conroe is located a few miles west of Willis.

Sam Houston National Forest is located several miles west, north, and east of Willis.

== Education ==
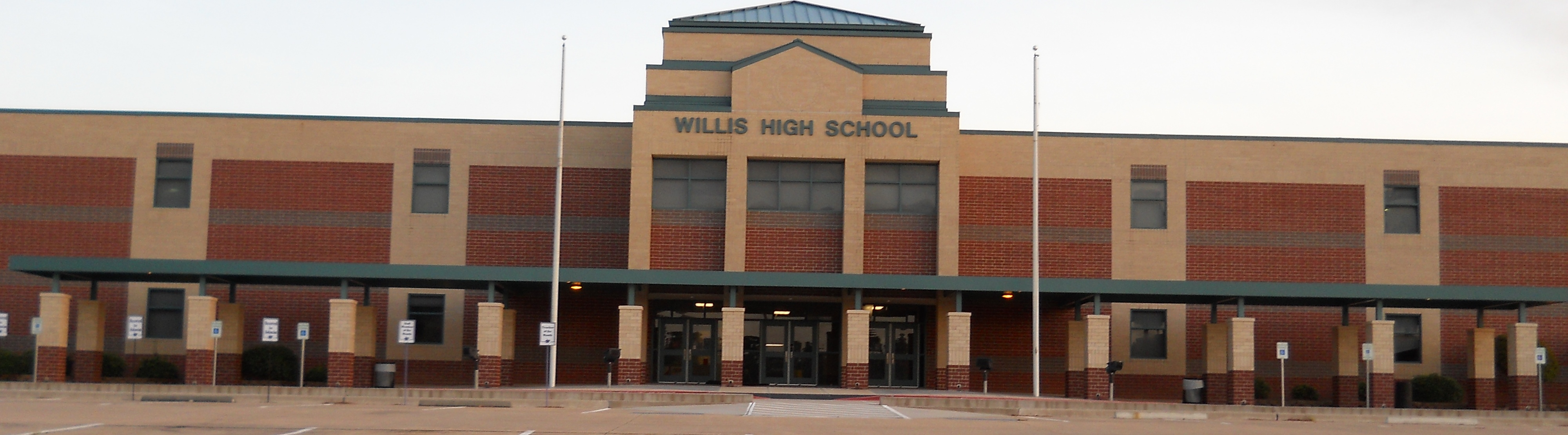
Willis High School

=== Primary and secondary schools ===
==== Public schools ====
The area school district is Willis Independent School District.

Six district elementary schools, all of which are in Willis, serve portions of Willis:

- Edward B. Cannan Elementary School (Grades Pre-K–5th)
- C. C. Hardy Elementary School (Grades Pre-K–5th)
- Mel Parmley Elementary School (Grades Pre-K–5th)
- A.R. Turner Elementary School (Grades Pre-K–5th)
- William Lloyd Meador Elementary School (Grades Pre-K–5th)
- Lagway Elementary School (Grades Pre-K-5th)

Three middle schools serve portions of Willis:

- Robert P. Brabham Middle School (Grades 6–8) (Unincorporated Montgomery County)
- Lynn Lucas Middle School (Grades 6–8) (Willis)
- Calfee Middle School (Grades 6-8) (Conroe)

All of the city is zoned to Willis High School in Conroe.

Portions of the city used to be zoned to Turner Elementary School until the attendance zoned changed for the 2006–2007 school year, rezoning the portion to Hardy Elementary School.

Responsive Education Solutions operates the K-8 charter school Vista Academy of Willis.

==== Area private schools ====
- Covenant Christian School

=== Colleges and universities ===
Lone Star College (originally the North Harris Montgomery Community College District) serves the community. The territory in Willis ISD joined the community college district in 1996. The nearest campus is Lone Star College-Montgomery, which operates the Conroe Center in northern Conroe.

=== Public libraries ===
Montgomery County Memorial Library System operates the R. F. Meador Branch at 709 West Montgomery Street.

== Notable people ==
- Michael Bishop, former professional football player
- DJ Lagway, college football player
- Tina Chandler, IFBB professional bodybuilder
- Jessie Hollins (1970–2009), professional baseball right-handed pitcher
- Marcus Luttrell, Navy SEAL
- D.D. Terry, professional football player
- Cliff Young (1964–1993), professional baseball left-handed pitcher
- Bernard S. Garrett Sr. (September 19, 1925 – September 9, 1999)[1] was an American businessman, investor and banker.[2]
