= San Jacinto River Authority =

Watershed management in the southeast of Texas, USA

The San Jacinto River Authority manages the San Jacinto River and its contributing watershed, which is located in Southeast Texas. The Texas Legislature established the authority in 1937 as the San Jacinto River Conservation and Reclamation District. In 1951, the legislature gave the SJRA its current name. The authority has managed the Lake Conroe reservoir since its impoundment in 1973.

As part of a plan to reduce groundwater usage, the San Jacinto River Authority pumps surface water from Lake Conroe for use by cities and other entities in Montgomery County. The SJRA charges the cities usage fees to cover the cost of pumping and treating the water. In 2016, the SJRA filed a lawsuit against Conroe and Magnolia because the cities refused to pay increased water fees resulting from the groundwater reduction plan. The lawsuit was dismissed in June 2020.
