= Hubbard Law =

American football player (1921–1995)

No. 34, 56
- Position: Guard

Personal information
- Born: January 27, 1921; Houston, Texas, U.S.
- Died: March 29, 1995 (aged 74); Mesa, Arizona, U.S.
- Listed height: 6 ft 1 in (1.85 m)
- Listed weight: 210 lb (95 kg)

Career information
- High school: Willis (Willis, Texas)
- College: Sam Houston State (1938–1941)
- NFL draft: 1942: 131st round, 15th overall pick

Career history
- Pittsburgh Steelers (1942–1947)

Career NFL statistics
- Games played: 17
- Rushing yards: 6
- Interceptions: 1
- Stats at Pro Football Reference

Hubbard Paul Law (January 27, 1921 — March 29, 1995) was an American professional football guard who played six seasons with the Pittsburgh Steelers of the National Football League (NFL). He played college football at Sam Houston State University for the Sam Houston State Bearkats football team.
