= Willis High School =

Public high school in Willis, Texas, United States

Coordinates: 30.3923°N 95.4775°W

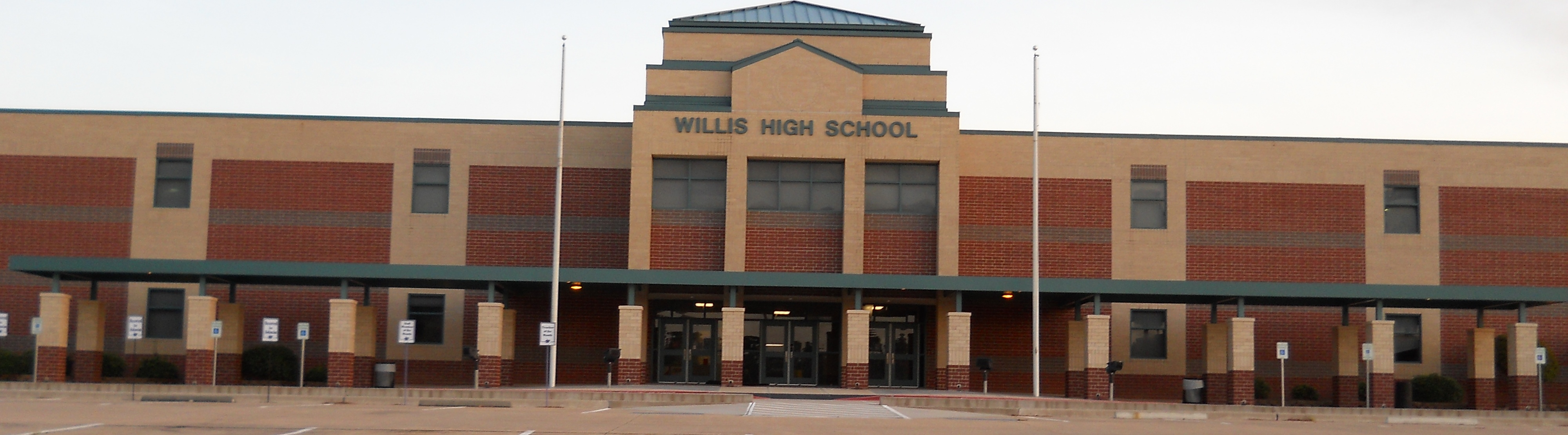

Location
- 1201 FM 830; Willis, Texas 77378; United States

Information
- School type: Public high school
- Motto: "One Team, One Purpose"
- Established: 1996
- School district: Willis Independent School District
- CEEB code: 447565
- NCES School ID: 484590005228
- Principal: Tiffany Mathews
- Faculty: 143.01 (on an FTE basis)
- Grades: 9-12
- Enrollment: 2,809 (2024–2025)
- Student to teacher ratio: 19.64
- Campus: Rural: Fringe
- Colors: Purple & White
- Athletics conference: UIL Class 6A
- Mascot: Wildkat
- Website: Willis High School

Willis High School is a public high school in the city limits of Conroe, Texas, United States. with a Willis, Texas post office address. It is a part of the Willis Independent School District. The school received a B grade from the Texas Education Agency in the 2024-25 school year.

== History ==
The school opened in 1996, replacing the previous Willis High School that opened in 1974, which is now known as Lynn Lucas Middle School. In 2004 the school had about 1,440 students. Ben Cooper was the principal until 2006. That year, Tim Patton became the principal. On June 10, 2010, he was reassigned to a position in the district's headquarters.

In 2023 Eric King became the principal.

In 2023 the school had an enrollment of 2,496.

== Demographics ==
In the 2024–2025 school year, there were 2,809 students enrolled at Willis High School. The ethnic distribution of students was as follows:

- 46.7% White
- 39.5% Hispanic
- 8.9% African American
- 0.8% Asian
- 0.5% American Indian
- 0.1% Native Hawaiian/Pacific Islander
- 3.5% Two or More Races

53.3% of students were eligible for free or reduced-price lunch.

== Academics ==
For each academic year, the Texas Education Agency rates school performance using an A–F grading system based on statistical data. For the 2021–2022 school year, the school received a score of 77 out of 100, resulting in a C grade. Due to the COVID-19 pandemic, every school received a label of Not Rated for the 2019-2020 and 2020-2021 school years. For the 2018-2019 school year, the school received a score of 81.

== Programs ==
The district offered a "Kats at Night" (KAN) night school program. The State of Texas provided a $80,000 grant to Willis ISD to establish the program. The first students graduated in October 2004.

=== Fine Arts ===
The school offers the fine arts programs of Band, Choir, Theater, Dance, and Visual Arts

==== Marching Band ====
The Willis Wildkat Band has appeared in two UIL State Marching Band Championships. In 2017, Willis placed 7th in their area competition with their show entitled "Aurora," and finished 25th at State in conference 5A. In 2019, Willis placed 1st in their area competition and finished 26th at State in conference 5A. Both performances were under the direction of Band Director Chris Allen and Assistant Band Director Andrew Hicks.

== Athletics ==
For UIL events, Willis High School competes in class 6A, the classification for the largest schools. For athletics, the school will compete in District 13 with five Conroe ISD schools as part of the smallest 6A district in Texas. The school was only three students above the threshold for entering class 6A in the 2020-2021 season.

=== Football ===
Rick Cullum served as the head American football coach until May 2006. Mack Malone, who was already a part of the athletic staff, replaced him as coach. By 2007 the school was looking for a new coach, and Malone was given a new job.

In 2023, Willis finished first in their district with an 8-0 record under Head Coach Trent Miller and nationally-ranked quarterback DJ Lagway. Willis reached the third round of the UIL 6A Division 2 playoffs. Willis finished their 2023 season with a 12-1 record, and was ranked 65th in MaxPreps national football rankings.

=== Baseball ===
Danny Freeman served as the varsity baseball team coach until 2000, when he became the American football defense coordinator at Montgomery High School.

=== Softball ===
As of 2004 Amanda Bussell served as the varsity softball coach; she graduated from Oak Ridge High School and previously was an assistant at Montgomery High School.

=== Bowling ===
As of 2026, the AlleyKats Bowling Club has won two Texas State High School Bowling Championships.

== Expansions ==
Through a number of bonds voted on by the Willis ISD community, the school has had a number of expansions. In 2006, a bond was approved, which allowed the district to build an expansion for the school, purchase property for a practice field and track, and other renovations to the high school.

In 2015, a bond was approved allowing for a new agricultural science center, a new performing arts center, and a new career & technology education center. This bond also allowed for expansions to the band and choir areas, a new dance studio, and a new black box theater.

In 2020, another bond was approved for the district, but other than maintenance and renovations, no major improvements were made to the high school.

In 2022, there was a portion of a bond approved by voters, which upgraded the school's baseball and softball fields to use synthetic turf, as well as a new middle school that will feed into the high school.

In May 2024, there was a portion of a bond approved by voters to build a ninth-grade expansion to the high school, as well as parking lot upgrades. There were three other propositions that were reconsidered during the 2024 general election, but were rejected for a second time.

== Controversies ==
After a local drag queen was invited as a guest speaker for a cosmetology class in 2019, community backlash resulted in more stringent regulations regarding school speakers.

In December 2023, a Willis High School student was arrested for assaulting his coach after he was benched for unsportsmanlike conduct.

In October 2024, the Willis High School football team was criticized for hitting their opponents in the Cleveland High School team with belts after beating them 77-0.

== Notable alumni ==
- Hubbard Law (1939), former NFL offensive lineman
- James McKeehan (1991), former NFL tight end
- Marcus Luttrell (1993), Navy SEAL, Author of Lone Survivor
- Morgan Luttrell (1993), Navy SEAL, U.S. Representative
- Michael Bishop (1995), former NFL Quarterback
- D. D. Terry (2003), former NFL Running back
- Ira Brown (2005), basketball player who plays overseas and former MiLB player
- DJ Lagway (2024), quarterback for the Florida Gators and the Baylor Bears
- Jermaine Bishop Jr. (2026), wide receiver and cornerback for the Texas Longhorns
