= Willis Independent School District =

School district in Texas, United States

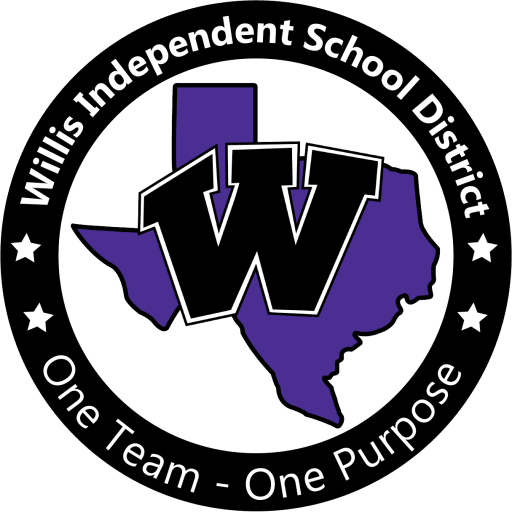

Address
- 204 W Rogers St Willis, Texas, 77378; United States

District information
- Type: Public
- Motto: One Team, One Purpose
- Grades: PK–12
- Established: September 10, 1906
- Superintendent: Kimberley James
- Governing agency: Texas Education Agency
- Schools: 12
- NCES District ID: 4845900

Students and staff
- Enrollment: 9,269 (2024–2025)
- Teachers: 543.6 (on an FTE basis)
- Staff: 1,184.7 (on an FTE basis)
- Student–teacher ratio: 17.1

Other information
- Website: www.willisisd.org

The Willis Independent School District is a public school district based in Willis, Texas, United States.

Located in Montgomery County, the district extends into a portion of San Jacinto County. The cities of Willis and Panorama Village and a small northern portion of the city of Conroe are within WISD.

For the 2024–2025 school year, the district received a "C" from the Texas Education Agency.

== History ==
In 1881 the citizens of Willis, Texas commissioned the construction of a college building. When final payments were made in 1884, the title was passed to Rev. and Mrs. S. N. Barker, who opened Willis Male and Female College in September 1885. In 1890, the location was sold to F.P. Crow and C.H. Stovall, who operated the college for four years. In 1894 the college was briefly sold to Cyril M. Jansky and Marion Kline before operations were returned to Crow. The college was officially closed in 1901 after being sold to the public schools.

Effective September 10, 1906, a public school was opened in the building, marking the beginning of the Willis Independent School District.

There have been three different Willis High School campuses. The Cargill Education Support Center was originally built as the first high school in 1939. In 1974, it was replaced by a new campus, which is now known as Lynn Lucas Middle School. Lynn Lucas served as the high school until 1996, when it was replaced by the current, third Willis High School.

Sometime after 1996, C.C. Hardy Middle School was repurposed as C.C. Hardy Elementary School.

In 2001, three new board members took their positions.

In 2013, an individual sued the district in federal court, accusing it of ignoring a teacher sex abuse case.

In 2019, the Sharon Hill Jennette Administration Building was built as a centralized hub for the district's administrative needs, which were previously spread out across four separate buildings. One of these buildings was the Cargill Education Support Center, which served as the main admin building since its 1974 repurposing until the new one was built. Cargill now serves as a general district support center. The district's previous technology building was demolished due to structural issues. The new admin building was named after the district's longest-serving employee. The construction of the building cost $11 million, which was under budget and did not use bond funds.

On August 4, 2025, the city of Conroe deactivated the water service to the brand new Calfee Middle School before school started on August 13 due to an unresolved development agreement between the district and the city. Water was restored days later on August 7 after an agreement between the city of Conroe and Willis ISD.

== Academics ==
For each school year, the Texas Education Agency rates school district performance using an A–F grading system based on statistical data. For the 2024–2025 school year, the district received a score of 77 out of 100, resulting in a "C".

== Bonds ==
The district has held multiple bond elections for additional schools and improvements to the district and current schools.

=== Bond 1997 ===
In 1997, there was a bond election held for Willis ISD, which passed.

=== Bond 2001 ===
In 2001, there was a bond election held for Willis ISD, which passed with some controversy regarding early voting. The bond included the construction of a new middle school (Brabham Middle School).

=== Bond 2006 ===
In 2006, the Willis ISD board of trustees approved a bond consisting of two propositions that each addressed concerns about the district's future growth. Community members voted on November 7, 2006 to approve both propositions. Proposition 1 consisted of the construction of a new elementary school (Meador Elementary School), the purchase of two elementary school properties, along with additional classrooms and renovations at all elementary campuses. It also consisted of the purchase of a middle school property, renovations to Lynn Lucas Middle School, and field lighting at Brabham Middle School, as well as expansions, renovations, and land for a track and field at the Willis High School. Proposition 2 was for district-wide general improvements such as parking, lighting, and security upgrades, as well as renovations.

=== Bond 2015 ===
In 2015, the Willis ISD board of trustees approved a bond that addressed concerns about the district's future growth without a tax increase. Willis ISD community members voted on November 3, 2015 to approve the bond, which included a new elementary school (Eddie Ruth Lagway Elementary School), an expansion to Brabham Middle School, new field turf for Yates Stadium at Lynn Lucas Middle School, driveway improvements at four campuses, and land purchases. There were also renovations and additions to Willis High School, which included a new agricultural science center, a new performing arts center, and a new career & technology education center. The new auditorium would replace the district's only auditorium at Lynn Lucas Middle School. There were also other additions to the high school, including expanding the choir and band areas.

=== Bond 2020 ===
In 2020, the Willis ISD board of trustees approved a bond consisting of three propositions that each addressed concerns about the district's future growth. The vote was originally slated for May, but because of the COVID-19 pandemic, it was delayed to November. The original bond, however, was canceled, and was replaced with a new bond, which only included Proposition A of the original bond but with no tax increase. Willis ISD community members voted in the 2020 general election to approve Proposition A, which included an expansion to Lynn Lucas Middle School, a new Pre-kindergarten center to replace the original Roark Early Education Center (built 1965) while maintaining the same name, additions to the gymnasiums of the elementary schools (excluding C. C. Hardy Elementary School), and other renovations to all of the campuses. The original Roark building was repurposed for district storage.

=== Bond 2022 ===
In 2022, the Willis ISD board of trustees approved a bond consisting of three propositions that each addressed concerns about the district's future growth. Willis ISD community members voted on May 7, 2022 to approve Proposition A, which included a new middle school (Homer C. Calfee Middle School), a new elementary school (Ruth Castleschouldt Elementary School), a fine arts expansion to Lynn Lucas Middle School, upgrades to playground equipment, synthetic turf at Willis High School baseball and softball fields, and future land purchases. All this totaled to around $143 million. The rest of the propositions were denied.

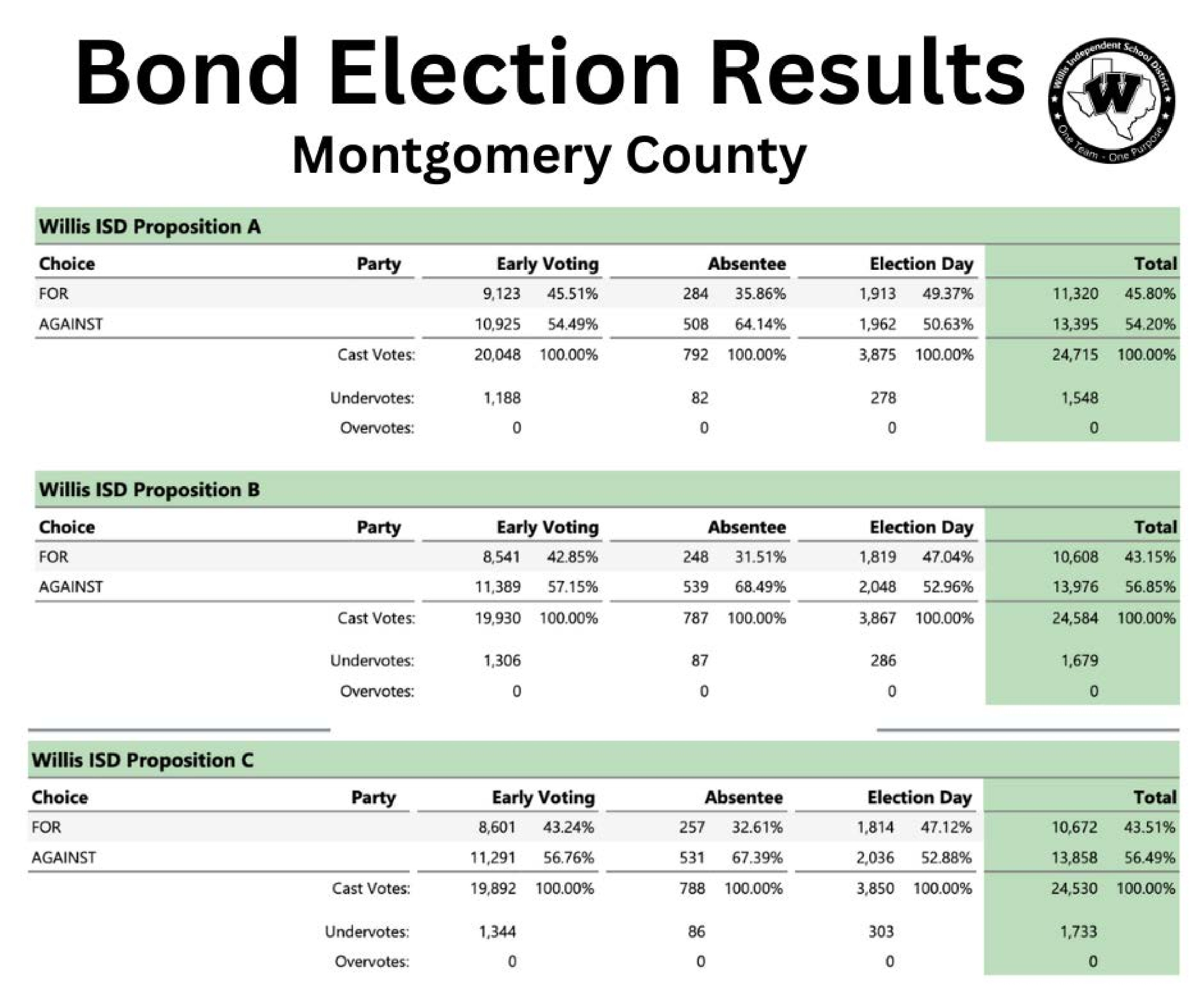
Results for disapproval of all the proposals in the bond from the 2024 general election. (Note: The results for San Jacinto County are not included in this image.)

=== Bond 2024 ===
In 2024, the Willis ISD board of trustees approved a bond consisting of four propositions that each addressed concerns about the district's future growth. Willis ISD community members voted in May of that year to approve Proposition A to build a 9th-grade expansion to the high school, high school parking lot upgrades, and a new district transportation center. The rest of the propositions were denied. In the 2024 general election, the failed propositions were reconsidered but were once again rejected.

== Schools ==
=== High Schools (Grades 9-12) ===
- Willis High School – located in Willis (opened 1996)
  - Replaced the previous Willis High School, which has since been renamed to Lynn Lucas Middle School.

=== Middle Schools (Grades 6-8) ===
- Lynn Lucas Middle School – located in Willis (opened 1974 as Willis High School)
  - Replaced the original Willis High School, built in 1939, and was renamed to its current name after the current Willis High School was built.
- Robert P. Brabham Middle School – located in Willis (opened 2004)
  - Opening was delayed one year despite being ready for students. This decision was criticized by the community and the district has admitted that it was a mistake on their part.
- Homer C. Calfee Middle School – located in Conroe (opened 2025)

=== Elementary Schools (Grades K-5) ===
- C. C. Hardy Elementary School – located in Willis (opened 1983 as C. C. Hardy Middle School)
  - Converted from a middle school to an elementary school sometime after 1996.
- Mel Parmley Elementary School – located in Willis (opened 1987 as Willis Elementary School)
- A. R. Turner Elementary School – located in Willis (opened 1993)
  - It was named after an African-American school principal. The first Turner ES, a twelve-room building then designated for Black students, opened in 1956.
- Edward B. Cannan Elementary School – located in Willis (opened 1999)
- William Lloyd Meador Elementary School – located in Willis (opened 2008)
- Eddie Ruth Lagway Elementary School – located in Conroe (opened 2021)
- Ruth Castleschouldt Elementary School – located in Conroe (opens 2026)

=== Other schools ===
- Roark Early Education Center – a school for Pre-kindergarten – located in Willis (opened 2022)
  - Replaced the original Roark Early Education Center, built in 1965.
- Stubblefield Alternative Academy – a Disciplinary Alternative Education Program – located in Willis

The district also participates in the Montgomery County JJAEP alternative education program, which is operated by Montgomery County in partnership with Conroe Independent School District.
