= Montgomery County Memorial Library System =

Public library system

Coordinates: 30.3929°N 95.6914°W

Montgomery County Memorial Library System is a public library system in Montgomery County, Texas, United States. The system operates libraries in several Montgomery County cities and areas.

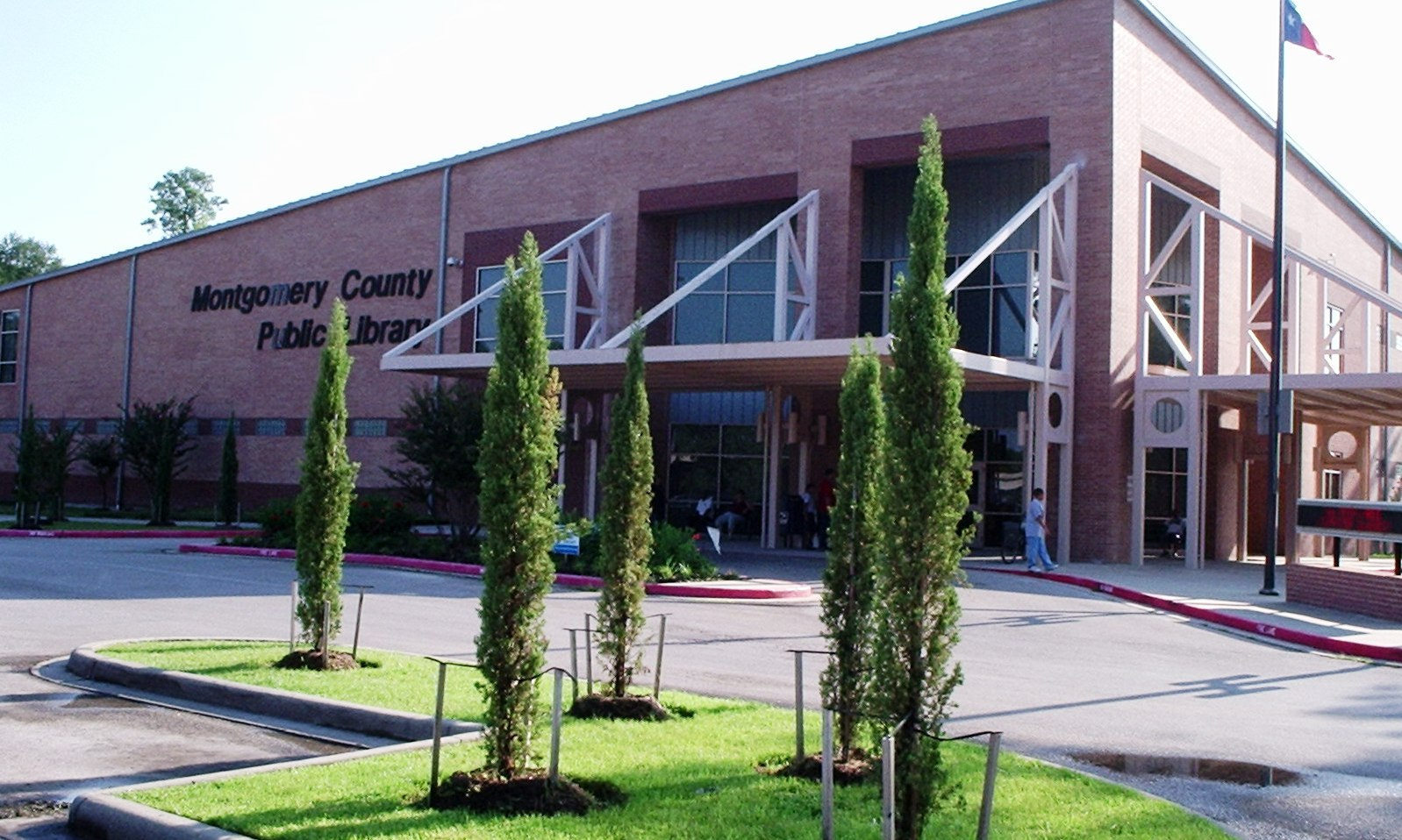
Conroe branch of Montgomery County Library

== History ==
The library started with 1,200 items inside the Conroe School Recreation Center in 1946. It was originally maintained by a women's group known as the HUB Club. In 1948 the library became a branch of the Montgomery County government, with an allocated budget of US$25,000. The first librarian was Katherine Ard. A bookmobile was purchased to help serve the outer areas of Montgomery County.

In 1950 the library was relocated to a vacated automobile showroom. Five years later, a $300,000 bond was approved for a new 10,000 square feet (930 m^{2}) library, which was finished in 1957.

A second bookmobile was added in 1967. In 1970 Mattie Howard was selected to replace Ard as the library director. The satellite East Branch Library, located in a leased area of a shopping mall between the towns of New Caney and Porter, was opened in 1974.

In 1975 Hank Blasick was appointed director of the library. A year later the Central Library in Conroe was expanded, adding 3,000 square feet (280 m^{2}), and the South Branch Library opened in The Woodlands Information Center. In 1978 the 5,500 square feet (510 m^{2}) South Branch Library building was completed with the help of donations and a federal LSCA grant of $75,000.

In 1980 the Central Library was enclosed, with additional square footage giving the building a total of 15,000 square feet (1,400 m^{2}). On June 21, 1980, the Central Library suffered fire damage, with many books destroyed. The Central Library was forced to close until April 1981.

David Calloway become the library director in May 1981. In 1983, the bookmobile service was discontinued and the East Branch Library was moved to the East County Courthouse Annex. In 1985, the Magnolia Branch Library, with 2,800 square feet (260 m^{2}), was opened in the Southwest County Annex. In October 1986, the East Branch Library was given its own 6,400-square-foot (590 m^{2}) building next to the East County Annex in New Caney.

In April 1987, Mike Baldwin was selected to be library director. A month later, Commissioners' Court renamed the East Branch to R.B. Tullis Library. In June 1988, a West Branch Library opened inside the Western Hills Shopping Center. The space was donated with three years of free rent.

In 1991, County Judge Alan B. Sadler appointed a Citizens' Library Task Force charged with determining the library services needs of county residents. In July, the West Branch Library was approved for expansion using LSCA grant money and matching funds from the county by purchasing additional space in the Western Hills Shopping Center. A month later, the Library Task Force recommended a bond election for $9.25 million to build new facilities in Conroe, The Woodlands, and Magnolia, as well as using $500,000 for new books throughout the system, and $750,000 for automation and computerization of the library system. On November 5, the bond election was held and approved with 63% of the vote.

The South Branch Library in The Woodlands was set on fire via arson in January 1992. In May of that year, the library reopened in a temporary location filled with thousands of donated books. In July, an LSCA grant for $100,000 was approved by the State Library to assist in the construction of the new South Regional Library. The expanded West Branch Library was opened to the public on November 20, 1992.

In March 1993, the library system received a grant from Houston Area Library System (HALS) to assist with library system automation. In July, Commissioners' Court, in conjunction with NHMCCD, approved a five-year contract with SirsiDynix.

The temporary facility for the South Branch Library closed on May 16, 1994, to allow materials to be moved to the new facility. On June 13, the new South Regional Library was opened to the public. The Central Library was then closed to allow for its move. On July 25, the new Central Library in Conroe opened its doors to the public. The South Regional Library and Central Library held their grand openings on September 10 and September 17, respectively.

Groundbreaking for the new Magnolia branch building was held in February 1997. Jerilynn A. Williams was appointed library director on June 2, 1997. In September, public access to the internet was added as a library service. In October, the new Magnolia Branch was renamed Malcolm Purvis Magnolia Branch Library in honor of Commissioner Malcolm Purvis. The grand opening was held on November 22, 1997.

During the 1999 fiscal year, the Montgomery County Memorial Library System circulated over one million items for the first time. A total of 1,021,324 items were circulated that fiscal year. The library system was also awarded grants from the Bill and Melinda Gates Foundation to continue offering computer services to the public, including funding for a computer training lab.

A Planning Task Force was created in 2001 to determine the library service needs of county residents and to recommend a course of action for the library. In January 2002, a Facilities Master Plan was accepted. A $10 million bond issue was added to the November ballot to fund new buildings for the R.B. Tullis and West Branch libraries and to add a new facility in the western reaches of The Woodlands. The bond passed with a 52% margin despite strong opposition led by a group of citizens opposed to an increase in taxes.

== Book access and classification ==
Montgomery County Texas has had a divisive string of book challenges. In August 2002, a group of citizens attended a meeting of the Commissioners' Court to push for the removal of Robie Harris' It's Perfectly Normal due to complaints that the title was inappropriate. At first, the directive was given to remove the work from library shelves, which was a violation of the very policy that the court had approved just six years earlier. Shortly thereafter, it was agreed that the book would be reconsidered in keeping with the established procedures. The Republican Leadership Council (RLC) pushed for a change in policy on how the committee was composed. Previously, it was made up of five librarians; this was amended to include five citizens as well. The RLC also started a campaign to combat a bond issue to raise $10 million for library expansions, citing tax increases as the reason for the campaign.

In 2003, a library takeover was planned by County Judge Alan B. Sadler that resulted in an investigation by the Montgomery County District Attorney and a confidential settlement regarding violations of Texas open meeting laws. Sadler sought to give control over the approval of all materials procured by the library to the county commission. As a result of these ongoing struggles, Library Director Jerilynn A. Williams received the PEN First Amendment Award in 2003.

In 2024, county judge Mark Keough authored a new policy of citizen committee to review and potentially remove library materials at the request of the public. Under this policy, any book challenged by a community member is immediately moved to the adult section until the citizen review committee reconsiders the content. The citizen review committee is selected by the court, and as of the passing of the policy does not contain any librarians. In September of 2024, the committee ordered a children's book about the mistreatment of Wampanoag native Americans be moved from the nonfiction section to the fiction section of the library.

== Branches ==
- Central Library (Conroe)
- Malcolm Purvis Magnolia Branch Library (Magnolia)
- Charles B. Stewart - West Branch Library (Montgomery)
- South Regional Branch Library (The Woodlands)
- R.B. Tullis Branch Library (New Caney)
- R.F. Meador Branch (Willis)
- George & Cynthia Woods Mitchell Library (The Woodlands)

The Central Library in Conroe houses the fourth largest genealogical collection in Texas, with an emphasis on Southern U.S. genealogy.
