= Lynching of Tom Payne =

1927 lynching of a Black man in Texas

Tom or Thomas Payne was an African-American man who was murdered in Willis, Texas on February 1, 1927. After his arrest in connection with an assault and murder, a white mob abducted and hanged him from a tree.
