= Lake Conroe =

Man-made reservoir in Texas, United States

- Location within Texas Location within the United States

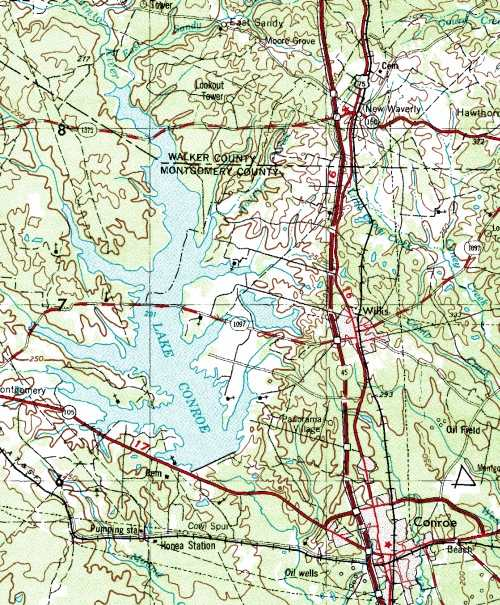
- Map of lake and surrounding areas
- Location: Montgomery / Walker counties, near Conroe, Texas
- Coordinates: 30°21′25″N 95°33′37″W
- Lake type: reservoir
- Basin countries: United States
- Surface area: 21,000 acres (85 km^{2})
- Average depth: 20.5 ft (6.2 m)
- Max. depth: 79 ft (24 m)
- Water volume: 0.53 km^{3} (0.13 cu mi)
- Surface elevation: 201 ft (61 m)
- Islands: Bird Island, Pax and Noah Island
- Settlements: Conroe
- References: Lake Conroe

Lake Conroe is a 21,000-acre (85 km^{2}) lake in Montgomery County, Texas, United States. Even though it is named Lake Conroe, only the southern third of the lake is in Conroe, Texas. Most of the lake is in unincorporated Montgomery County, while a small northern sliver juts into neighboring Walker County where the Baker Bridge is located. The lake lies on the West Fork of the San Jacinto River, just west of Interstate 45 off State Highway 105 in Montgomery and Walker counties. Lake Conroe is a popular attraction for boating, jet-skiing, and fishing.

== Situation ==
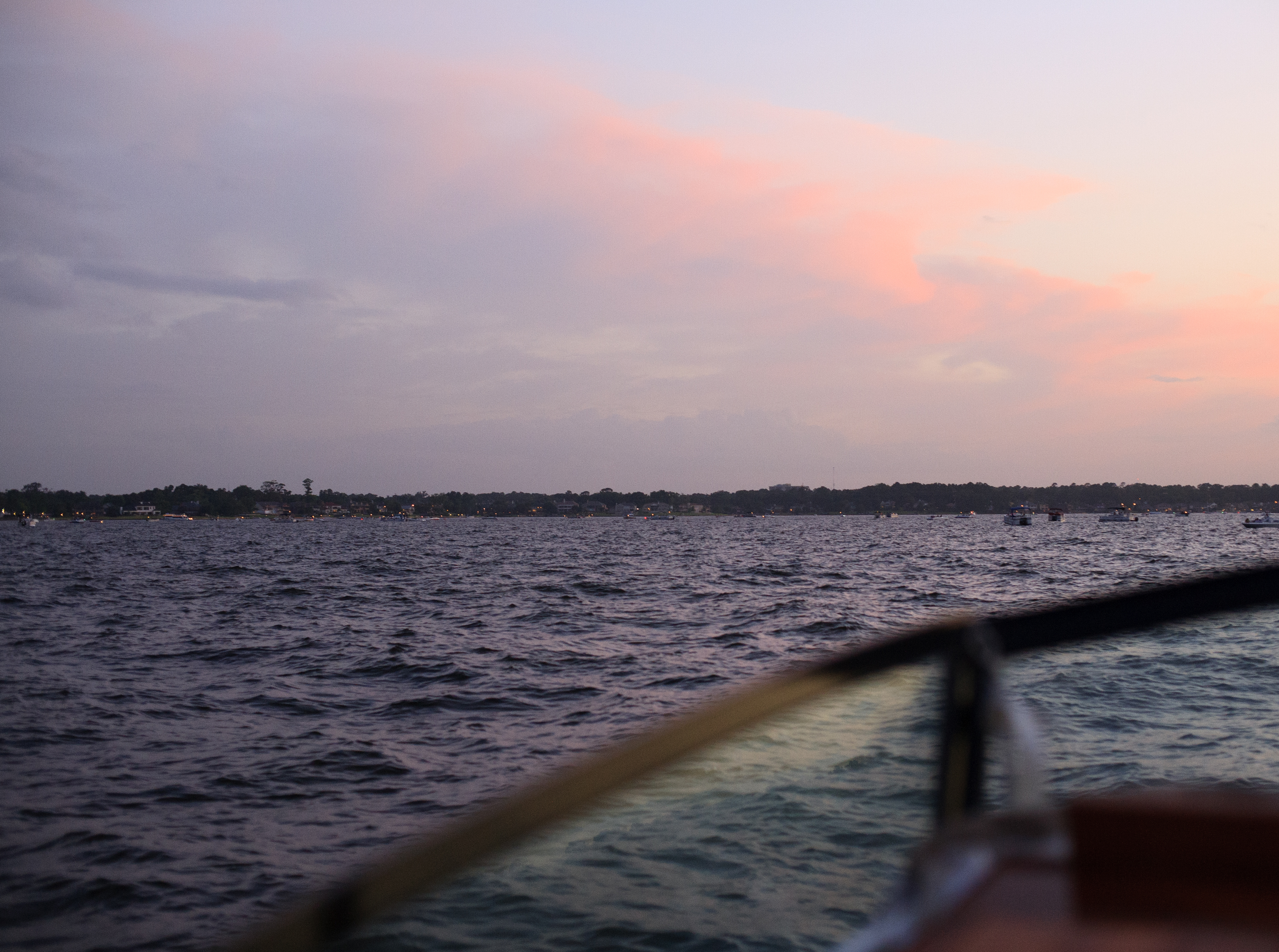
Significant boat traffic at dusk on Independence Day.

The lake runs through classic East Texas Piney Woods forests. Water quality is generally good, with an average depth of 20.5 feet (6.2 m), and a maximum depth of 75 feet (23 m). The controlling authority of the lake is the San Jacinto River Authority. The City of Houston owns a two-thirds interest in the lake; the SJRA owns one-third.

The lake extends about 21 miles (34 km) in length and covers 20,118 acres (81.41 km^{2}) with 5,000 acres (20 km^{2}) in Sam Houston National Forest and capacity of 430,260 acre-feet (530,720,000 m^{3}). The lake was conceived in 1970 as an alternative water supply for the City of Houston. Alternative names including Honea Reservoir and Conroe Lake were considered, with Lake Conroe decided as the official name. The lake was completed in January 1973; it was filled on October 31, 1973.

A few celebrities, such as Rudy Tomjanovich, Roger Clemens, Aaron Gray, Colin Edwards, and Lieutenant Governor Dan Patrick have residences in the Lake Conroe area.

== Coast Guard Auxiliary ==
United States Coast Guard Auxiliary flotilla 6-9 operates on Lake Conroe with a volunteer staff since 1978. Currently the Flotilla is commanded by Jeff Huhs.
