= Conroe, Texas =

Conroe
- City
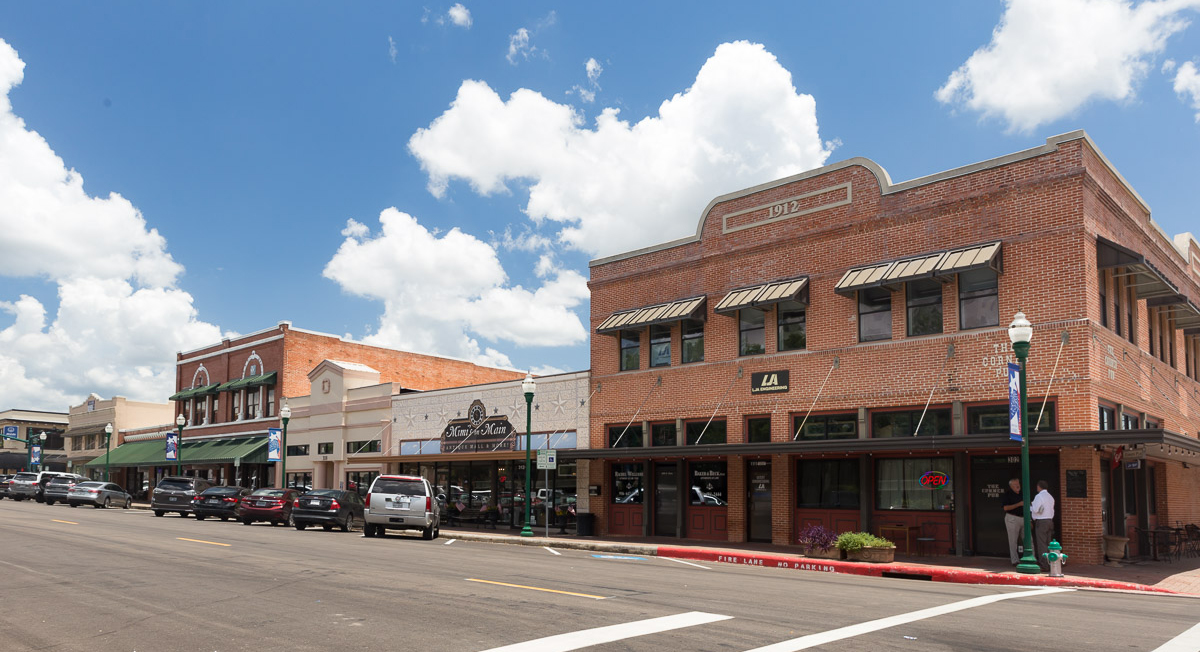
- Downtown Conroe

- Location in Montgomery County in the state of Texas
- Coordinates: 30°18′44″N 95°27′25″W
- Country: United States
- State: Texas
- County: Montgomery
- Incorporated: 1904

Government
  - Type: Mayor-Council
  - City Council: Mayor Duke W. Coon; Marsha Porter; Howard Wood; Harry Hardman; Shana Arthur; David Hairel
  - City Administrator: Gary Scott

Area
  - Total: 72.76 sq mi (188.45 km^{2})
  - Land: 72.00 sq mi (186.47 km^{2})
  - Water: 0.77 sq mi (1.99 km^{2})
- Elevation: 205 ft (62.5 m)

Population (2020)
  - Total: 89,956
  - Estimate (2024): 114,581
  - Density: 1,249/sq mi (482.4/km^{2})
- Time zone: UTC-6 (CST)
  - Summer (DST): UTC-5 (CDT)
- ZIP code(s): 77301–77304, 77306, 77384, 77385
- PO Box code(s): 77305
- Area code: 936
- FIPS code: 48-16432
- GNIS feature ID: 1333238
- Website: www.cityofconroe.org

Conroe is a city in and the county seat of Montgomery County, Texas, United States, about 40 miles (64 km) north of Houston. It is a principal city in the Houston–Pasadena–The Woodlands metropolitan area.

As of 2024, the population was 114,581. Since 2007, the city has increased in size (and population) by annexation, with the city territory expanding from 52.8 to 74.4 square miles. Some communities have attempted to fight such annexation. According to the Census Bureau, Conroe was the fastest-growing large city in the United States between July 1, 2015, and July 1, 2016.

== History ==
The city is named after Isaac Conroe. Born in the North, he served as a Union Cavalry officer and settled in Houston after the Civil War. There, he became a lumberman. Conroe founded a sawmill in this area in 1881. The community built its early economy and wealth on the lumber industry. Originally named "Conroe's Switch", the community received an influx of workers and residents in the late 19th century who were attracted to the growth of the lumber industry, which harvested the local piney wood forest.

In 1886, Conroe Mill School was established in the expanding town. Conroe Normal and Industrial College, a school for African Americans, served the area.

Six lynchings were recorded in Montgomery County around the turn of the century, and some suspects were lynched at the courthouse in Conroe. In 1922, a young black man named Joe Winters was lynched, burned alive on the courthouse square for allegedly attacking a young white woman. Within the black community, he was known to be in a consensual relationship with the woman, who denied it when they were discovered.

In 1941, Bob White was shot to death in the courthouse, during his third trial. The African-American man was arrested in 1936 on charges of assaulting a white woman in Livingston, Texas. (Alternative accounts in the black community said they had a standing consensual relationship.) He was first tried there, before an all-white jury. They convicted him. The case was appealed with the help of the NAACP in Houston because he had not been given a lawyer or been able to contact family, and he was tortured in interrogation. The second trial was held in Conroe for a change of venue. Another all-white jury convicted White again. The case reached the United States Supreme Court on appeal, which had just ruled that coerced confessions were unconstitutional and remanded the case to the lower court for trial. During the proceedings in the courtroom, in front of the judge and numerous witnesses, the husband of the alleged victim shot White in the back of the head, instantly killing him. The husband was arrested and tried the following week and was acquitted.

In 1931, George W. Strake discovered the Conroe Oil Field. Distillate and natural gas were produced from the Cockfield Formation at a depth around 5,000 feet (1,500 m). A second well in 1932 produced 1200 BOPD. By 1935, the field had produced 40 million barrels of oil.

During the 1930s, because of oil profits, the city briefly boasted more millionaires per capita than any other U.S. city. After the construction of Interstate 45 in the postwar period improved automobile access, many Houstonians began to follow the highway to new suburban communities that developed around Conroe.

== Geography ==
The Office of Management and Budget classifies Conroe as a principal city within the Houston–Pasadena–The Woodlands metropolitan area. The city is about 40 miles (64 km) north of Houston.

=== Annexation ===
When Conroe incorporated in 1904, the city limits encompassed a 5.44 square mile area. From 1970 to 2000, the city limits expanded from 7.15 square miles to 42.35 square miles. Beginning in 2007, the city outlined a plan to continue expanding its city limits through annexation. According to Chapter 43 of the Texas Local Government Code, home rule municipalities like Conroe may annex territory that is adjacent to the city's current boundaries, with certain restrictions. The city's 2007 plan projected doubling its size through a combination of voluntary and involuntary annexations. As of 2022, the city has annexed territory every year since 2007, increasing the city limits from 52.8 to 77.5 square miles.

In April 2015, residents of the gated community of April Sound filed a lawsuit against Conroe after their community was annexed on January 1, 2015. The lawsuit was dismissed in March 2017. Involuntary annexations were a major issue in the 2016 mayoral election, the first after April Sound residents were incorporated into the city. Proponents of annexation contended that it was a useful tool to "promote and facilitate growth and progress," while those in opposition were concerned about whether annexed territories receive a "fair shake" in the negotiations. In 2017, the city council voted in favor of additional involuntary annexations.

=== Ecosystem ===
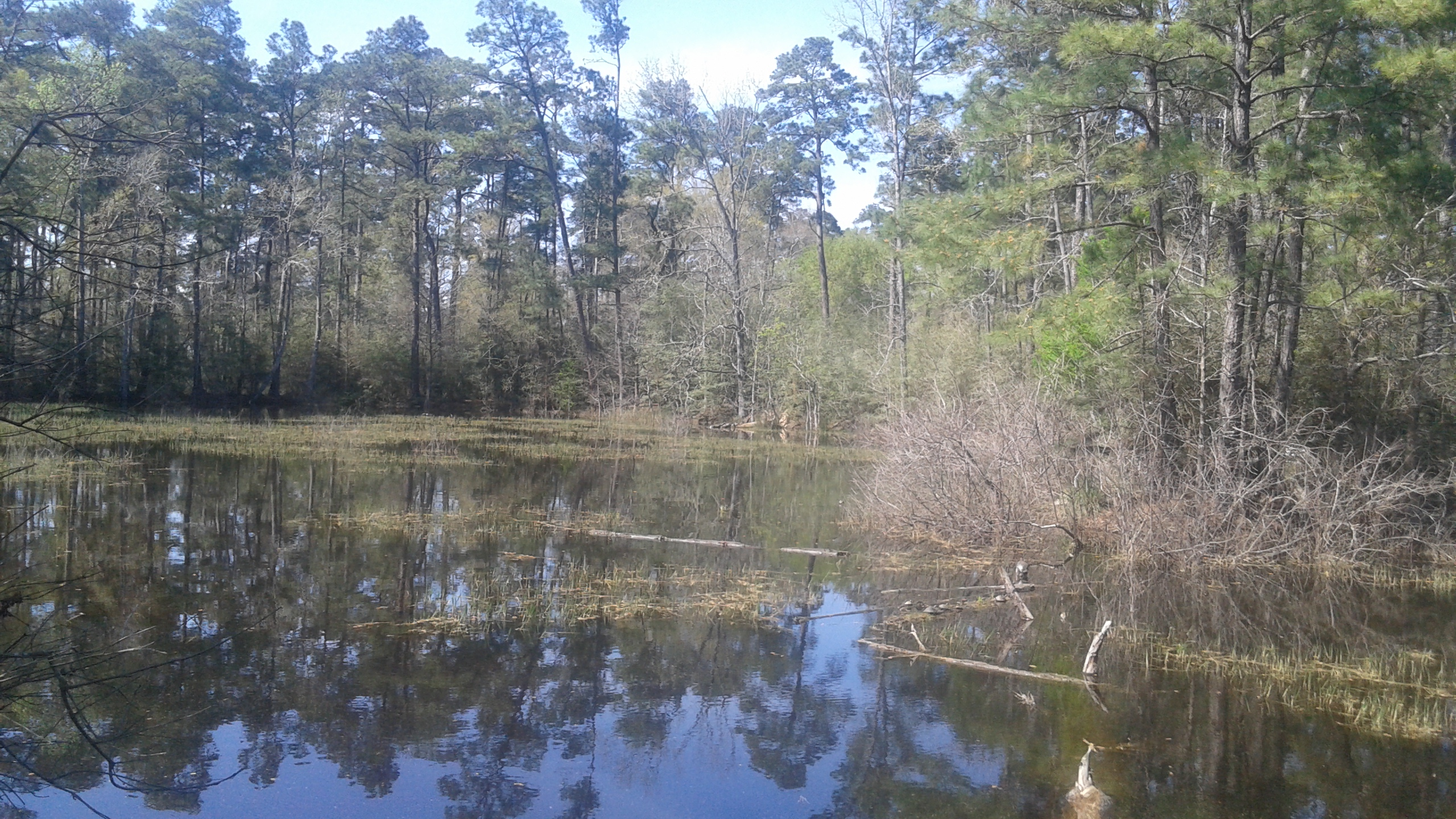
Middle Lake on the southern side of Jones State Forest.

Conroe is in the southwest corner of the East Texas Piney Woods, which consist of pine trees and hardwood forests. The most common type of tree in the southwest Piney Woods is the loblolly pine. Shortleaf pines are also abundant. Pockets of blackland prairie vegetation are also present, but are disappearing due to urbanization.

In 1926, the Texas A&M Forest Service purchased 1700 acres of Piney Woods to establish W. Goodrich Jones State Forest. It serves as a research and demonstration area for sustainable forestry techniques. The forest also preserves the habitat of the red-cockaded woodpecker, a species classified in the early 21st century as near threatened by the International Union for Conservation of Nature.

In 2017, Texas A&M asked Conroe state senator Brandon Creighton to author a bill setting aside 10% of the forest for educational and research-related development. The bill also opened the possibility of commercial development on the land. Public concern over the bill persuaded Creighton to revise it. The final version, which passed the Senate unanimously, protected the entire forest from development.

=== Water resources ===
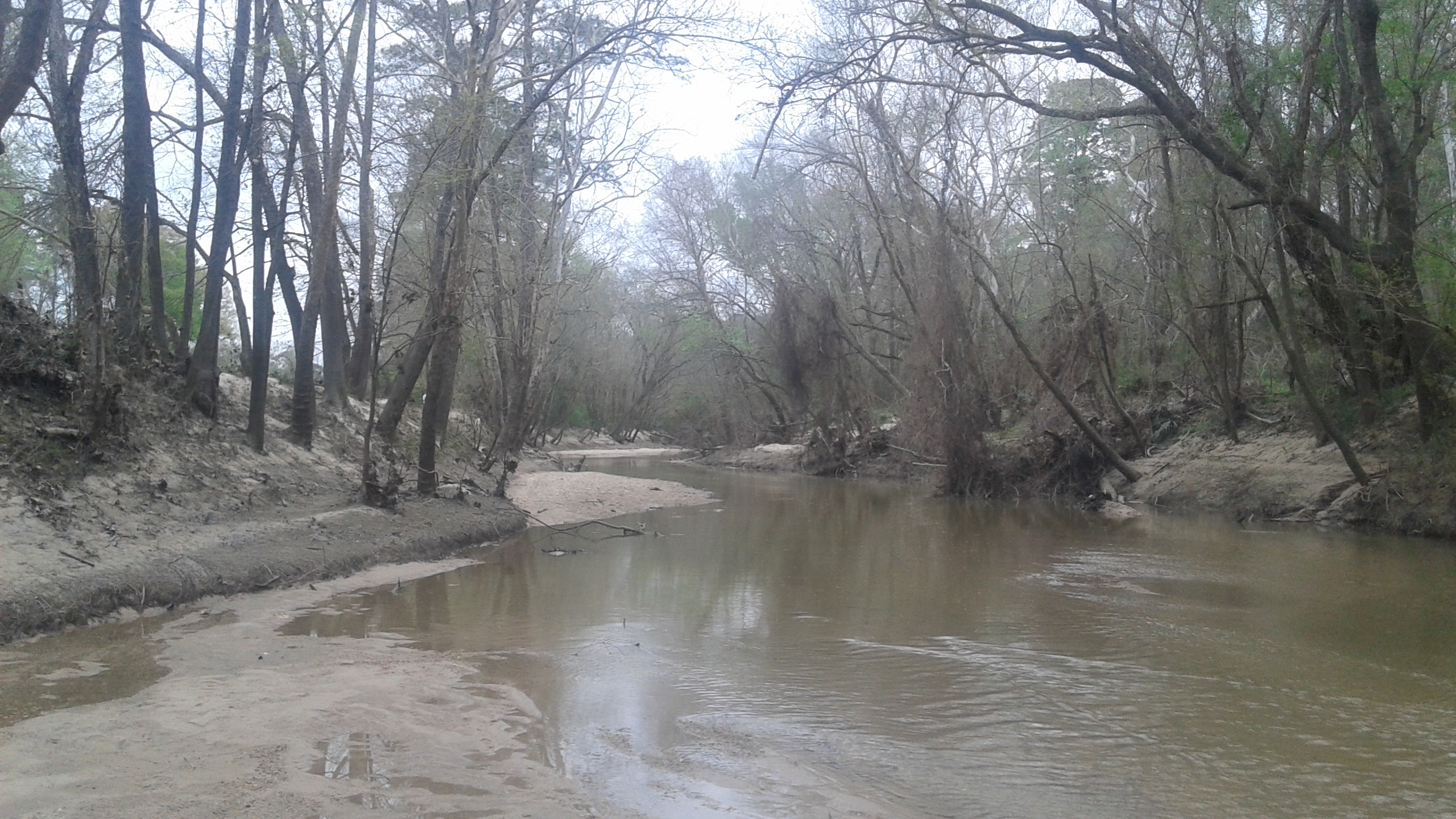
The West Fork of the San Jacinto River as seen from McDade Park on the western edge of Conroe.

The West Fork of the San Jacinto River flows through the western edge of Conroe. The entire city is within the river's watershed. The river flows southeast from Lake Conroe, a 19,640-surface-acre lake created by a dam in 1973 to establish an alternative source of drinking water for Houston.

Conroe developed over several geologic layers of underground aquifers, which supply the city with fresh drinking water. Due to rapid development in this area and the increased population of Conroe and the surrounding area, the groundwater supply is being withdrawn faster than it can be replenished. As a result, the Lone Star Groundwater Conservation District (LSGCD), which oversees groundwater usage in Montgomery County, mandated that Conroe reduce its groundwater usage by 30% of 2009 amounts by January 1, 2016. As part of the groundwater usage reduction plan, the San Jacinto River Authority (SJRA) began in September 2015 to supplement Conroe's groundwater supply with surface water pumped from Lake Conroe. The SJRA charges the city usage fees to cover the cost of pumping and treating the water.

On August 27, 2015, the City of Conroe filed a lawsuit against the LSGCD, claiming that the LSGCD did not have the authority to limit the city's groundwater usage. The city also refused to pay SJRA water usage fee increases in 2016, resulting in a separate lawsuit filed by the SJRA against the city. The LSGCD and Conroe reached a settlement agreement in January 2019. The SJRA case was dismissed in June 2020.

Parts of Conroe surrounding the West Fork of the San Jacinto River are in a floodplain. Significant flooding occurs along the floodplain when rainfall exceeds 9 inches in a 48-hour period. The Conroe area has about a 10% chance of receiving this much rainfall in any given year. Urban development in Conroe and the surrounding area has also exacerbated the risk of flooding. Montgomery County had 500-year floods in three successive years, in May 2015, April 2016, and August 2017. A 500-year flood has a 0.2% chance of occurring in a year. In addition, a fourth major flood occurred in May 2016, resulting in two major floods in two months.

The flooding in August 2017 took place during Hurricane Harvey, when nearly 32 inches of rain fell on the city. To protect the integrity of the dam, SJRA officials released 79,100 cubic feet/second of water from Lake Conroe downstream into the West Fork of the San Jacinto River, exacerbating flooding already taking place in the floodplain. Conroe city officials ordered a mandatory evacuation of McDade Estates, a neighborhood on the banks of the river. As a response to the flooding, Montgomery County commissioners in October 2017 requested $1.25 million from the federal government for a flood mitigation study, along with an additional $95.5 million to implement various flood mitigation projects.

=== Climate ===
The climate in this area is characterized by hot, humid summers and generally mild to cool winters. According to the Köppen climate classification, Conroe has a humid subtropical climate, Cfa on climate maps.

Climate data for Conroe, 1991–2020 normals, (Note: Mean monthly maxima and minima (i.e. the highest and lowest temperature readings during an entire month or year) calculated based on data at said location from 1991 to 2020.) extremes 1897–present
Month	Jan	Feb	Mar	Apr	May	Jun	Jul	Aug	Sep	Oct	Nov	Dec	Year
Record high °F (°C)	84 (29)	91 (33)	96 (36)	98 (37)	100 (38)	105 (41)	108 (42)	109 (43)	109 (43)	102 (39)	94 (34)	89 (32)	109 (43)
Mean maximum °F (°C)	77.3 (25.2)	80.0 (26.7)	84.5 (29.2)	88.1 (31.2)	93.5 (34.2)	97.1 (36.2)	99.4 (37.4)	100.9 (38.3)	96.7 (35.9)	91.6 (33.1)	83.9 (28.8)	79.1 (26.2)	101.8 (38.8)
Mean daily maximum °F (°C)	62.7 (17.1)	66.7 (19.3)	73.5 (23.1)	79.7 (26.5)	86.5 (30.3)	92.3 (33.5)	94.9 (34.9)	95.8 (35.4)	90.4 (32.4)	82.1 (27.8)	71.8 (22.1)	64.1 (17.8)	80.0 (26.7)
Daily mean °F (°C)	52.3 (11.3)	56.3 (13.5)	62.8 (17.1)	69.3 (20.7)	76.6 (24.8)	82.4 (28.0)	84.7 (29.3)	85.1 (29.5)	80.2 (26.8)	71.2 (21.8)	61.2 (16.2)	53.9 (12.2)	69.7 (20.9)
Mean daily minimum °F (°C)	41.9 (5.5)	45.9 (7.7)	52.1 (11.2)	58.9 (14.9)	66.7 (19.3)	72.6 (22.6)	74.4 (23.6)	74.4 (23.6)	70.0 (21.1)	60.4 (15.8)	50.7 (10.4)	43.7 (6.5)	59.3 (15.2)
Mean minimum °F (°C)	25.4 (−3.7)	29.3 (−1.5)	33.4 (0.8)	41.9 (5.5)	52.4 (11.3)	64.2 (17.9)	68.4 (20.2)	68.4 (20.2)	57.3 (14.1)	42.8 (6.0)	32.5 (0.3)	28.1 (−2.2)	23.6 (−4.7)
Record low °F (°C)	5 (−15)	6 (−14)	18 (−8)	29 (−2)	40 (4)	47 (8)	57 (14)	57 (14)	43 (6)	26 (−3)	21 (−6)	3 (−16)	3 (−16)
Average precipitation inches (mm)	4.38 (111)	3.32 (84)	3.46 (88)	3.39 (86)	5.46 (139)	5.21 (132)	3.32 (84)	4.53 (115)	3.69 (94)	5.39 (137)	4.77 (121)	4.10 (104)	51.02 (1,295)
Average precipitation days (≥ 0.1 in)	8.4	7.9	6.5	6.3	6.2	7.3	7.0	6.9	6.5	6.2	6.8	8.6	94
Source: NOAA

== Demographics ==
Historical population
Census	Pop.	Note	%±
1910	1,374		—
1920	1,858		35.2%
1930	2,457		32.2%
1940	4,624		88.2%
1950	7,298		57.8%
1960	9,192		26.0%
1970	11,969		30.2%
1980	18,034		50.7%
1990	27,610		53.1%
2000	36,811		33.3%
2010	56,207		52.7%
2020	89,956		60.0%
2024 (est.)	114,581		27.4%
U.S. Decennial Census 2010–2020, 2024

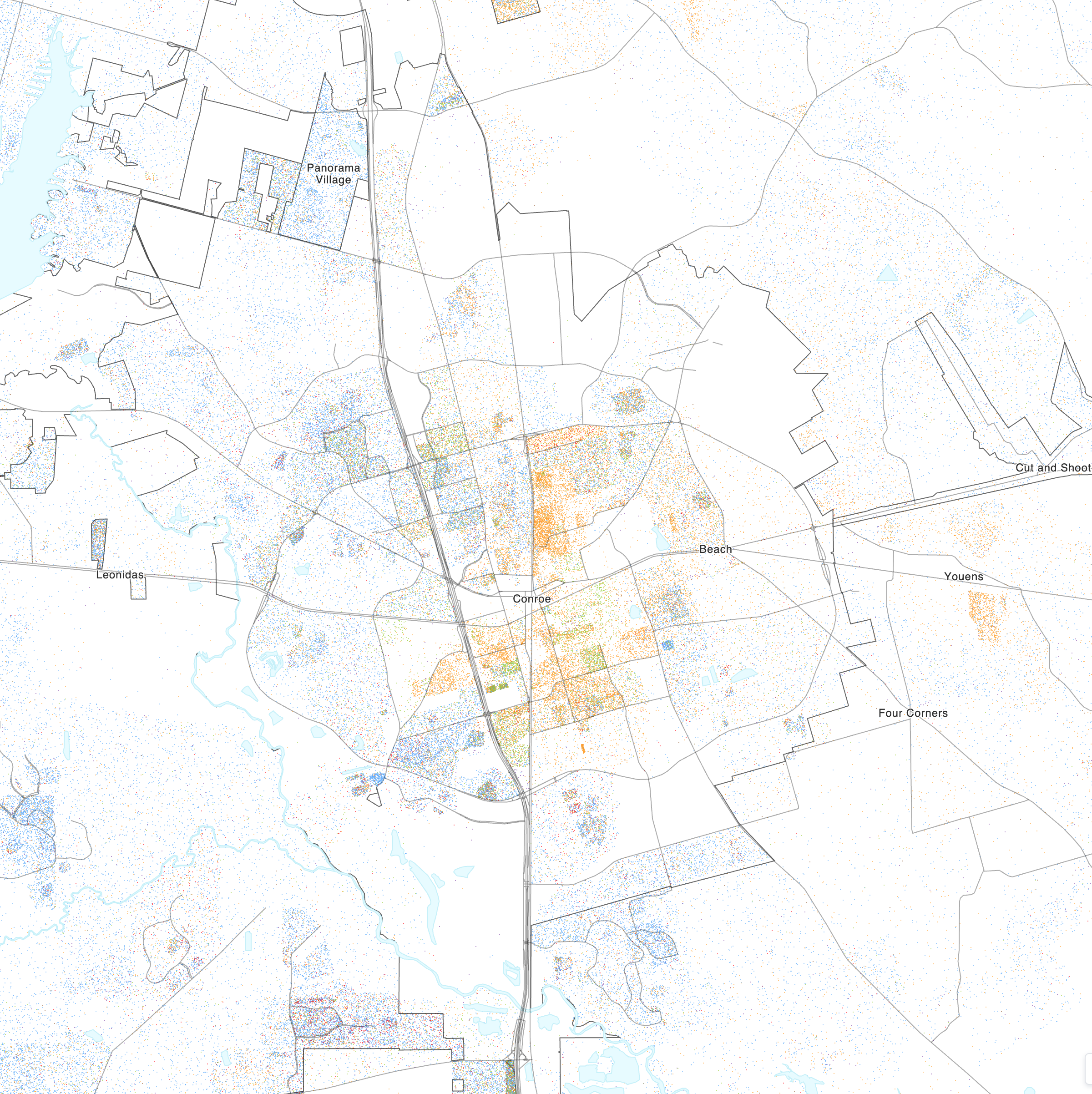
Map of racial distribution in Conroe, 2020 U.S. census. Each dot is one person: ⬤ White ⬤ Black ⬤ Asian ⬤ Hispanic ⬤ Multiracial ⬤ Native American/Other

During the first decade of the 21st century, the city attracted many new residents from the Houston area. Renée C. Lee said that Conroe around 2002 was "a sleepy, backwater town" and that at the time, Conroe city officials needed to use financial incentives to attract home developers to Conroe. Between 2003 and 2006, Conroe became a hotbed of construction of new houses. As a result, Conroe's population grew from 36,811 in 2000 to 56,207 in 2010.

=== Racial and ethnic composition ===
Conroe city, Texas – Racial and ethnic composition Note: the US Census treats Hispanic/Latino as an ethnic category. This table excludes Latinos from the racial categories and assigns them to a separate category. Hispanics/Latinos may be of any race.
Race / Ethnicity (NH = Non-Hispanic)	Pop 2000	Pop 2010	Pop 2020	% 2000	% 2010	% 2020
White alone (NH)	20,060	27,147	45,272	54.49%	48.30%	50.33%
Black or African American alone (NH)	4,015	5,552	8,951	10.91%	9.88%	9.95%
Native American or Alaska Native alone (NH)	82	178	299	0.22%	0.32%	0.33%
Asian alone (NH)	323	988	2,412	0.88%	1.76%	2.68%
Pacific Islander alone (NH)	11	13	85	0.03%	0.02%	0.09%
Some Other Race alone (NH)	32	58	348	0.09%	0.10%	0.39%
Multiracial (NH)	282	610	3,112	0.77%	1.09%	3.46%
Hispanic or Latino (any race)	12,006	21,661	29,477	32.62%	38.54%	32.77%
Total	36,811	56,207	89,956	100.00%	100.00%	100.00%

=== 2020 census ===
As of the 2020 census, Conroe had 89,956 people, 33,556 households, and 21,369 families residing in the city. The median age was 35.1 years; 23.9% of the residents were under 18 and 14.8% were 65 or older. The female/male ratio was 1:0.984 overall and 1:0.966 for 18 and over.

Of the 33,556 households, 33.3% had children under 18 living in them, 46.6% were married-couple households, 18.2% were households with a male householder and no spouse or partner present, 28.2% were households with a female householder and no spouse or partner present. About 27.3% of all households were made up of individuals, and 10.3% had someone living alone who was 65 or older.

Of the city's 36,938 housing units, 9.2% were vacant. Among occupied housing units, 54.4% were owner-occupied and 45.6% were renter-occupied. The homeowner vacancy rate was 2.1% and the rental vacancy rate was 10.8%.

Almost all of the residents lived in urban areas, while 1.9% lived in rural areas.

Racial composition as of the 2020 census
Race	Number	Percentage
White	51,493	57.2%
Black or African American	9,248	10.3%
American Indian and Alaska Native	1,089	1.2%
Asian	2,454	2.7%
Native Hawaiian and other Pacific Islander	109	0.1%
Some other race	13,293	14.8%
Two or more races	12,270	13.6%
Hispanic or Latino (of any race)	29,477	32.8%

=== 2010 census ===
As of the 2010 census, 56,207 people, 18,651 households, and 13,086 families resided in the city.

The racial makeup of the city was 69.7% White (48.3% not including Hispanics), 10.3% African American, 1.2% Native American, 1.8% Asian, 13.7% from other races, and 3.2% from two or more races. Hispanics or Latinos of any race were 38.5% of the population.

=== Population growth ===
Since the 2010 census, Conroe's population has continued to grow. Between 2014 and 2015, Conroe was the sixth-fastest-growing city in the United States.

The following year, the U.S. Census Bureau reported that Conroe was the fastest-growing large city in the United States. It had a 7.8% growth rate between 2015 and 2016. New housing developments throughout the city have contributed to the rapid population growth. Conroe's annexation of growing communities within its extraterritorial jurisdiction has also contributed to its growth.

=== American Community Survey ===
According to the 2016 American Community Survey, the median income for a household in the city was $50,517 and for a family was $60,087. Males had a median income of $44,343 versus $37,747 for females. The per capita income for the city was $28,672. About 12.2% of families and 16.1% of the population were below the poverty line, including 19.4% of those under 18 and 7.6% of those 65 or over. In response to income inequality, several nonprofit groups including the Montgomery County United Way, the Salvation Army, and the Crisis Assistance Center help provide residents of the area with a variety of services ranging from transportation to food and shelter.

== Economy ==
In the early 1980s, Exxon considered consolidating its employees to a site in Conroe. The company ended the plans after the local oil-based economy collapsed.

According to the city's 2025 Annual Comprehensive Financial Report, the top employers in the city are:

#	Employer	# of Employees
1	Conroe Independent School District	9,526
2	Montgomery County	3,453
3	HCA Houston Healthcare Conroe	1,021
4	MS Directional	1,001
5	National Oilwell Varco	976
6	City of Conroe	880
7	Tri-County Behavioral Healthcare	625
8	Wal-Mart Supercenter	567
9	Consolidated Communications	425
10	Keller Williams Advantage Realty	302

== Culture ==
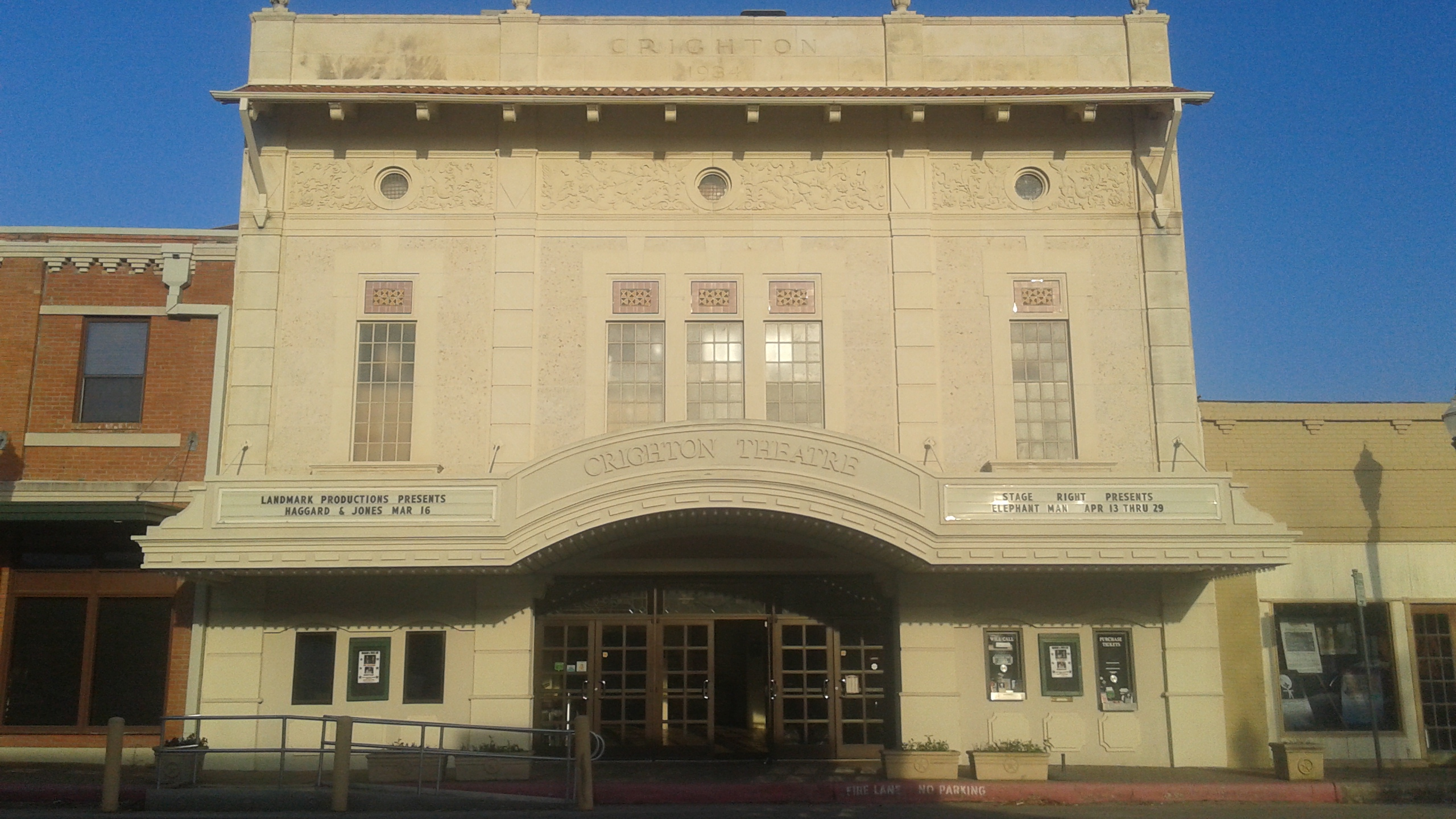
Crighton Theatre, first opened as a movie theatre in 1935, now hosts live theatrical performances.

Downtown Conroe's Central Business District hosts several arts venues. The oldest is the Crighton Theatre, which opened on November 26, 1935. The theatre is named after Harry M. Crighton, Conroe's mayor in 1932-33. The theatre functioned as the community's movie theatre until 1967, when it fell into disrepair. In 1979, it was renovated, and it now hosts live theatrical productions. Another theatre, the Owen Theatre, is also located in the district. The Central Business District has outdoor performance venues at Conroe Founder's Plaza and Heritage Place, which host multiple festivals throughout the year.

The city supports several arts organizations, including the Greater Conroe Arts Alliance. The alliance is a network of arts groups in the city such as the Conroe Symphony, Conroe Art League, and Montgomery County Choral Society. The alliance also sponsors, along with the state of Texas, the Young Texas Artists Music Competition. Founded in 1983, it showcases young musicians who aspire to careers in classical music. In 2009, the city sponsored the Art Bench Project, which converted 13 stone benches scattered throughout the central business district into works of art. Each bench portrays a different part of Conroe's history and culture, from historical figures like George Strake and Charles B. Stewart to contemporary art groups such as the Crighton Players.

=== Parks and recreation ===
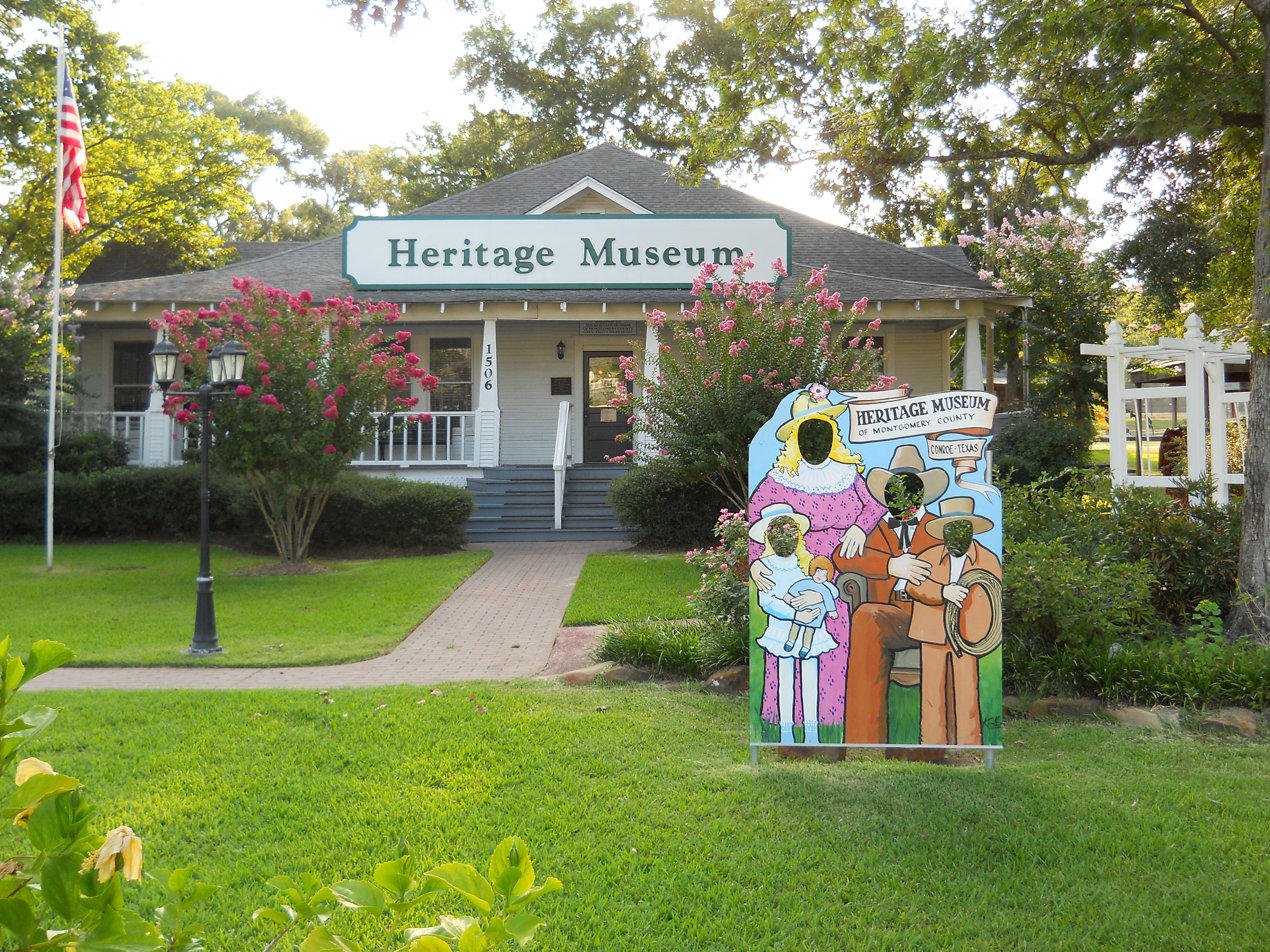
Montgomery County Heritage Museum

The city contains multiple parks which document local history. The Heritage Museum of Montgomery County maintains artifacts of Montgomery County's early settlers.

The Lone Star Monument and Historical Flag Park displays the flags that flew over Texas. The flags are positioned in a circle around the park, with a statue of a Texian in the center. Each flag has a plaque that describes its connection to Texas history. At the park's entrance is a statue of Charles B. Stewart, who is claimed to have designed the Lone Star flag.

Montgomery County War Memorial Park honors the 166 soldiers from Montgomery County who have been killed in active duty. The park's dedication ceremony was in 1976 and featured a speech by President Gerald Ford. In 2017, the Montgomery County Commissioners Court and the City of Conroe agreed to relocate and expand the memorial, to include the names of up to 50,000 soldiers who have lived in Montgomery County. As of June 2019, the expansion is ongoing.

Lake Conroe, northwest of downtown Conroe, is a site for such water-based activities as boating and fishing. The most common fish in the lake are largemouth bass, bluegill, channel catfish, white bass, and hybrid striped bass. Crappie may also be caught in the early spring and fall.

== Government ==
=== Local government ===
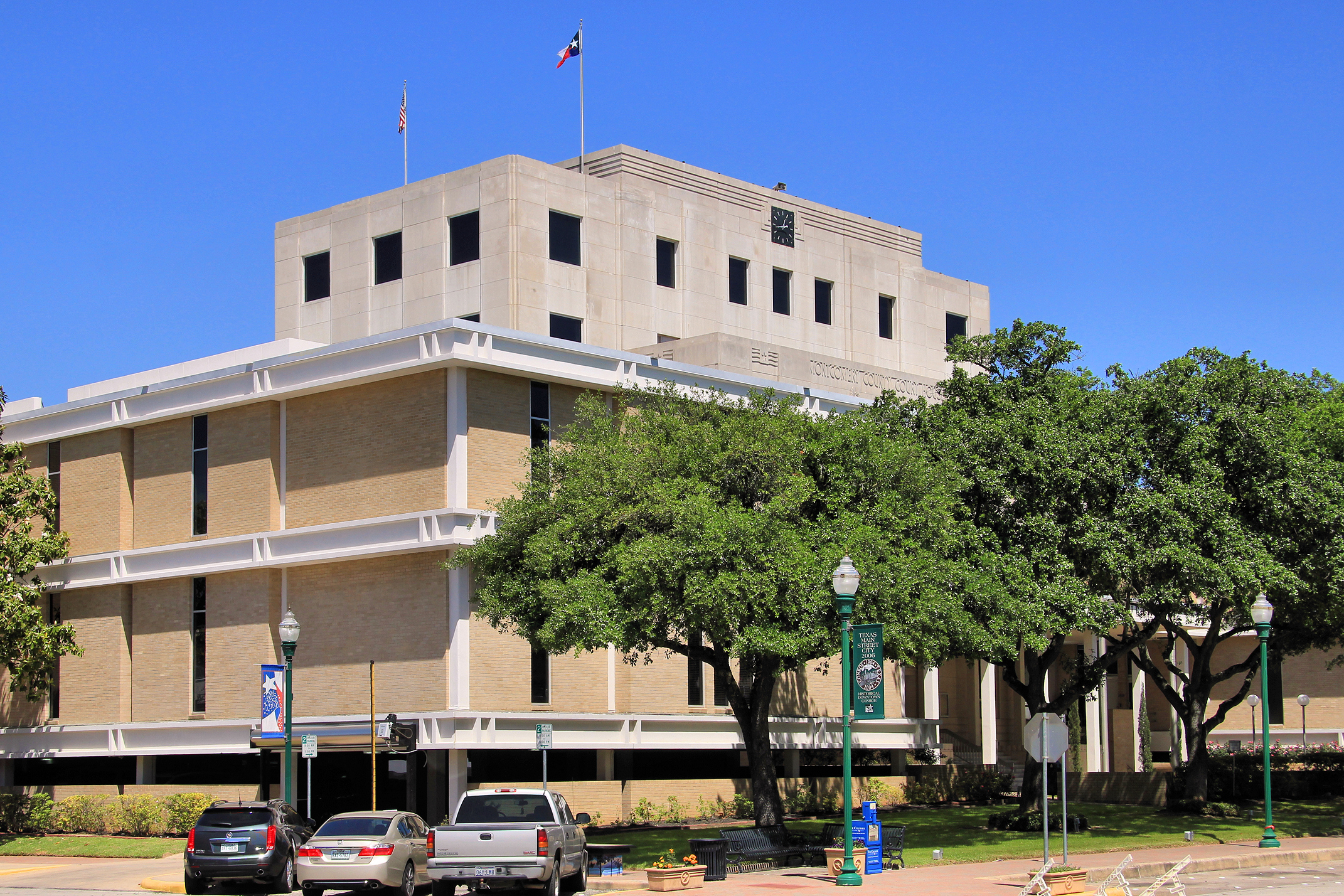
The Montgomery County Courthouse in downtown Conroe.

For the 2019 Fiscal Year, the city had $157.8 million in revenues and $147.9 million in expenditures. The city's net position was $189.7 million.

=== Law enforcement ===
The Conroe Police Department has 142 full-time police officers and 42 support staff. The department has a number of bureaus. The Uniformed Services Bureau includes the Patrol Division, SWAT a part time unit and honor guard. The Support Services Bureau the Criminal Investigations Division and animal control unit.

On 14 September 1982, Sergeant Ed Holcomb was shot and killed while responding to a domestic disturbance call.

In July 2013, Conroe Police Sergeant Jason Blackwelder was off duty, and he observed store employees chasing a shoplifting suspect. He joined the chase. In an isolated area, Blackwelder killed the suspect with a single gunshot to the back of the head. In June 2014, he was convicted of manslaughter. He was sentenced to five years' probation.

=== Animal services ===
The city government maintains its own animal shelter. In 2026 it is scheduled to be renovated. Previously the facility was operated by Care Corp, but in 2024 the city government took direct control. In 2026 the live release rate, in which dogs and cats left the facility alive, was 92.5%, which meant it could be considered a "no-kill shelter".

=== Public libraries ===
The county operates the main branch of the Montgomery County Memorial Library System.

=== State government ===
About 98% of Conroe is represented in the Texas Senate (District 4) by Republican Brandon Creighton. A small portion of the northern part of Conroe is part of District 3, represented by Republican Robert Nichols.

In the Texas House of Representatives, 94% of Conroe is part of District 16, represented by Republican Will Metcalf. The southern portion of Conroe is in District 15, represented by Republican Steve Toth. Less than 1% of Conroe residents are part of District 3, represented by Republican Cecil Bell Jr.

The Texas Department of Criminal Justice operates the Conroe District Parole Office in Conroe.

=== Federal government ===
At the Federal level, the two U.S. senators from Texas are Republicans John Cornyn and Ted Cruz. Conroe is part of Texas's 8th congressional district, which is represented by Republican Morgan Luttrell.

The United States Postal Service Conroe Post Office is located at 809 West Dallas Street.

== Education ==
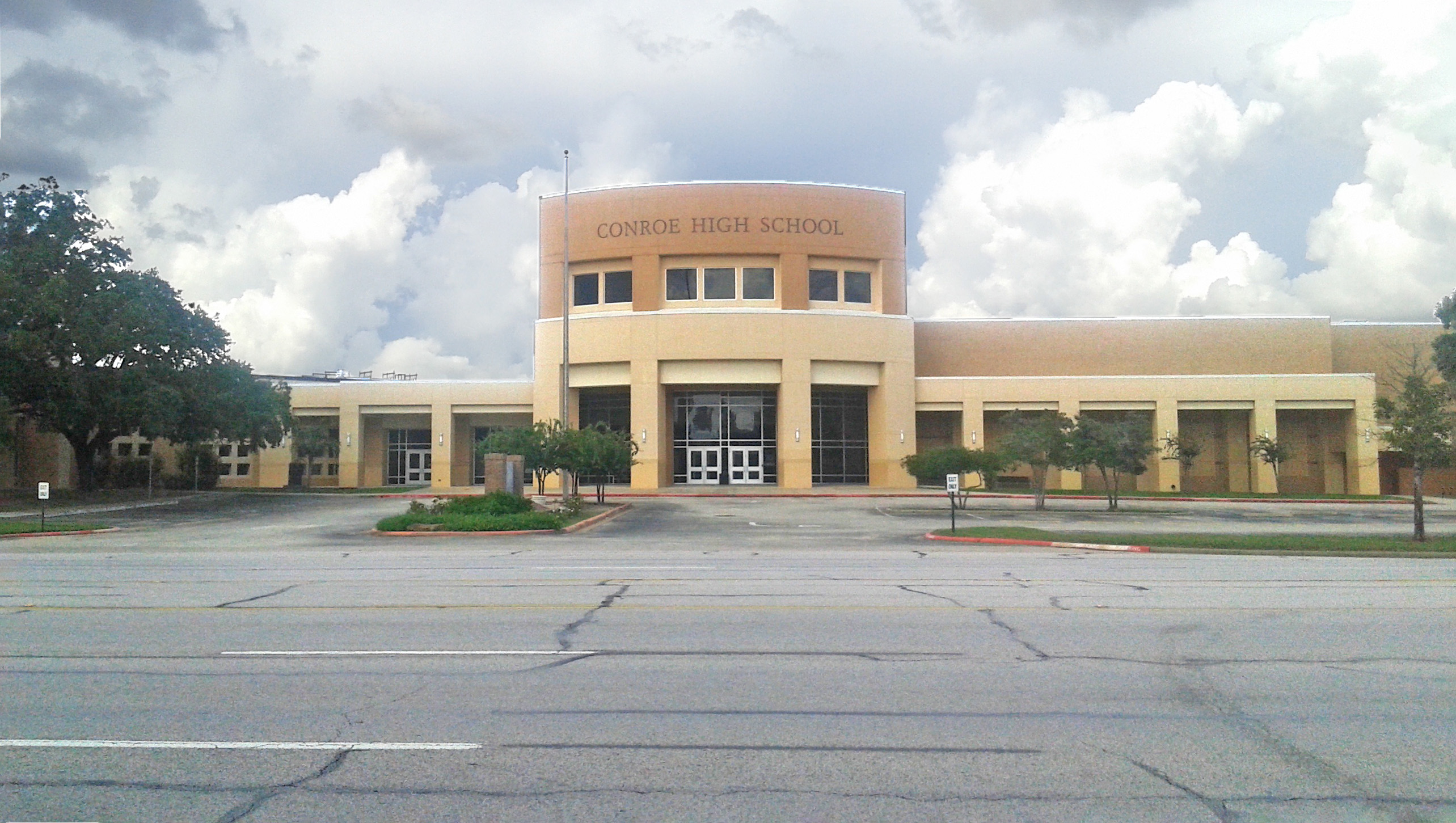
Conroe High School, Conroe Independent School District.

=== Colleges and universities ===
Residents of both Conroe ISD and Willis ISD (and therefore the whole city of Conroe) are served by the Lone Star College System (formerly North Harris Montgomery Community College).

It is primarily served by the Lone Star College-Montgomery Campus and LSC University Center. Other campuses in the county include the EMCID Center in New Caney, and the Conroe Center. The territory in Conroe ISD joined the community college district in 1991, and the territory in Willis ISD joined the district in 1996.

The Catholic University of St. Thomas opened a campus in Conroe in fall 2020. The Old Conroe Police building has been adapted to serve as a temporary site for up to three years. The permanent campus is proposed to be at Deison Technology Park. Class of 1952 alumnus Vincent D'Amico offered the university 50 acres (20 ha) of land in east Montgomery County for the project.

=== Public school districts ===
Almost all areas of Conroe are within the Conroe Independent School District though a small northern section of Conroe is within the Willis Independent School District, and a western section is in the Montgomery Independent School District.

==== Conroe Independent School District ====
All of the schools listed here are in the city of Conroe. Approximately 60% of the Conroe ISD section of Conroe is zoned to Conroe High School though some parts of Conroe attend Oak Ridge High School and Caney Creek High School.

The junior high schools that serve the Conroe High School feeder zone are:

- John V. Peet Junior High School
- Stockton Junior High School
- Albert B. Moorhead Junior High School

Some intermediate schools that serve the Conroe High School feeder zone are:

- Cryar Intermediate School
- Travis Intermediate School
- Bozman Intermediate School

Some elementary schools that serve the Conroe High School feeder zone are:

- Anderson Elementary School
- Neil Armstrong Elementary School
- Giesinger Elementary School
- Sam Houston Elementary School
- O. A. Reaves Elementary School
- B. B. Rice Elementary School
- J. W. Runyan Elementary School
- Wilkinson Elementary School

==== Willis Independent School District ====
The Willis ISD section is zoned to Turner Elementary School, Brabham Middle School, and Willis High School. Turner Elementary and Willis High are in the Conroe city limits. Brabham is adjacent to the Conroe city limits.

=== Private schools ===
- Sacred Heart Catholic School – Roman Catholic Archdiocese of Galveston-Houston
- Covenant Christian School
- Lifestyle Christian School
- Montgomery Christian Academy

The closest Catholic high school is Frassati Catholic High School in north Harris County; Conroe is in the school's intended catchment area.

== Media ==
The Courier is a daily newspaper published in Conroe, Texas, covering Montgomery County. In 2016, the newspaper was purchased by Hearst Communications, a media conglomerate which also owns and operates the Houston Chronicle.

Two Houston television stations, Ion owned-and-operated KPXB-TV (channel 49) and Quest owned-and-operated KTBU (channel 55), are licensed to Conroe. Both stations operate from studios located in the city of Houston.

Two low-power FM radio stations, KZCW-LP (104.5 FM) and KZCC-LP (106.1 FM), are owned by the city. The stations were purchased for emergency broadcasts during natural and civil emergencies, but air local and regional content when these are not a threat. Content is usually simulcast on the city's official cable television channel 12 "Our City TV" on the Consolidated and Optimum providers.

== Infrastructure ==
=== Transportation ===
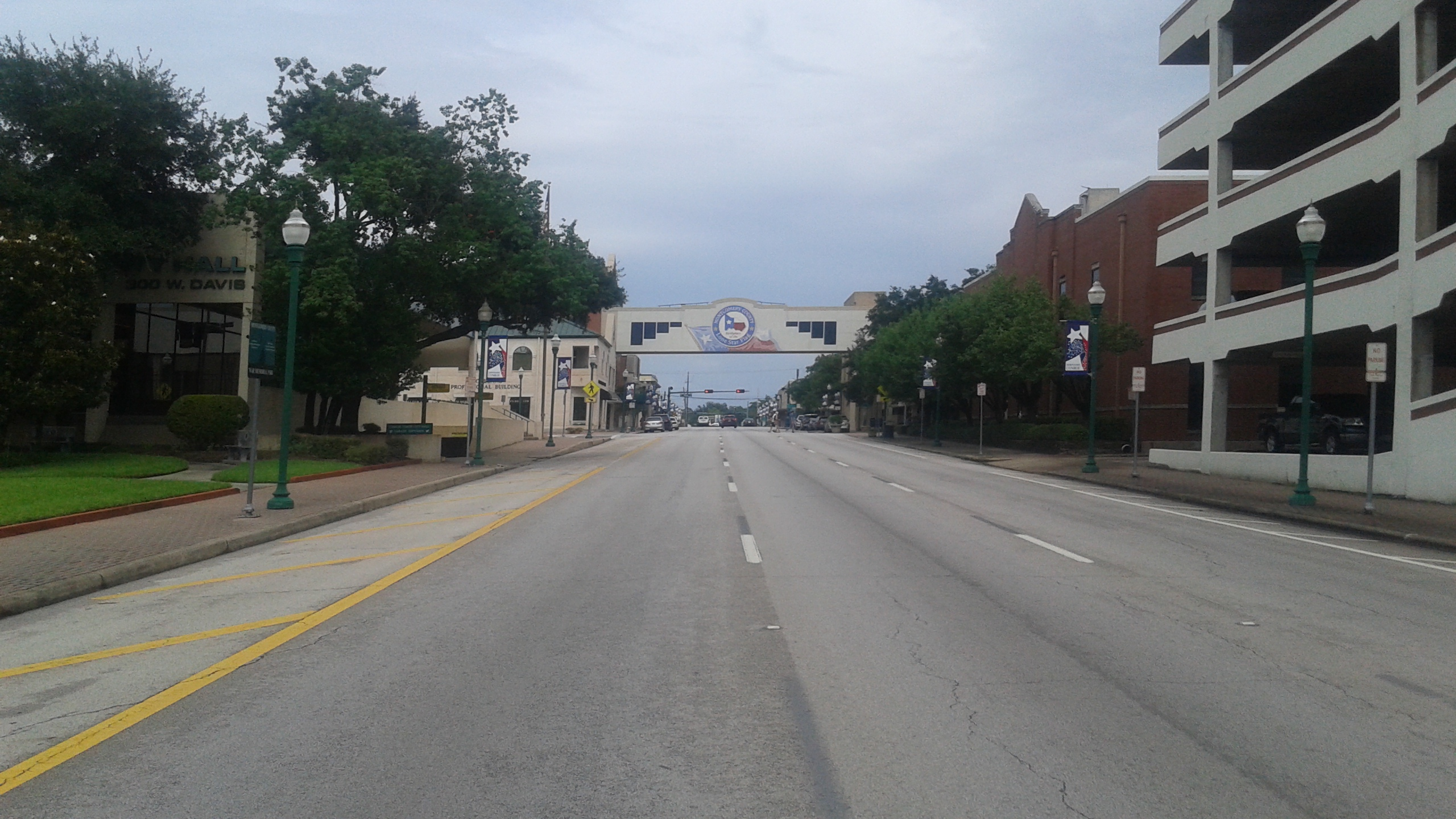
View of Texas State Highway 105 in downtown Conroe. The archway connects the Montgomery County Courthouse (right) with the Montgomery County Court Annex.

In 2012 the U.S. Census Bureau classified the area around Conroe and The Woodlands as a "large urbanized transit area." This is defined as an area having more than 200,000 residents, which makes it eligible to receive federal transportation funds, particularly to support transit.

- Interstate 45 directly connects the city with Houston to its south (40 miles) and with Dallas to its northwest (200 miles).
- Texas Highway 105 connects the city of Cleveland to the east and town of Montgomery to the west.
- Texas Loop 336 circles the city of Conroe.
- Conroe-North Houston Regional Airport provides general aviation services to Conroe.
- Greyhound Bus Lines operate a small station.
- Metropolitan Transit Authority of Harris County, Texas (291 Conroe Park & Ride) provide service to Downtown Houston.
- The City of Conroe launched a local bus service, Conroe Connection, in 2015. It runs Monday through Friday, from 7:00 am to 7:00 pm
- Burlington Northern Santa Fe Railway BNSF Railway operates the busy Conroe subdivision, an east–west railroad main line that runs from Silsbee in Hardin County to Navasota in Grimes County. There it intersects a main line running between Fort Worth and Galveston.

Union Pacific Railroad Corporation operates another busy main line that runs north from Houston in Harris County to Palestine in Anderson County, known as the Palestine subdivision. The two railroads intersect at a diamond in downtown Conroe between Main and First Streets.

=== Healthcare ===
In the early 1920s the Mary Swain Sanitarium, was established as the first organized healthcare institution in the city. The Mary Swain Sanitarium was private.

In 1938 the Montgomery County Hospital, a public institution, replaced it. It had 25 beds. The hospital closed after a new hospital of the Montgomery County Hospital District opened in 1982.

== Notable people ==
- Brandon Allen, former Major League Baseball player for Arizona Diamondbacks
- Brian Barkley, former pitcher for Boston Red Sox
- Kyle Bennett, professional BMX racer
- Richard Bradford, motion picture and television actor, notable leading roles in Man in the Suitcase, The Untouchables and Trip to Bountiful
- Clarence Lee Brandley, exonerated prisoner
- Jeromy Burnitz, Conroe High School 1987, baseball player drafted by New York Mets in 1990; played for seven major league teams over a fourteen-year career
- Rock Cartwright, NFL running back, San Francisco 49ers
- Andrew Cashner, Conroe High School 2005, drafted by Chicago Cubs, pitcher for Texas Rangers
- Jonathan Daviss, leading role in the Netflix series Outer Banks
- Colin Edwards, two-time World Superbike champion and former MotoGP rider
- Annette Gordon-Reed, historian and law professor at Harvard University, MacArthur fellow and winner of the Pulitzer Prize for History and the National Book Award for Nonfiction
- John Hambrick, broadcast journalist, reporter, actor, voice-over announcer, and TV documentary producer
- Matt Lepsis, former National Football League player for the Denver Broncos and Super Bowl XXXIII winner
- Parker McCollum, Texas Country musician
- John Monroe, infielder in Major League Baseball for the New York Giants and Philadelphia Phillies
- David M. Parsons, 2011 Texas State Poet Laureate
- Kevin Slowey, starting pitcher for MLB's Minnesota Twins
- Grant Stuard, NFL player and 2021 Mr. Irrelevant
- Roger Vick, former NFL fullback
