= D. D. Terry =

American football player (born 1984)

No. 35
- Position: Running back

Personal information
- Born: September 9, 1984 (age 42); Willis, Texas, U.S.
- Listed height: 6 ft 1 in (1.85 m)
- Listed weight: 190 lb (86 kg)

Career information
- College: Sam Houston
- NFL draft: 2007: undrafted

Career history
- Jacksonville Jaguars (2007–2008)*; Houston Texans (2008)*; Omaha Nighthawks (2010)*
- * Offseason or practice squad member only

D. D. Terry (born February 16, 1984) is an American former football running back. He was signed by the Jacksonville Jaguars as an undrafted free agent in 2007. He played college football at Sam Houston.

Terry was also a member of the Houston Texans and Omaha Nighthawks.

== Early life ==
Terry attended Willis High School in Willis, Texas and lettered in football, basketball, and track. In football, he was an All-District linebacker. He graduated from Willis High School in 2002.

== College career ==
Terry attended Kilgore Junior College for a year in 2003 and was a student and a letterman in football. In football, he cracked the starting lineup as a defensive back. He started for 2 yrs at RB. For Sam Houston State. He broke multiple school records while running for over 1,000 yards both seasons.

== Professional career ==
=== Jacksonville Jaguars ===
Terry went undrafted in the 2007 NFL draft. He was later signed by the Jacksonville Jaguars in May 2007. He spent the entire 2007 season on the Jaguars practice squad. On June 11, 2008, Terry was released by the Jaguars.

=== Houston Texans ===
On September 24, 2008, Terry was signed to the practice squad of the Houston Texans after the team released running back Arliss Beach. Terry was released on October 8 when the team signed running back Ryan Moats to its practice squad. Team re-signed Terry to the practice squad on October 29. He was released again on November 5.
