= San Jacinto River (Texas) =

River in Texas, United States

Coordinates: 29°32′49″N 94°56′53″W

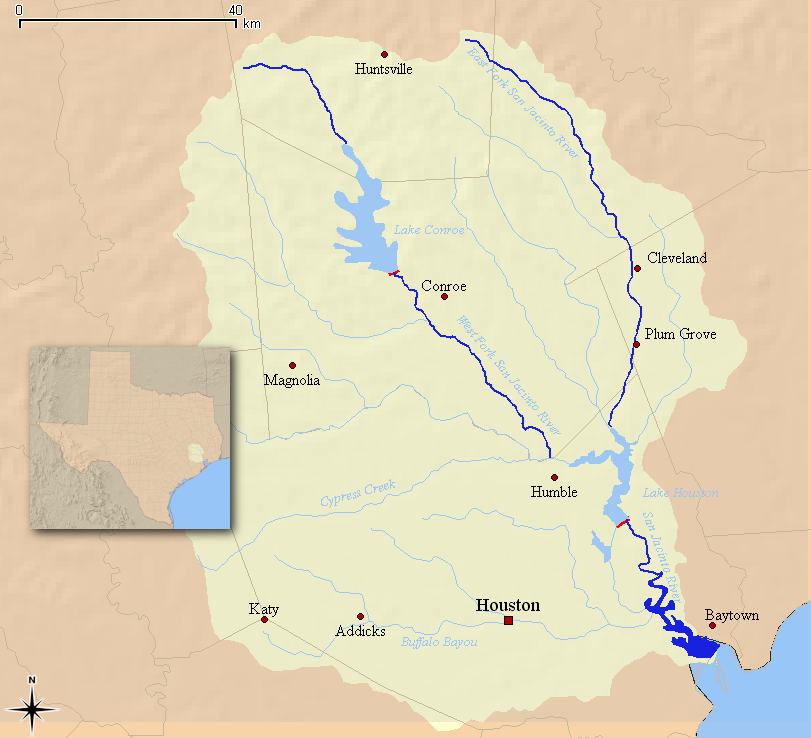
Map of the San Jacinto River and associated watershed

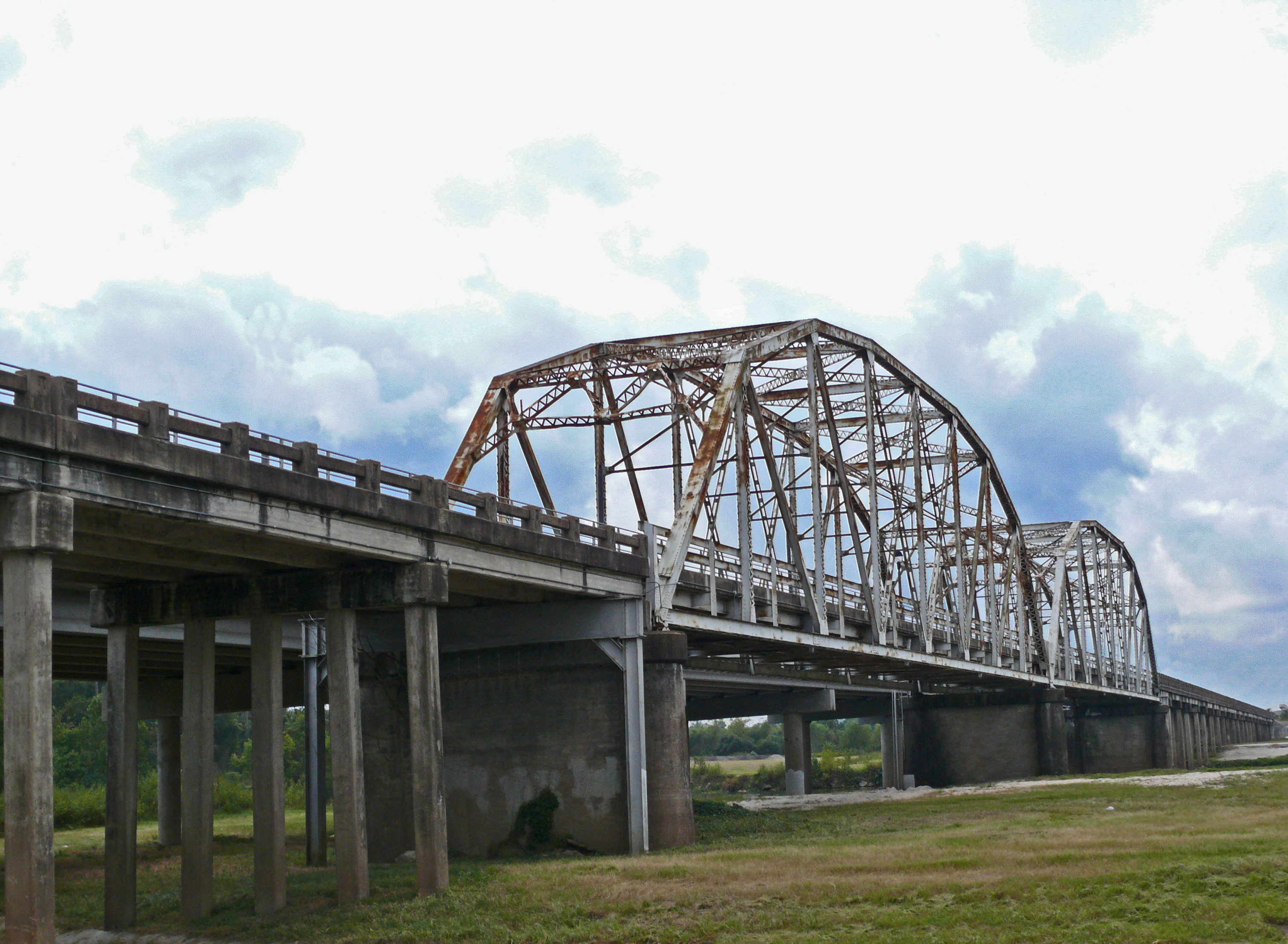
Old San Jacinto River Truss Bridge -- Humble, Texas

The San Jacinto River (/ˌsæn dʒəˈsɪntoʊ/ SAN jə-SIN-toh, Spanish pronunciation: [ˈri.o ˈsaŋ xaˈsinto]) is a body of water that flows through southeast Texas. The name also originates from Saint Hyacinth, a Polish Dominican friar and missionary. In the past, it was home to the Karankawa and Akokisa tribes.

The river begins with a west and east fork; the west fork begins in Walker County, to the west of Huntsville, and flows southeast through Montgomery County, where it is dammed to create Lake Conroe. The east fork begins in San Jacinto County, a few miles west of Lake Livingston, then flows south through Cleveland. The confluence of the west and east forks occurs in northeast Harris County, where the river is dammed to create Lake Houston. Continuing southward, the river merges with Buffalo Bayou before the mouth of Galveston Bay, forming part of the Houston Ship Channel.

== Historical Influence ==
The Battle of San Jacinto was fought at and along the confluence of where the rain-swollen Buffalo Bayou and the San Jacinto River meet in what is now Harris County during the Texas Revolution in 1836. The decisive victory gave rise to the Republic of Texas. The site is now a historic state park known as the San Jacinto Battleground State Historic Site. The park is also the site of the San Jacinto Monument.

== Natural Disasters and Flooding ==
=== 1994 Pipeline Explosion ===
In October 1994, flooding along the San Jacinto River led to the failure of eight petroleum-products pipelines, and the undermining of a number of other pipelines. The escaping products were ignited, leading to smoke inhalation and/or burn injuries of 547 people.

=== Hurricane Harvey ===
In 2017, flooding related to Hurricane Harvey damaged the protective barrier at the San Jacinto River Waste Pits site, releasing dioxins into the river. The EPA ordered International Paper and McGinnis Industrial Maintenance Corp to pay $115 million to clean up the contaminated site. Additionally, the downpour of Hurricane Harvey caused cancerous industrial chemicals and substances to flow down the San Jacinto River after being released from heavily contaminated industries along the river.

== Historical Timeline ==
- 1836: The Battle of San Jacinto is fought at the confluence of Buffalo Bayou and the San Jacinto River.
- 1907: The San Jacinto Battleground State Park opens as the first state park in Texas
- 1960: The San Jacinto Battleground State Historic Site is added as a National Historic Landmark.
- 1994: Pipeline failures and explosions caused by the October 1994 flooding of the San Jacinto River.
- 2008: The U.S. Environmental Protection Agency adds the San Jacinto River waste pits to the federal superfund cleanup list.
- 2017: Hurricane Harvey causes flooding and damages the protective barrier of the San Jacinto River Waste Pits releasing dioxins into the river.

== See also ==
- List of rivers of Texas
