= Coulam =

Coulam is a surname. Notable people with the surname include:

- Daisy Coulam (fl. 2007–2020), British television producer and screenwriter
- George Coulam (1937–2025), American business owner
- Roger Coulam (1940–2005), British keyboard session musician
