= Pinebrook, Texas =

- Census-designated place
- Location within Texas Location within the United States
- Coordinates: 30°18′33″N 95°52′34″W
- Country: United States
- State: Texas
- County: Grimes

Area
  - Total: 2.76 sq mi (7.16 km^{2})
  - Land: 2.75 sq mi (7.11 km^{2})
  - Water: 0.019 sq mi (0.05 km^{2})
- Elevation: 338 ft (103 m)
- Time zone: UTC-6 (Central (CST))
  - Summer (DST): UTC-5 (CDT)
- ZIP Code: 77363 (Plantersville)
- Area code: 936
- FIPS code: 48-57494
- GNIS feature ID: 2805781

Pinebrook is an unincorporated community and census-designated place (CDP) in Grimes County, Texas, United States. As of the 2020 census, Pinebrook had a population of 485. It was first listed as a CDP prior to the 2020 census.

The CDP is in the southeastern part of the county, 2 miles (3 km) southwest of Plantersville and 17 miles (27 km) southeast of Navasota. An extension of the Aggie Expressway (Texas State Highway 249) is slated to pass just south of the community. The highway leads southeast 40 miles (64 km) to Interstate 45 at Aldine, north of Houston.

== Demographics ==
Historical population
Census	Pop.	Note	%±
2020	485		—
U.S. Decennial Census; 1850–1900 1910; 1920 1930 1940; 1950 1960 1970; 1980 1990 2000; 2010 2020

Pinebrook first appeared as a census designated place in the 2020 U.S. census.

=== 2020 census ===
Pinebrook CDP, Texas – Racial and ethnic composition Note: the US Census treats Hispanic/Latino as an ethnic category. This table excludes Latinos from the racial categories and assigns them to a separate category. Hispanics/Latinos may be of any race.
Race / Ethnicity (NH = Non-Hispanic)	Pop 2020	% 2020
White alone (NH)	206	42.47%
Black or African American alone (NH)	5	1.03%
Native American or Alaska Native alone (NH)	1	0.21%
Asian alone (NH)	0	0.00%
Native Hawaiian or Pacific Islander alone (NH)	0	0.00%
Other race alone (NH)	1	0.21%
Mixed race or Multiracial (NH)	29	5.98%
Hispanic or Latino (any race)	243	50.10%
Total	485	100.00%

== Education ==
It is within Navasota Independent School District, which operates Navasota High School.
