= Plantersville, Texas =

- City
- Plantersville located within Grimes County.
- Coordinates: 30°19′59″N 95°51′47″W
- country: United States
- state: Texas
- county: Grimes

Area
  - Total: 1.99 sq mi (5.15 km^{2})
  - Land: 1.98 sq mi (5.12 km^{2})
  - Water: 0.012 sq mi (0.03 km^{2})
- Elevation: 354 ft (108 m)

Population (2020)
  - Total: 464
  - Density: 235/sq mi (90.6/km^{2})
- Time zone: UTC-6 (Central (CST))
  - Summer (DST): UTC-5 (CDT)
- Postal code: 77363
- Area code: 936
- FIPS code: 48-58040
- GNIS feature ID: 2791463
- Website: https://cityofplantersville.net/

Plantersville is a city in Grimes County, Texas, United States. It was incorporated as a city on May 15, 2017. It is located at the junction of Texas State Highway 105, Farm to Market Road 1774, and the Atchison, Topeka and Santa Fe Railway in the southeastern part of the county. It is adjacent to the city of Todd Mission. As of the 2020 census, its population was 464.

== Demographics ==
Historical population
| Census | Pop. | Note | %± |
|---|---|---|---|
| 2020 | 464 | | — |
2020 Census

=== 2020 census ===
As of the 2020 census, Plantersville had a population of 464. The median age was 42.1 years. 24.4% of residents were under the age of 18 and 20.3% of residents were 65 years of age or older. For every 100 females there were 102.6 males, and for every 100 females age 18 and over there were 92.9 males age 18 and over.

0.0% of residents lived in urban areas, while 100.0% lived in rural areas.

There were 190 households in Plantersville, of which 31.6% had children under the age of 18 living in them. Of all households, 46.8% were married-couple households, 23.2% were households with a male householder and no spouse or partner present, and 26.8% were households with a female householder and no spouse or partner present. About 25.8% of all households were made up of individuals and 13.1% had someone living alone who was 65 years of age or older.

There were 228 housing units, of which 16.7% were vacant. The homeowner vacancy rate was 0.6% and the rental vacancy rate was 17.6%.

Racial composition as of the 2020 census
| Race | Number | Percent |
|---|---|---|
| White | 335 | 72.2% |
| Black or African American | 37 | 8.0% |
| American Indian and Alaska Native | 2 | 0.4% |
| Asian | 1 | 0.2% |
| Native Hawaiian and Other Pacific Islander | 0 | 0.0% |
| Some other race | 36 | 7.8% |
| Two or more races | 53 | 11.4% |
| Hispanic or Latino (of any race) | 82 | 17.7% |

== Education ==
Public education in the Plantersville area is provided by the Navasota Independent School District. Navasota High School is its comprehensive high school.

== Economy ==
Since 1974, Plantersville has been home to the Texas Renaissance Festival, an annual event that attracts hundreds of thousands of visitors each year. Over 644,000 visitors were recorded in 2017.
