= Quinton Spears =

American football player (born 1988)

No. 90
- Position: Linebacker

Personal information
- Born: May 11, 1988 (age 38); Huntsville, Texas, U.S.
- Listed height: 6 ft 4 in (1.93 m)
- Listed weight: 235 lb (107 kg)

Career information
- High school: Montgomery (Montgomery, Texas)
- College: Prairie View A&M
- NFL draft: 2011: undrafted

Career history
- Miami Dolphins (2011)*; Cleveland Browns (2011); Indianapolis Colts (2013); Dallas Cowboys (2014)*
- * Offseason or practice squad member only

Career NFL statistics
- Total tackles: 8
- Stats at Pro Football Reference

Quinton Spears (born May 11, 1988) is an American former professional football player who was a linebacker in the National Football League (NFL). He played college football for the Prairie View A&M Panthers.

== Early life ==
Spears was a three-year-letter wide receiver at Montgomery High School in Montgomery, Texas, and received a scholarship to Prairie View A&M University where he was switched to tight end and finally defensive line. While at Prairie View A&M, Spears was a unanimous preseason All-SWAC first-team selection as a defensive end in 2009.

== Professional career ==
=== Cleveland Browns ===
Spears was claimed by Cleveland Browns off waivers from Miami Dolphins and moved from defensive end to linebacker on September 4, 2011.

=== Indianapolis Colts ===
Spears signed a reserve/futures contract with the Indianapolis Colts on December 31, 2012. On August 13, 2013, he was waived-injured by the Colts. On the next day, he cleared waivers and was placed on the Colts' injured reserve list. On September 10, 2013 the Indianapolis Colts waived linebacker Quinton Spears (hamstring) from injured reserve.

=== Dallas Cowboys ===
The Dallas Cowboys signed Spears to a futures contract on January 8, 2014. On May 12, 2014 the Dallas Cowboys released Quinton Spears.
