= Montgomery Elementary School =

Montgomery Elementary School may refer to:

- Montgomery Elementary School - Cazadero, California - Montgomery Elementary School District
- Montgomery Elementary School - Montgomery, New York - Valley Central School District
- Montgomery Elementary School - North Wales, Pennsylvania - North Penn School District
- Montgomery Elementary School - Montgomery, Texas - Montgomery Independent School District
- Montgomery School - Chester Springs, Pennsylvania
