= Charles Bellinger Stewart =

Texas politician (1806–1885)

- Born: February 6, 1806; Charleston, South Carolina
- Died: July 1, 1885 (aged 79); Montgomery, Texas
- Monuments: Bust in Conroe, Texas, erected 2011
- Other name: CB Stewart
- Occupations: Pharmacist, doctor, politician
- Known for: Texas Declaration of Independence

Charles Bellinger Tate Stewart (February 6, 1806 – July 1, 1885) was an American-born pharmacist, medical doctor, and political leader in the Republic of Texas. He died in 1885 at 79 years old.

== Early life ==
Stewart was born in Charleston, South Carolina, but moved to Texas in 1830. He was a delegate from the Municipality of Austin to the Convention of 1836, where he signed the Texas Declaration of Independence from Mexico. He was a member of the committee that drafted the Constitution of the Republic of Texas. On March 8, 1836, two days after the Alamo fell, Stewart absented himself from the Convention for a few days to get married. On March 11, 1836, he married Julia Shepperd in the Lake Creek Settlement. Stewart returned to the Convention on March 16, 1836, and signed the Constitution of the Republic of Texas on March 17, 1836. He moved to Montgomery, Texas, in 1837 and later attended the state constitutional convention of 1845. He represented Montgomery County in the Texas House of Representatives.

== Texas State Flag and Seal ==
Some have claimed that Stewart is either the designer of the Texas flag or drew the image used by the Third Congress when enacting the legislation adopting the flag. "Accompanying the original Act ... is a drawing by Peter Krag of the national flag and seal ... although in the original President Lamar's approval and signature are at the top and upside down[.]" However, Stewart's drawing "looks suspiciously like a tracing of the Peter Krag art, including the upside down signature of President Lamar."

On April 21, 2011, a bust of Charles B. Stewart was unveiled at the ceremony dedicating the Lone Star Monument and Historical Flag Park in Conroe, Montgomery County, Texas.
