= George Washington Carver High School (Navasota, Texas) =

Coordinates: 30.3756°N 96.0818°W

- 1602 South LaSalle; Navasota, Texas; U.S.

Information
- Former name: Navasota Colored School
- Type: Public

George Washington Carver High School was a public secondary school in Navasota, Texas. It served as the high school for black students beginning around 1870 and ending in 1968, when the schools were integrated. In 2008 the buildings were repurposed as the Carver Community Center and are owned by the Navasota George Washington Carver Alumni Association.

== History ==
In 1870, hotelier Ira Malcom Camp donated property for a one-room school house for African-American children, which was built in 1875. In 1895, J.J. Reinhardt founded the Navasota Colored School on the same location. The last class graduated in 1968, The school burned in 1910. In 1928 a new structure was built near the fire station. In 1942, several buildings were added and the school was rechristened George Washington Carver High School, and the older building were then used for the elementary aged students. In 1968, when federally mandated integration required the district to merge with the Navasota Independent School District and the students were rezoned to attend Navasota High School. Carver High housed 7th and 8th grade students until the mid 1970s. In 2008 they became the George Washington Carver Community Center.

In 2018 the Texas Historical Association commemorated the school with a historical marker.
