= Navasota Independent School District =

School district in Texas, United States

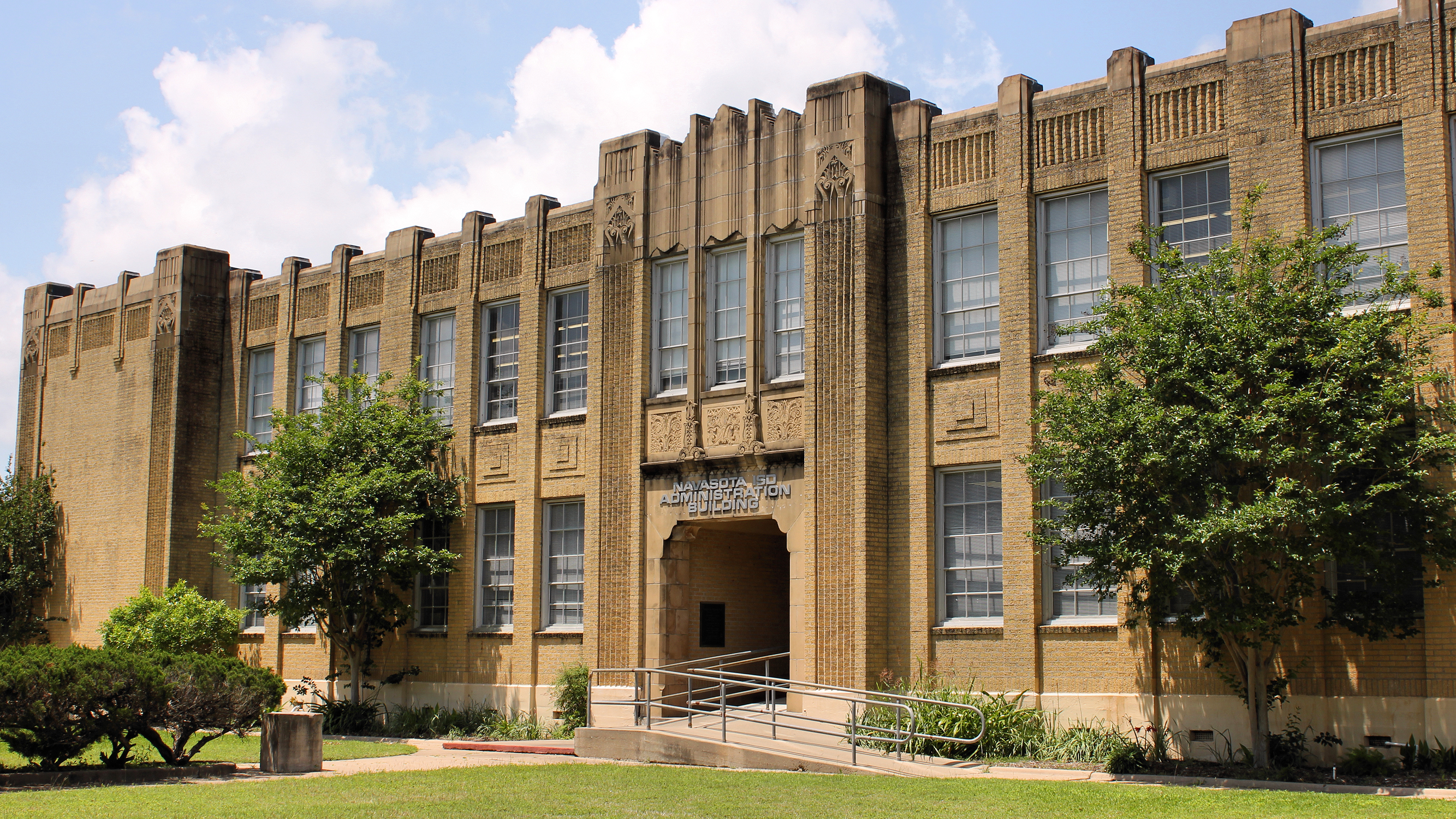
- The Navasota ISD administration offices are located in the former high school.

Address
- 705 East Washington Avenue Navasota, Texas, 77868; United States

District information
- Type: Public
- Grades: PK–12
- Schools: 6
- NCES District ID: 4832190

Students and staff
- Students: 3,030 (2023–2024)
- Teachers: 215.57 (on an FTE basis) (2023–2024)
- Staff: 184.54 (on an FTE basis) (2023–2024)
- Student–teacher ratio: 14.06 (2023–2024)

Other information
- Website: www.navasotaisd.org

Navasota Independent School District is a public school district based in Navasota, Texas (USA) that enrolls approximately 3,000 students.

The district encompasses 362.35 square miles (938.5 km^{2}), in southern Grimes and Brazos counties. In Grimes County it includes the City of Navasota along with Pinebrook, Plantersville and Todd Mission. In Brazos County it includes Millican. It also includes the rural communities of Courtney, White Hall, and Stoneham.

Navasota ISD ranks as the 181st largest land encompassing district of the 1,033 Texas independent school districts.

In 2017, the school district and all campuses were rated "met standard" by the Texas Education Agency.

== Schools ==
- Navasota High School (Grades 9-12)
- Navasota Junior High School (Grades 6-8)
- Brule Elementary School (Grades PK-5)
- John C. Webb Elementary School (Grades PK-5)
- High Point Elementary School (Grades PK-5) - Stoneham
- W. B. Bizzell Academy (Academic Alternative Campus Grades 9-12)

== History ==
The first Navasota School Board meeting of record was held in May, 1899.

The first Navasota school building, the Atcheson School, was located on Washington Avenue across from the present day medical center; the only remaining remnants of this building are the entrance steps.

In 1928, a school building was constructed at LaSalle Street and Spur 515, for the purpose of educating African-American students within the Navasota area. This campus is at the current location of the Carver Learning Center, and was transferred to the Carver Alumni Association in 2007.

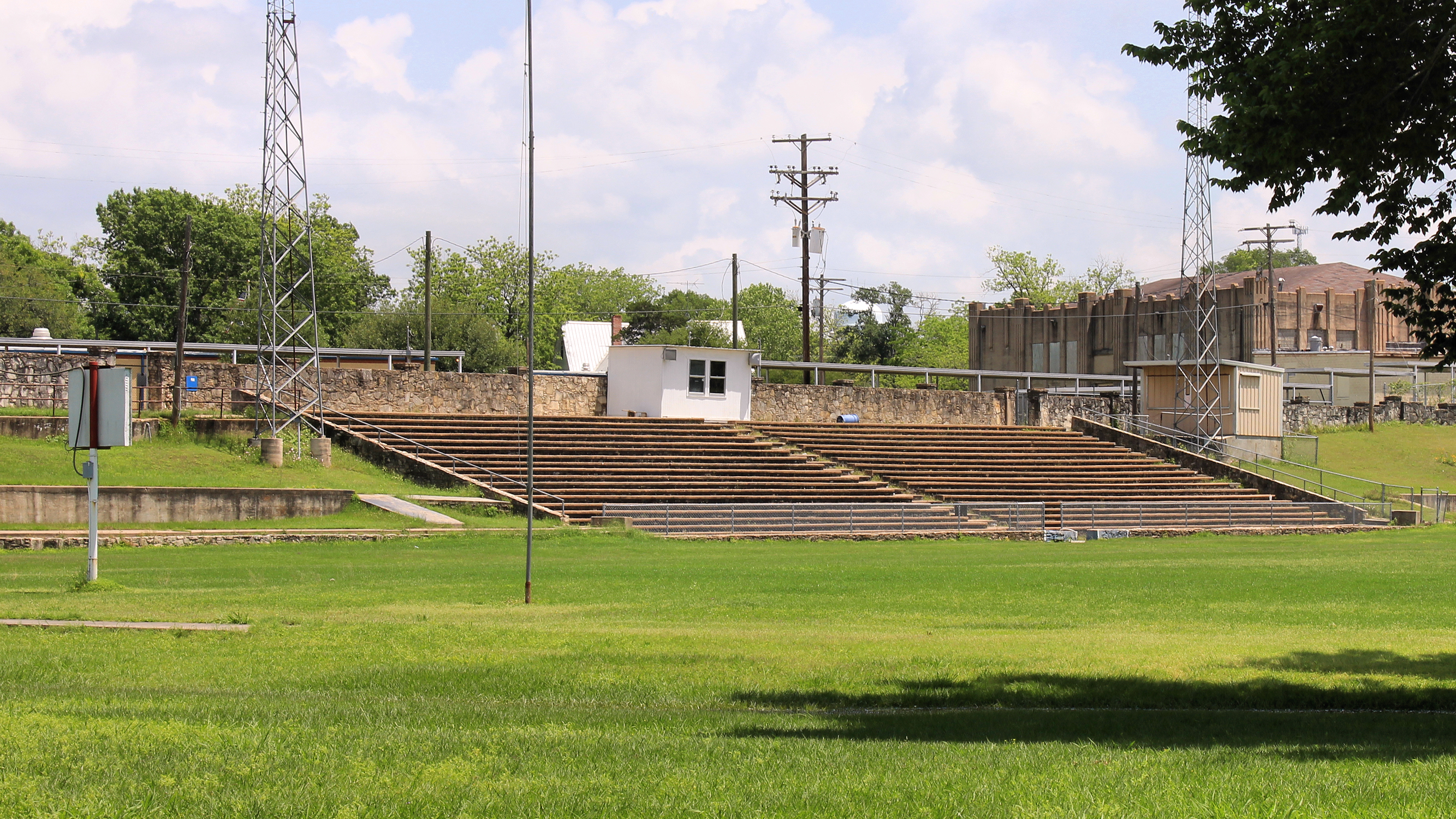
Brule Field with the old gym in the background.

In May 1930, a new High School was completed; the building presently serves as the district’s administrative offices. The school included an indoor gymnasium (current location of the Superintendent's office and District Board Room), a balcony area allowed viewing of games from the second story.

In 1934, a new gym and a football stadium were completed, at Navasota High School, with the aid of the Works Progress Administration. The stadium was named Brule Field in honor of its architect, R.J. Brule, and was used through the end of the 2006 football season.

During the 1934-1935 school year the Navasota school colors were changed from orange and black to blue and white.

1940 the LaSalle Street campus was named George Washington Carver School.

At the beginning of the 1941 school year, three small common school districts (CSD) that served elementary level students in Piedmont, Harmony and Yarboro, each with less than 150 students, incorporated within the Navasota municipal school system.

In October 1947, Navasota became an independent school district (ISD) by divorcement election from the city. By June 1948 construction of a new elementary began, at the site of the current intermediate school, following completion the Atcheson school building was demolished. At the same time Stewart Field (current location of the NISD Bus Barn) and a gymnasium was constructed for the Carver High School athletic programs.

The first Navasota Jr. High School Fang football game was played during the 1950 football season.

In 1951, Courtney-Lynn Grove-White Hall (CLW) CSD, Stoneham CSD (including High Point and Grimes Prairie School), Victory CSD and Plantersville ISD (including Todd Mission School) were either annexed or consolidated within Navasota ISD. By June of the same year, contracts were awarded to begin construction of the district's auditorium on Brosig Avenue, and an addition to the elementary school (current location of a covered walkway between Brule Field and the back entrance of the intermediate school).

In April 1953 the Allenfarm-Millican-Terrell (AMT) Common School District of Brazos County was annexed within Navasota ISD. This annexation added approximately 77 square miles (200 km^{2}) of Brazos County into the school district.

Navasota Carver High School's Wildcats won the state basketball championship in 1958, defeating Amarillo Carver 66-58.

By 1964 a Freedom of Choice plan for Navasota ISD was put into effect, with the goal of ending racially segregated schools. The first day of the 1964-1965 school year, grades 1-3 were included in this plan. The next year grades 4-6 would fall under the plan. The 1966-1967 school year saw grades 7-9 integrated and finally grades 10-12 were added in 1967-1968.

In the 1968-1969 school year, segregation ended within Navasota ISD, upon the completion of the integration of Carver High School within Navasota High School; this school year also witnessed the opening of Navasota Elementary School on Neal Street for kindergarten to 5th grade. Grades 7th and 8th were housed at the Carver campus until completion of the new Navasota High School in the mid-1970s.

January 1976 students literally "picked up-their desk" and moved from the antiquated "two-story" building near downtown to the new Navasota High School. Grades 7 and 8 were moved to the former High School two-story campus, and Carver then served the district as a community center (adult education, health offices). Grades 4, 5 and 6th attended classes at the Intermediate School on Brosig Avenue.

In 1978 an agreement was reached between Navasota ISD and Montgomery Independent School District regarding a new 544-acre (2.20 km^{2}) housing development at the far east-end of the district, situated across Grimes County and Montgomery County. Students in Grimes County portion of "Rolling Oaks" subdivision would be bused across district lines into Montgomery County and then to Navasota for classes. The agreement provided for students in the entire subdivision to attend Montgomery schools, however, property owners would continue to pay school taxes to NISD, but the state would reimburse Montgomery ISD through the State's Average Daily Attendance count.

1984 The "new gym" opened at Navasota Jr. High.

John C. Webb Middle School opened in the mid-1980s and accepted grades 3, 4 and 5, relieving overcrowding at the junior high and elementary school. Parents from Plantersville and Todd Mission petitioned NISD administration for an elementary school in the area east of Navasota, an argument that faded as the decade closed. The 7th and 8th grade moved from the two-story building to the former intermediate school, and the Brosig Street campus was renamed Navasota Jr. High School. The two-story building was vacated, except for the NJH library and music room, and renovation began on the interior.

The 1987 school year opened with 5th graders being moved from John C. Webb Middle School to the two-story building. 2nd Grade was moved from Navasota Elementary to the middle school.

In the Fall 1988 the Navasota football team played in the State 3A Championship, losing to Southlake Carroll High School; the following school year, in Spring 1990, the Navasota Rattler boys basketball team won 35 games, without any losses, eventually winning the Class 3A State Championship. Members of the state championship team included: Shaun Frazier, Mackely Wells, William Robinson, Spencer Taylor, Kevin Baker, Donald Wesley, Steve Bouldin, Ronnie Jackson, Kevin Jefferson, Marlon Jefferson, Tommy Lewis, Derrick Thomas, Coach Mike Dacus, and Assistant Coaches Ken Brannan and Mike Allen. Coach Mike Dacus at the time served, during both championship games, as the district's Athletic Director, Head Football and Basketball Coach.

A 1994 bond election paved the way for construction of a new agricultural department, lights at the baseball field, and a new Navasota Jr. High School.

1994 The term "intermediate school" returned to Navasota ISD, when the two-story building restored the title, Mr. James Simpson served as principal of 5th and 6th grade.

In 1995-1996 school year Durham Transportation, a private company, took over transportation services, cooperating with Brenham and Madisonville ISD's for the district's transportation requirements. Also, Navasota Elementary was renamed Navasota Primary and John C. Webb Middle School opened the new school year, under a new name John C. Webb Elementary School.

Also, the Carver Learning Center was officially designated as the district's Alternative School.

The baseball field's lights were activated for the first time in Spring of 1995. Notably the first baseball game scheduled for "night-time" was called off due to a lightning strike to the new lights.

The 1995 school year opened with a new agricultural department in Navasota High School, the old ag department was converted to a math wing.

1996 The new Navasota Jr. High opened, next to the high school for grades 6-8. The wings of the former junior high on Brosig Avenue were demolished.

1997 Navasota Intermediate opened on Brosig Avenue for grades 4 and 5, and the two-story building was converted to the district's new administrative offices.

A new library was finished at the high school in 2002.

In December 2004 a school bond passed, that resulted in reconfiguring Navasota schools for the future.

In June 2006, the Montgomery Independent School District notified residents in "Rolling Oaks" subdivision that students in Grimes County could no longer attend Montgomery schools, ending the 1978 agreement between the two school districts.

The Navasota High School and Navasota Junior High School campuses are located on adjoining sites east of the Texas 6 freeway bypass. The new football complex is also planned for the site. This photo was taken in late 2004 by Christopher Butler of Butler Planning Services during fieldwork for the 2004 Navasota Comprehensive Plan.

In August 2006, Navasota Primary School completed a renovation and rebuild, merging with the adjacent John C. Webb Elementary School. The renovated facility on Neal Street was named John C. Webb Elementary and greatly enhances the district's elementary level capabilities by including a new physical education gym and cafeteria, along with approximately double the square footage. Students from Webb Elementary follow in 4th and 5th grades at the modern Navasota Intermediate School.

Also for the 2006-2007 school year, High Point Elementary School opened in Stoneham to serve elementary age students in pre-kindergarten to 5th grade that reside in the eastern portion of the district.

June 2007 the school boards of both Navasota and Montgomery schools denied a petition by residents of "Rolling Oaks" subdivision to detach and annex a portion of NISD to MISD. The MISD Board of Trustees, however, voted to allow students who enrolled at Montgomery schools under the 1978 agreement to "attend MISD schools until they complete their requirements for high school graduation". Potentially this clause would allow a "Rolling Oaks" student who entered Kindergarten at MISD in the 2006-2007 school year, under the 1978 agreement, to complete their school career at Montgomery High School in 2019.

At the start of the 2007 school year, Carver Learning Center will be moved to the new "Navasota Education Learning Center". The new learning center will utilize a former elementary school building adjacent to John C. Webb Elementary. A new football field, modernized cafeteria, band hall, athletic fieldhouse and competition gym opened at the Navasota High School/Jr. High School campus.

In 2009, the Navasota High School Band earned the first Sweepstakes Award in school history.

Starting in the 2015-2016 school year, Navasota Intermediate was renamed Brule Elementary, and each of the three elementary schools serves pre-kindergarten thru 5th grade. Elementary students west of LaSalle Avenue in Grimes County attend Brule Elementary, those in Brazos County and east of LaSalle Avenue out to the eastern portions of the district attend Webb Elementary and finally elementary students in the eastern part are zoned to High Point Elementary.

In November 2017 Navasota ISD passed a $61 million dollar bond to make classroom and facility upgrades at Navasota High School, Navasota Jr. High, Brule Elementary, High Point Elementary, John C. Webb Elementary, the Navasota Educational Learning Center (NELC) that houses W.B. Bizzell Academy, DAEP, Head Start, and the Lil' Rattler Academy Daycare. Upgrades were also included for Brosig Auditorium, the Rock Gym, and Ag Farm.

== Enrollment trends ==
School Year	Enrollment	Source
1965-1966	2,356	
1986-1987	2,693	
1988-1989	2,810	
1989-1990	2,882	
1990-1991	2,868	
1991-1992	2,883	
1992-1993	2,941	
1993-1994	2,985	
1994-1995	3,036	
1995-1996	3,036	
1996-1997	3,074	
1997-1998	3,151	
1998-1999	3,183	
1999-2000	3,176	
2000-2001	3,138	
2001-2002	3,052	
2002-2003	3,024	
2003-2004	3,003	
2004-2005	2,926	
2005-2006	2,921	
2006-2007	2,977	
2007-2008	2,969	
2008-2009	2,958	
2009-2010	2,951	
2010-2011	2,939	

== Mascot and School Colors ==
The mascot of Navasota High School is the Rattlers, and is characterized by a student (typically male) in a rattlesnake costume. The character is named "Venom" but can also be known as "Diamond" if the costume is worn by a female NHS student. "Venom's costume uniquely has legs and feet. He actually looks like a lizard, or as students imply, a "gecko."

Navasota Jr. High uses "Fangs" as the school mascot.

Sidewinders represent High Point Elementary as the school's official mascot and “Boas” represent Brule Elementary as the official mascot.

In Spring 2011, John C. Webb Elementary adopted "Vipers" as the campus mascot.

Blue and White is the set of school colors.
