= Ren Faire =

2024 American TV documentary series

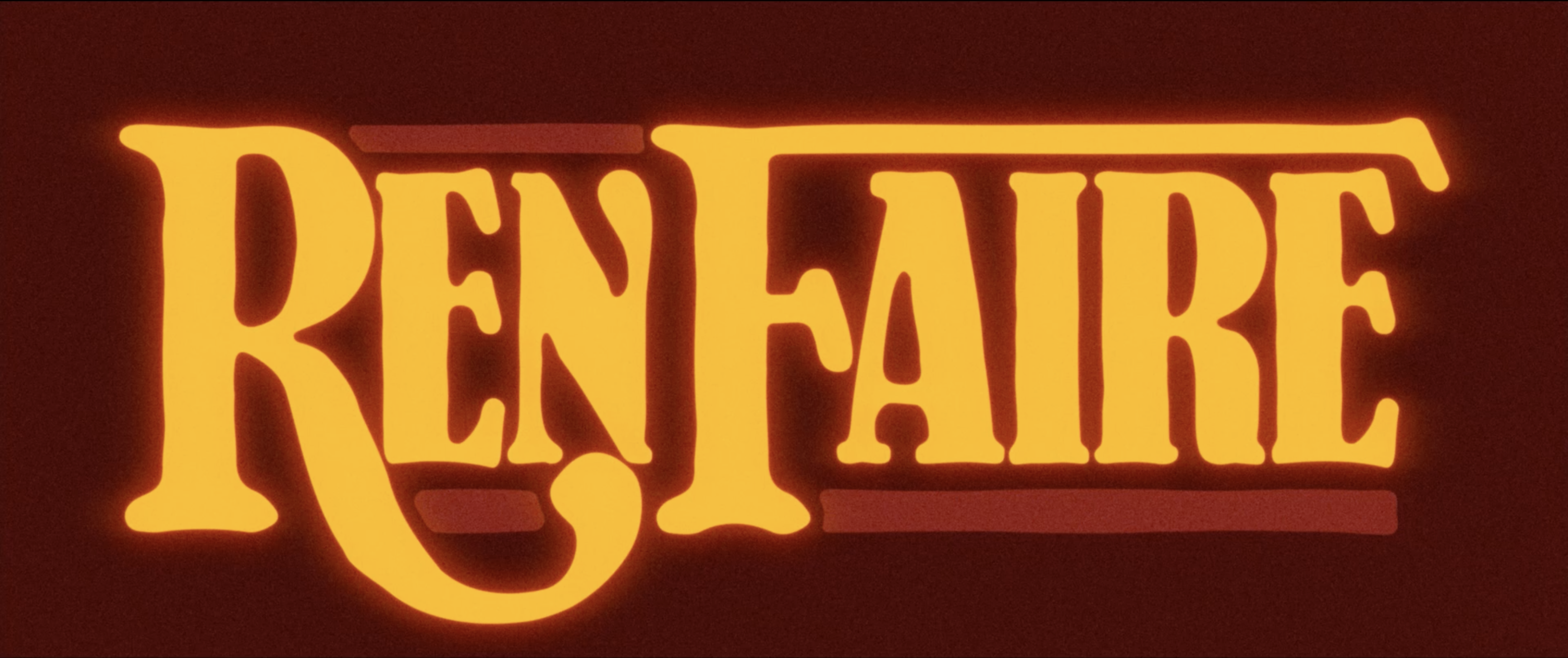
- Genre: Documentary
- Created by: Lance Oppenheim; David Gauvey Herbert
- Directed by: Lance Oppenheim
- Music by: Ari Balouzian
- Country of origin: United States
- Original language: English
- No. of episodes: 3

Production
- Executive producers: Josh Safdie; Benny Safdie; Ronald Bronstein; Dani Bernfeld; David Gauvey Herbert; Lance Oppenheim; Eli Bush; Nancy Abraham; Lisa Heller; Sara Rodriguez
- Producers: Abigail Rowe; Christian Vazquez; Max Allman
- Cinematography: Nate Hurtsellers
- Editors: Max Allman; Nicholas Nazmi
- Running time: 53-58 minutes
- Production companies: HBO Documentary Films; Elara Pictures; To Be Formed; Widow's Peak

Original release
- Network: HBO
- Release: June 2 – June 9, 2024

Ren Faire is a three-part American television documentary series directed and produced by Lance Oppenheim that premiered on June 2, 2024, on HBO. The series explores a succession crisis at America's largest Renaissance fair, the Texas Renaissance Festival.

== Premise ==
Ren Faire follows an epic power struggle at the Texas Renaissance Festival, after its founder announces his retirement. The festival's general manager and heir apparent faces off against a kettle-corn kingpin and a former elephant trainer, all vying to reshape the festival in their own vision.

== Cast ==
Featured personnel in the documentary are credited as themselves (in order of appearance):

- George Coulam
- Jeffrey Baldwin
- Louie Migliaccio
- Darla Smith
- Brandi Baldwin
- Lauren Croft

== Episodes ==
No.	Title	Directed by	Original release date
1	"Daddy’s Dyin, Who’s Got The Will?"	Lance Oppenheim	June 2, 2024
During the 2021 Texas Renaissance Festival (TRF) season, founder and octogenarian George "The King" Coulam considers retiring. General manager and former stage actor Jeff Baldwin is steadfastly loyal to George and believes he will be selected as heir; his lack of business experience is a concern. Meanwhile, vendor Louie Migliaccio, owner of the Kettle corn stand, plans to purchase the TRF from George. However, the matter is further complicated by George's cantankerous and fickle personality; he spends his days in his eccentric mansion being waited on and using online sugar dating sites. Jeff is distraught to learn that George and Louie are discussing a buyout.
2	"Make Big Choices"	Lance Oppenheim	June 9, 2024
As the 2022 season approaches, Jeff plans to hire his wife, Brandi, as the entertainment director, but George disallows it. Assistant general manager, Lauren Croft, supports Jeff but remains subservient to George to avoid losing her job. Meanwhile, as Louie prepares his offer, vendor coordinator Darla Smith, believing that neither Louie nor Jeff will be able to successfully run the TRF, makes a play for a promotion. George has an unsuccessful date with a 24-year-old woman. He immerses himself into the operations of the TRF, also selling some of his shares to longtime employees and vendors. Jeff convinces George not to sell to Louie, and Darla is promoted to co-manager.
3	"We're Done!"	Lance Oppenheim	June 9, 2024
During the 2022 season, Darla and Jeff compete for George's attention. After a contaminated drinking water hoax makes the news, George fires Jeff. Jeff falls into a deep depression, but returns for the 2023 season, having begged George to let him return as the entertainment director. Darla struggles to work directly under the authoritative George. After another unsuccessful date, George reconsiders selling to Louie, but also considers an offer from a family of Greek food vendors. At the end of the 2023 season, Jeff recommits himself to the TRF, Lauren decides to go back to school, and George once again rebuffs the buyout offers. He fires Darla and names himself the general manager.

== Release ==
The series had its world premiere at the South by Southwest Film Festival on March 9, 2024.

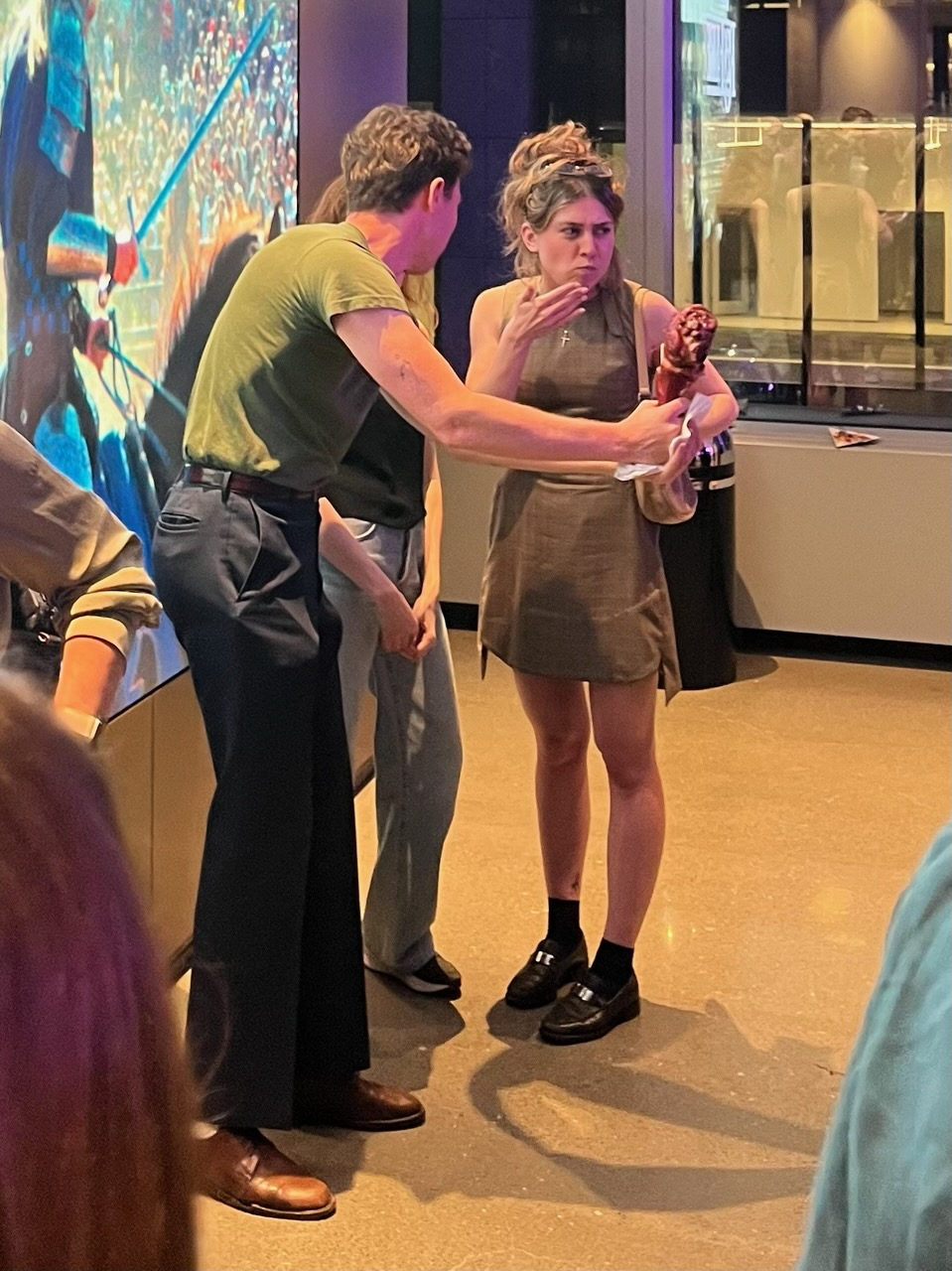
Attendees of a Ren Faire screening in New York City eat turkey legs that HBO distributed as refreshments.

== Reception ==
=== Critical reception ===
On the review aggregator website Rotten Tomatoes, 100% of 19 critics' reviews are positive, with an average rating of 7.9/10. Metacritic, which uses a weighted average, assigned the series a score of 79 out of 100, based on 12 critics, indicating "generally favorable" reviews.

=== Accolades ===
Year	Award	Category	Recipient(s)	Result	Ref.
2024	9th Critics' Choice Documentary Awards	Best Limited Documentary Series	Ren Faire	Nominated	
2025	18th Cinema Eye Honors	Outstanding Non Fiction Series	Lance Oppenheim	Nominated	
2025	18th Cinema Eye Honors	Outstanding Broadcast Editing	Max Allman and Nicholas Nazmi	Nominated	
2025	18th Cinema Eye Honors	Outstanding Broadcast Cinematography	Nate Hurtsellers	Won	
2025	40th Independent Spirit Awards	Best New Non-Scripted or Documentary Series	Lance Oppenheim, Benny Safdie, Josh Safdie, Ronald Bronstein, Dani Bernfeld, David Gauvey Herbert, Nancy Abraham, Lisa Heller, Sara Rodriguez, Abigail Rowe, Christian Vasquez, and Max Allman	Nominated	
2025	2nd Gotham TV Awards	Breakthrough Nonfiction Series	Lance Oppenheim, Benny Safdie, Josh Safdie, Ronald Bronstein, Dani Bernfeld, David Gauvey Herbert, Nancy Abraham, Lisa Heller and Sara Rodriguez	Nominated	
2025	77th Primetime Creative Arts Emmy Awards	Outstanding Cinematography for a Nonfiction Program	Nate Hurtsellers	Nominated	
