= Lake Creek Settlement =

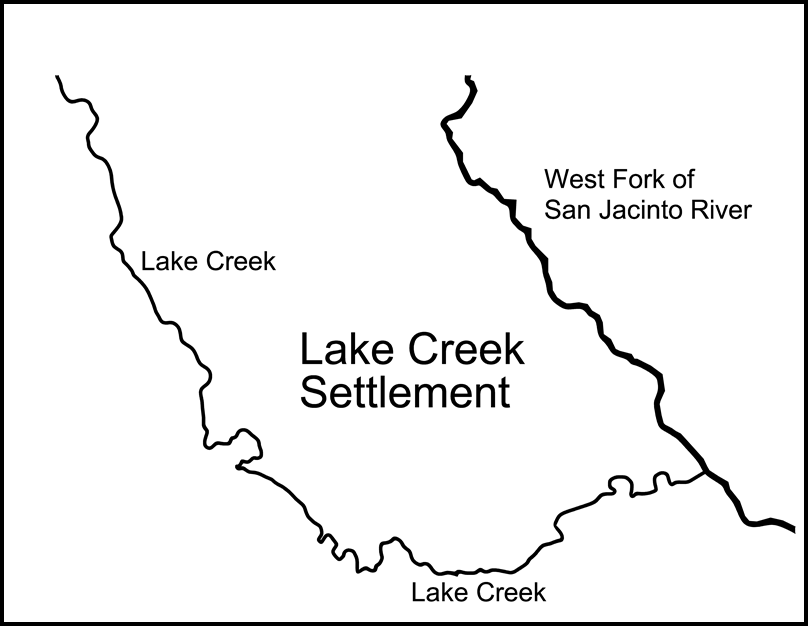
Map of the Lake Creek Settlement (1830s -1840s) in Texas

The Lake Creek Settlement (circa 1830s through the 1840s) was a settlement in Stephen F. Austin's Second Colony, located in Mexican Texas, and later the Republic of Texas after it gained independence in 1836. The Lake Creek Settlement was located between the West Fork of the San Jacinto River (Texas) and the stream known as Lake Creek. It was the first Anglo-American settlement in what is today western Montgomery County, Texas.

In July 1837, the town of Montgomery, Texas, was founded in the middle of the Lake Creek Settlement, at the site of W. W. Shepperd's store. It was located near the West Fork of the San Jacinto River, which had keel boat navigation to that point.

== Background ==
In 1821, Mexico gained independence from Spain. It formed a new nation from much of the lands that had comprised New Spain, including Spanish Texas. Because this area was sparsely populated, the Republic combined Texas with Coahuila to create a new state, Coahuila y Tejas.

The war had bankrupted the new Mexican government and it had little money to devote to the military. It authorized settlers to raise militias for their defense against hostile Indian tribes, who were seeking to expel the European Americans from their territory. Mexican Texas was raided by the Apache and Comanche, who were powerful in this area. Believing that an increase in settlers in the new state could help to deter the Indian raids, the Mexican government liberalized its immigration policies for the region. For the first time, it allowed settlers from the United States to Texas y Coahuila.

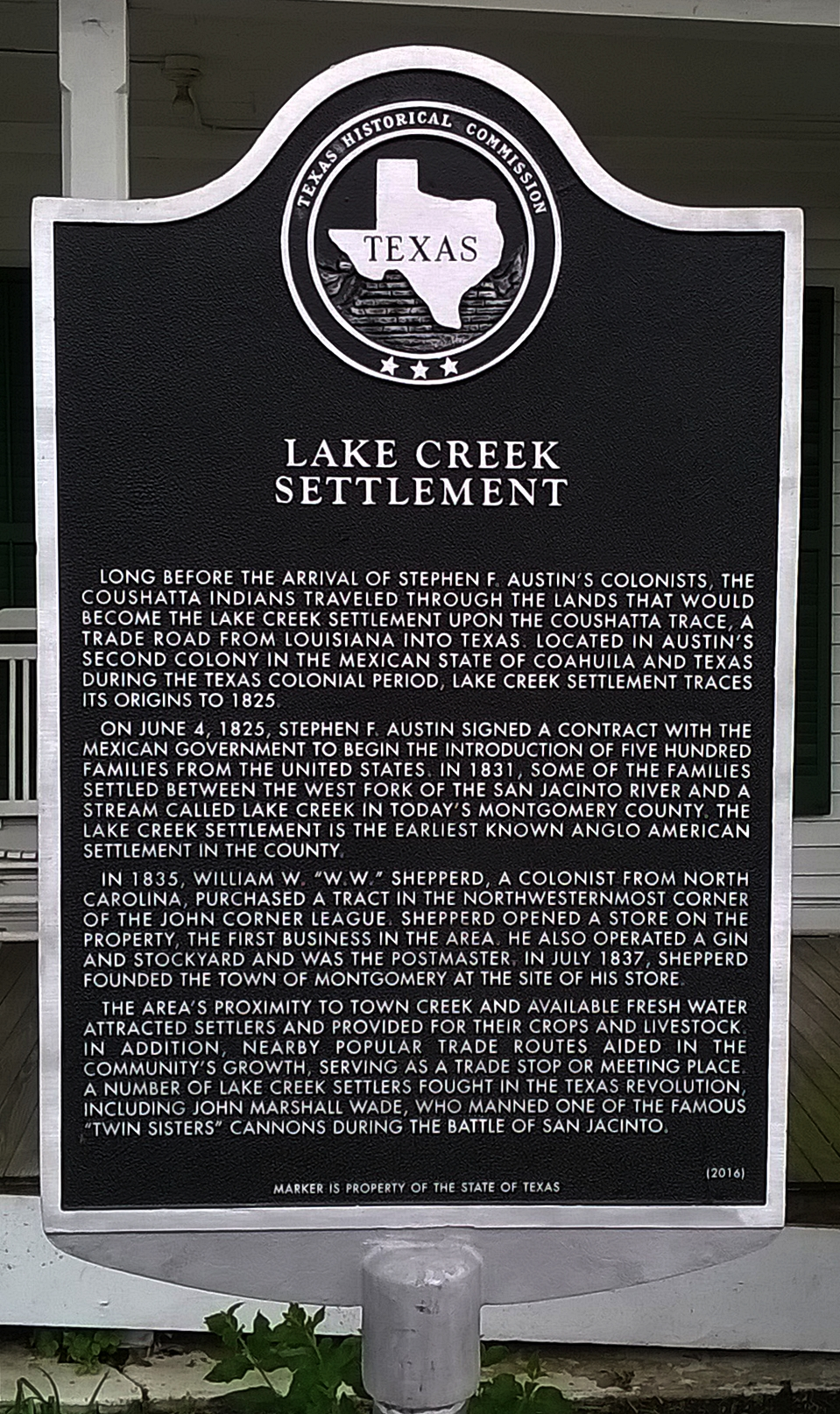
a Texas Historical Commission marker for Lake Creek Settlement is located in front of the N. H. Davis Museum and Pioneer Complex, 308 Liberty Street, Montgomery, Texas.

Anglo-American Stephen F. Austin became the first empresario to establish a colony in Texas successfully. Under the 1823 Imperial Colonization Law of Mexico, an empresario could receive a land grant within the Mexican province of Texas. Together with a commissioner appointed by the governor, he was authorized to distribute land to settlers and issue them titles in the name of the Mexican government. Only one contract was approved under this legislation, the first contract granted to Austin.

Between 1824 and 1828, Austin granted 297 titles under this contract. Each head of household received a minimum of 177 acres or 4,428 acres, depending on whether they intended to farm or raise livestock. The grant could be increased for large families or those wishing to establish a new industry, but required the lands to be cultivated within two years. The settlers who received titles under Austin's first contract later became known as the Old Three Hundred. As many of these settlers came from the South, they brought enslaved African Americans with them to work and clear the land. As they developed cotton plantations in this area, they were dependent on the enslaved workers for it to be profitable.

The 1824 General Colonization Law made all heads of household who were citizens of or immigrants to Mexico eligible to claim land. The law did not differentiate among races or social status, but immigrants were required to be Roman Catholic, and foreigners were expected to learn Spanish. Persons who had been granted occupancy rights were allowed to claim the land patent for dwellings. Settlers were required to own property or have a craft or useful profession. All persons wishing to live in Texas were expected to report to the nearest Mexican authority for permission to settle.

The state government in Saltillo approved grants for land. They were soon besieged by foreign speculators wanting to bring colonists into the state. Coahuila y Tejas implemented the federal law in 1825. At this time, about 3500 people lived in Texas, mostly congregated at San Antonio and La Bahia.

Under the new law, people who did not already possess property in Texas could claim one square league of irrigable land, with an additional league available to those who owned cattle. Soldiers were given first choice of land, followed by Mexican citizens, and immigrants. Empresarios and individuals with large families were exempt from the limit. Those who had owned land under Spanish control were allowed to retain their property as long as they had not fought with the Spanish during the Mexican War of Independence. Immigrants were subject to the same policies as Mexican citizens. Indians who migrated to Texas after Mexican independence and were not native to the area were to be treated as immigrants. Enslaved African Americans were not recognized as citizens or immigrants.

== Establishment of Second Colony ==
On May 20, 1825, Stephen F. Austin obtained from the Mexican State of Coahuila y Texas a new contract, to introduce 500 families to the area. Signed on June 4, 1825, this contract was to be completed within six years. Order No. 24, dated March 7, 1827, defined the boundaries of Austin's Second Colony as follows:

Beginning on the west bank of the river San Jacinto, at the ten border leagues of the coast of the Gulf of Mexico; thence following its course with the right bank of said river to its source on a straight line north to the road leading from Bexar to Nacogdoches; thence with the said road westward to a point north from the headwaters of Labaca creek; thence on a line due south towards the sources of the aforesaid creek; thence down said creek, on the eastern bank of the same, to the boundary line of the ten littoral leagues, parallel with the coast, to the place of beginning.

— Order No. 24

The West Fork of the San Jacinto River was navigable by keel boat up to this area, which added to the area's desirability. Travel by water was the main method of transportation of persons and freight. Under the 1825 contract, Stephen F. Austin granted land to a number of Anglo-American colonists in 1831. Some of these settlers in Austin's Second Colony received leagues of land along the eastern boundary of the colony in what is today western Montgomery County; they were the first Anglo-American settlers in that county. Each of these leagues of land contained 4,428.4 acres. Elias R. Wightman was the surveyor of all this territory. The chain carriers assisting him included, at various times, William Rankin, Mathew Hubert, John Corner, William Atkins, and James Rankin.

The early settlers who qualified and received a league of land included:

Colonist - Date of grant	Colonist - Date of grant
Mary Corner - April 7, 1831	William M. Rankin - April 10, 1831
James Pevehouse - April 7, 1831	Noah Griffith - April 11, 1831
Archibald Hodge - April 8, 1831	Benjamin Rigby - April 14, 1831
James Hodge - April 8, 1831	William Atkins - April 18, 1831
Owen Shannon - April 8, 1831	Jacob Shannon - April 30, 1831
William C. Clark - April 10, 1831	Raleigh Rogers - May 6, 1831
William Landrum - April 10, 1831	John Corner - May 10, 1831
Zachariah Landrum - April 10, 1831	Anne White - May 12, 1831

By 1833, this settlement between the West Fork of the San Jacinto River and the stream called Lake Creek had already become known throughout Mexican Texas as the Lake Creek Settlement. It was also commonly referred to as the "neighborhood of Lake Creek", the district of Lake Creek", the "precinct of Lake Creek", or simply as "Lake Creek".

Jacob Shannon - To - Rutha Miller

Texas Austins Colony

Lake Creek Settlement

August 8th 1833

Articles of Agreement made and entered into between Jacob Shannon of the one part and Rutha Miller of the other part both of the Colony and Settlement aforesaid, Showeth that the said Jacob for and in consideration of an agreement entered into heretofore the said Jacob is to let the said Rutha have the one half of his League of land lying in the said neighborhood, the said Rutha having paid the one half of the expense, said League which League being known by the name Beadye on which the parties now settled so as to be divided as to the equal to both of the parties in soyal, water and timber, all of which League is held by the said Jacob by grant from the Government...

Jacob Shannon

— Montgomery County Deeds, Vol. N, page 254.

== Growth ==
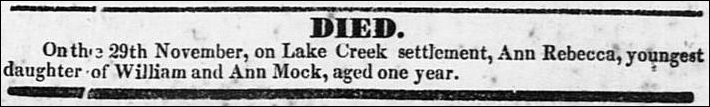
Death notice of Ann Rebecca Mock, Lake Creek Settlement, as reported in Telegraph and Texas Register newspaper, December 17, 1836.

After the first settlers received their land grants in 1831, more settlers began to arrive. These early families included: Cartwright, Chatham, Galbraith, Garret, Mock, Shepperd, Springer, and Worsham.

Stephen F. Austin's Register of Families describes a land grant to Thomas Chatham within the Lake Creek Settlement in 1834:

Thomas Chatham from the State of Alabama. 33 years old. Ditha his wife 23 years old. 1 Male child 3 female do. Occupation farming. Applies for 4 quarters of league in Lake Creek settlement, marked J. M. Springer who relinquishes in favor of Chatham. Relinquishes first selection and applies for vacant land between Austin and Greenwood.

— Stephen F. Austin's Register of Families, Book 2

By 1835, the population of Lake Creek had become large enough to support a trading post. William W. Shepperd, originally from North Carolina, purchased 200 acres of land on the John Corner League near the middle of the settlement. There he established the trading post that became known as "the store of W. W. Shepperd on Lake Creek." Shepperd's older brother Augustine Henry Shepperd served several terms as a US Congressman of the Whig Party representing North Carolina.

William Shepperd's store quickly became the meeting place and community center for area settlers. In 1835, John Bricker also built a mill and a cotton gin for Shepperd at the trading post site.

== Texas Revolution ==
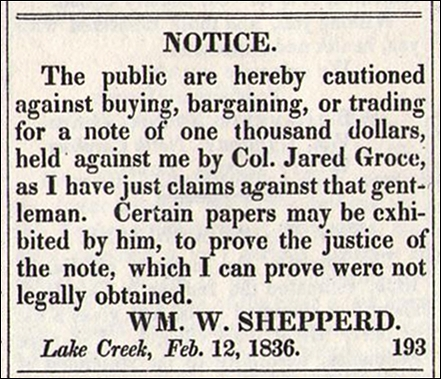
Advertisement by William W. Shepperd, a merchant in Lake Creek during the Texas Revolution: This was published in the March 17, 1836 edition of the Telegraph and Texas Register newspaper, printed at San Felipe de Austin, Texas. (For context, the Battle of the Alamo began on February 23, 1836.)

When the Texas Revolution broke out, the Lake Creek Settlement was considered part of Washington Municipality. Several residents fought for independence against Mexico, including Jacob H. Shepperd, Mathew Cartwright, William Cartwright, Thomas Chatham, Raleigh Rogers, Jacob Shannon, Evin Corner, John Marshall Wade, A. U. Springer, James J. Foster, and John Bricker. These soldiers fought in one or more battles, including the Powder House Fight, the Battle of Concepción, the Grass Fight, the Siege of Bexar, the battle on the Brazos River at San Felipe de Austin, and the Battle of San Jacinto.

And Jacob Shannon says that he is a resident citizen of Montgomery County...that he knew the said Mathew Cartwright now present before him, in the year 1835 at and in Lake Creek Settlement now said County of Montgomery that he also knew him in the Army of Texas in the Campaign at San Antonio de Bexar in the year 1835 that he went from said Settlement in company with himself as members of Capt Fosters company under Capt Jos L Bennet (Foster having resigned) that he saw said Mathew Cartwright at the Siege of Bexar for and during six weeks...

— Jacob Shannon, Pension Claim Application File of Mathew Cartwright, Texas State Library and Archives Commission

John Marshall Wade manned one of the "Twin Sisters" cannon during the Battle of San Jacinto.

And Thomas Chatham says on his oath that he personally knew the said John M Wade now here present before him in the year 1835 in the month of October at the place called Lake Creek Settlement now the town of Montgomery...that the said Wade and himself joined Capt W Wares company and under his command joined the army of the Republic of Texas under the command of Genl Sam Houston on the Colorado River...said Wade and himself came with said Army to Groce's Plantation on the Brazos River and that said Wade was detailed to serve with the Artillery on the 16th or 17th of April 1836...That the said John M. Wade participated in the Battle of San Jacinto, to the best of his belief and knowledge on the 21st day of April 1836, that he returned from said Battle to the Lake Creek Settlement now the county and town of Montgomery where he resided for many years in fact up to the present date...

— Thomas Chatham, Pension Claim Application File of John M. Wade, Texas State Library and Archives Commission

Jacob H. Shepperd had attended West Point as a young man, but withdrew and immigrated with his family to Texas. Shepperd fought in the Powder House Fight, the Battle of Concepción, and the Siege of Bexar of the revolution. Shortly after the revolution, he delivered a dispatch from General Sam Houston at Aies Bayou that saved the life of Mexican President Antonio López de Santa Anna. The latter was being held by the army and was threatened with removal for a court-martial. This action was suspended on Houston's direction. Texas historian Henderson Yoakum credited Shepperd with carrying the document that protected Santa Anna.

It is proper to state here a movement in the army, consequent upon the attempt by Pages to rescue Santa Anna. It was the wish of many, and was generally reported, that by a vote of that body, it was resolved to conduct the captive to headquarters, and place him before a court-martial. General Houston, then at Aies Bayou, being informed of these alleged proceedings, dispatched his protest against them. He [Houston] protested against it, because of all the advantages accruing to Texas by his [Santa Anna's] capture would thus be destroyed. The protest reaching the army, was sent to Columbia. A captain with his command had, just before its arrival, gone, as was said, after the prisoner, to bring him to the army; and the protest only reached Captain Patton, who had the captive in charge, in time to prevent his removal. Captain J. H. Sheppard, the bearer of the document, says the pleasant change of affairs filled Santa Anna with joy, and he embraced him as one who had saved his life.

— Henderson Yoakum, History of Texas from Its First Settlement in 1685 to Its Annexation to the United States in 1846 Volume 2 (1856/reprint in 2013)

== Founding of Montgomery, Texas ==
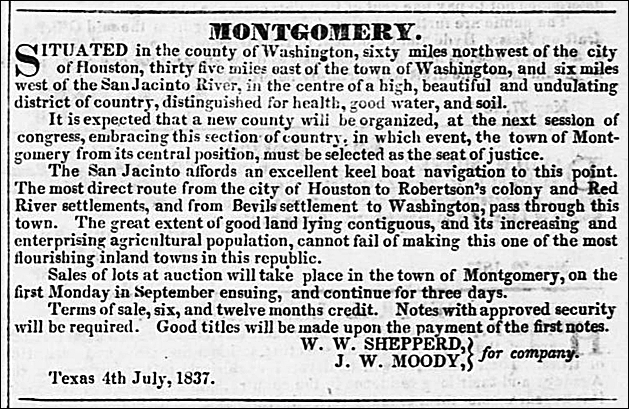
Advertisement for the sale of lots in the Town of Montgomery, Texas, Telegraph and Texas Register newspaper, July 8, 1837, published in Houston, Texas.

Following the revolution, the Republic of Texas reorganized some areas. Among the new jurisdictions was Washington County, composed of six large precincts. One was named for the Lake Creek Settlement within these boundaries. Washington County Chief Justice John P. Coles provided the following description of the boundaries of Washington County to the Secretary of State of the Republic of Texas in early 1837:

Washington.-Beginning at the mouth of Caney creek on the west bank of the Brazos river; thence following said creek to its source; thence west on the dividing ridge between the waters of New Year's creek and the principal or western fork of Mill creek until it strikes the eastern line of the county of Mina to the San Antonio road; from thence following said road eastward crossing the Brazos river to the west bank of Trinity river; thence following down said west bank to the county of Liberty (which is undefined); from thence following said line of Liberty to the northeast corner of the county of Harrisburg; from thence following the north line of the county of Harrisburg to the northeast corner of the county of Austin, so as to include Lake Creek settlement; from said northeast corner of the county of Austin, following the north line of Austin, to the mouth of Ponn [Pond] creek on the east bank of the Brazos river; and thence up said east bank to the point opposite the mouth of Caney creek, and thence across the Brazos river to the place of beginning...

— John P. Coles chief justice

In 1837, W. W. Shepperd, in association with John Wyatt Moody, founded the town of Montgomery, Texas at the site of Shepperd's store in the middle of Lake Creek Settlement. J. W. Moody was the First Auditor of the Republic of Texas and had been Auditor of the Provisional Government of Texas. They advertised sale of lots in the Telegraph and Texas Register, July 8, 1837, published in Houston, Texas.

== Creation of Montgomery County ==
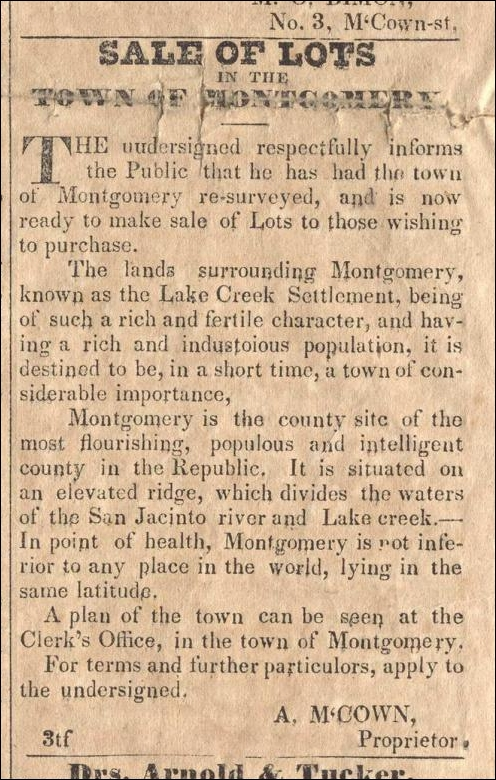
1845 - Town of Montgomery Advertisement - "The lands surrounding Montgomery known as the Lake Creek Settlement..."

On December 14, 1837, the Congress of the Republic of Texas passed an Act creating Montgomery County, Texas. In the following weeks, the town of Montgomery, located in the center of the Lake Creek Settlement became the county seat of Montgomery County. Montgomery County was initially composed of three large political precincts that had previously formed eastern Washington County: the Viesca Precinct, the San Jacinto Precinct and the Lake Creek Precinct. The Viesca Precinct included most of the territory of present-day Grimes County, Texas (created 1846). The San Jacinto Precinct included most of the territory of present-day Walker County, Texas (created 1846). The Lake Creek Precinct included most of the territory of present-day Montgomery County, Texas.

An official Texas historical marker was approved by the Texas Historical Commission for the Lake Creek Settlement on January 29, 2016. On May 17, 2016, the Montgomery Independent School District Board of Trustees named the new MISD high school Lake Creek High School after the Lake Creek Settlement. The official Texas Historical Commission marker for the Lake Creek Settlement was dedicated at a ceremony in front of the Nat Hart Davis Museum and Pioneer Complex in Montgomery, Texas on February 25, 2017. Lake Creek High School, the second comprehensive high school in the Montgomery Independent School District, opened on August 21, 2018.
