= Navasota High School =

Public school in Texas, United States

Location
- 1 Rattler Dr. Navasota, Texas 77868; United States
- Coordinates: 30.4006°N 96.0690°W

Information
- School type: Public high school
- School district: Navasota Independent School District
- Principal: Derek Bowman
- Teaching staff: 68.39 (FTE)
- Grades: 9-12
- Enrollment: 933 (2023–2024)
- Student to teacher ratio: 13.64
- Colors: Blue and white
- Athletics conference: UIL Class AAAA
- Mascot: Rattler
- Website: Navasota High School

Navasota High School is a public high school located in the city of Navasota, Texas, USA and classified as a 4A school by the University Interscholastic League. It is a part of the Navasota Independent School District located in south central Grimes County. In 2016, the school was rated "Met Standard" by the Texas Education Agency.

Its attendance boundary includes Navasota, Pinebrook, Plantersville, Todd Mission, Millican, and Stoneham.

== Athletics ==
The Navasota Rattlers compete in volleyball, cross country, football, basketball, soccer, powerlifting, golf, tennis, track, baseball, and softball.

=== State titles ===
Navasota (University Interscholastic League)

- Boys Basketball
  - 1990(3A)
- Football
  - 2012(3A/D2), 2014(4A/D1)

Navasota Carver (PVIL)

- Boys Basketball
  - 1959(PVIL-3A)

==== State Finalist ====
Navasota (University Interscholastic League)

- Football
  - 1988(3A)

== Notable alumni ==
- Clay Condrey, (born November 19, 1975) former Major League Baseball relief pitcher for the Philadelphia Phillies and San Diego Padres
- Shelton Eppler, professional football quarterback.
- Jarvis Harrison, (born December 25, 1991), former professional football offensive guard
- R. Bowen Loftin, (born June 29, 1949), president of the University of Missouri and a 1967 graduate of Navasota High School.
