= Montgomery High School (Texas) =

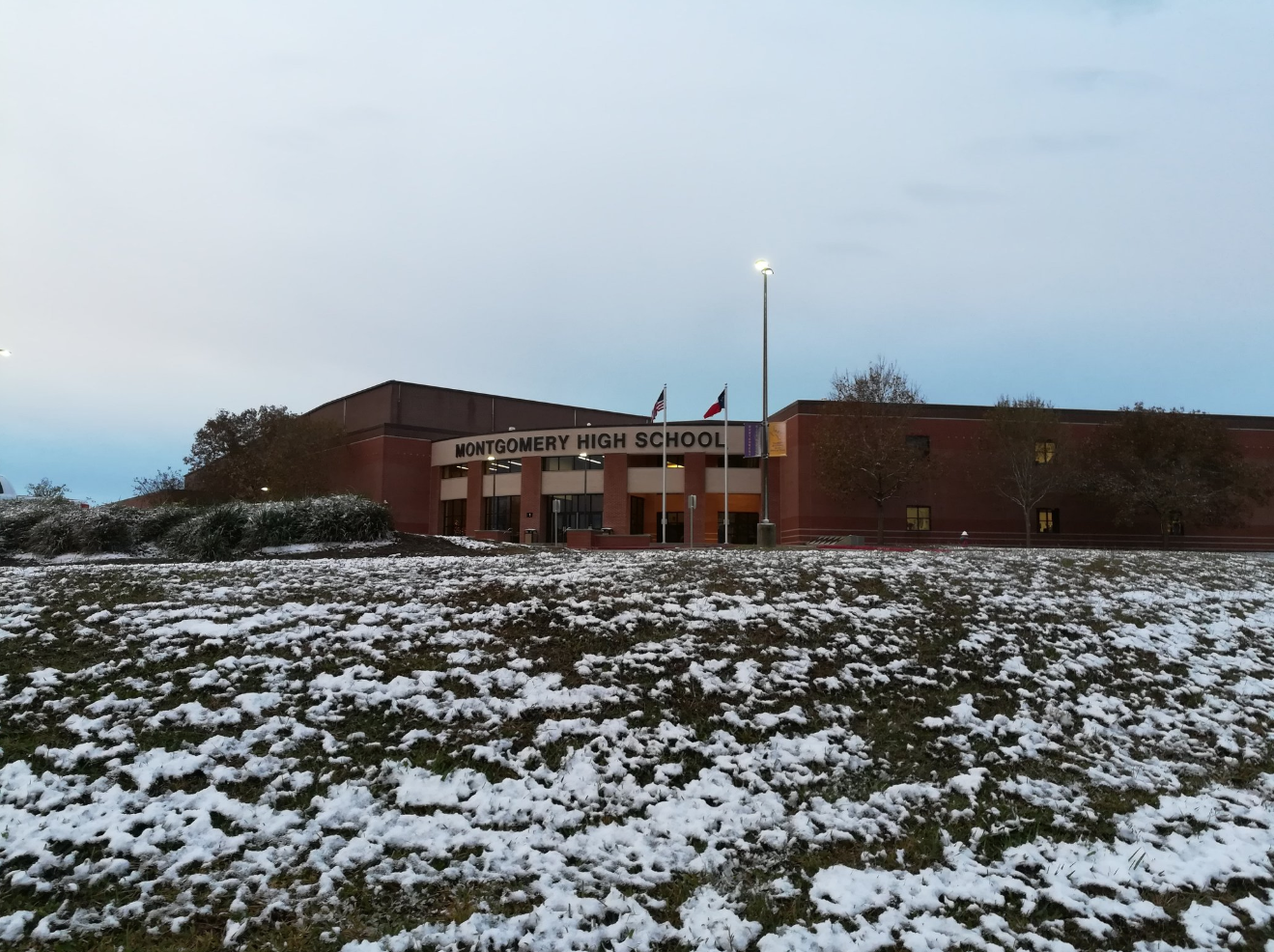

Location
- 22825 Highway 105 West; Montgomery, Texas 77356; United States; 30.3489°N 95.6656°W

Information
- Type: Public Secondary
- Motto: Welcome to Bear Country!
- Established: 1931
- School district: Montgomery Independent School District
- CEEB code: 444865
- NCES School ID: 483126003513
- Principal: Dr. Troy Collavo
- Faculty: 95.22 (on an FTE basis)
- Grades: 9–12
- Enrollment: 1,523 (2024-2025)
- Student to teacher ratio: 15.99
- Colors: Purple and gold
- Athletics conference: UIL Class 5A
- Mascot: Bears
- Website: montgomeryhs.misd.org

Montgomery High School, abbreviated as MHS or Mogo, is a high school in unincorporated Montgomery County, Texas, west of the City of Montgomery. A part of the Montgomery Independent School District, the school's attendance zone includes the city of Montgomery and portions of unincorporated Montgomery County, including most of the west and south shores of Lake Conroe. For the 2018–2019 year, the school received an "A" rating from the Texas Education Agency.

== History ==
The original regional grade school, then called Area Private School, opened in 1850 at what is now the Church Of Christ In Montgomery. After the creation of Montgomery ISD, the first high school opened in 1931 at what is now Montgomery Elementary School, just south of town on State Road 149. A new campus was built on a different site in 1967 west of town on Highway 105, where the school still currently stands. A huge increase in local population caused the school to be expanded in 1998 and again in 2005. After reaching well above maximum occupancy due to a massive influx of new residents, Montgomery High School split with a new high school, Lake Creek High School, which opened in 2018.

In 2019, a hazing assault by members of the school's varsity football team occurred on several younger players, who were "violated in some way with crutches, pool cues, or sports drink bottles." The school forfeited the following football game and the suspects received informal probation.

The school closed two days early for spring break in 2020 due to the COVID-19 pandemic as it spread through Montgomery County.

== Demographics ==
As of the 2018–2019 school year, MHS had 1775 students enrolled.

- 78.3% were White
- 13.5% were Hispanic
- 3.8% were African American
- 1.5% were Asian
- 0.5% were American Indian
- 0.2% were Pacific Islander
- 2.3% were part of Two or More races

21.5% of students were eligible for free or reduced-price lunch.

== Academics ==
For each school year, the Texas Education Agency rates school performance using an A–F grading system based on statistical data. For 2018–2019, the school received a score of 91 out of 100, resulting in an A grade. The school received a score of 88 the previous year.

== Feeder patterns ==
The following elementary schools (K-5) feed into Montgomery High School:

- Lincoln
- Madeley Ranch
- Montgomery Elementary
- Stewart Creek (partial)

Montgomery Junior High (6–8) is the sole junior high feeder into Montgomery High School.

== Notable alumni ==
- Quinton Spears - NFL linebacker
