= George Coulam =

American business owner and politician (1937–2025)

- Born: May 2, 1937; Salt Lake City, Utah, U.S.
- Died: May 21, 2025 (aged 88); Todd Mission, Texas, U.S.
- Other names: The King; King George
- Occupations: Business owner, mayor
- Known for: Founder of the Texas Renaissance Festival
- Website: www.georgeccoulam.com

George C. Coulam (May 2, 1937 – May 21, 2025) was an American business owner. He was the founder and onetime owner of the Texas Renaissance Festival (TRF), now the largest Renaissance fair in the United States. Coulam served as the mayor of Todd Mission, Texas from 1982 to May 2025.

== Early life ==
Coulam was born to a Mormon family in Salt Lake City, Utah on May 2, 1937. He attended the San Fernando Valley State College.

== Life and work ==
In 1974, Coulam and his brother David purchased 15 acres (6 ha) of land on a former strip mine and founded the TRF. In 1982, Coulam and others incorporated the city of Todd Mission and expanded the TRF. In 1999, Coulam married Susie, a woman from Thailand. Coulam's mansion, Stargate Manor, sits on 200 acres (81 ha) of land in Todd Mission.

In 2012, Coulam authored a book entitled Mind-Wars, which claims that holistic medicine reversed his Alzheimer's disease.

At the end of the 2010s Coulam was publicly accused of sexual harassment, including in a lawsuit by a former personal assistant in 2018, and a lawsuit by another former personal assistant in 2020.

George is ... a self-made king. I don't know how many there are out there in America, probably very few, but this is a man who created the largest Renaissance fair in the country. It got so large that he decided to incorporate a city around the fair, and in that city, he became the mayor of everyone around him. Everyone votes for him every single year. And so in a way, he created a real-life fiefdom, of which he has been the sole ruler of for the last five decades.

— Lance Oppenheim, director of Ren Faire

Coulam drew wider public attention after being featured in the June 2024 release of the HBO documentary series, Ren Faire. American filmmaker Lance Oppenheim began production of the eventual three-part documentary about the future of the TRF as Coulam planned to retire at the end of the 2021 season (an event that Coulam decided to put off indefinitely). The series highlighted a succession crisis as Coulam considered retirement. Not broadcast until 2024, the three-episode series depicts Coulam's lifestyle and the trials and tribulations of the festival over the preceding three-year period. Prior to the series release, Oppenheim described Coulam as a "self-made king" in an interview for NPR's Weekend Edition Sunday.

In May 2025, a sale of TRF was forced under court order due to a deal that Coulam was alleged to have not completed. In the same month, Coulam lost the 2025 election for mayor of Todd Mission.

== Death ==
On May 21, 2025, Coulam was found dead at his home in Todd Mission at the age of 88. On May 28, 2025, it was announced that he died by suicide.

== In popular culture ==
In 2002, Coulam was parodied in a season 6 episode of King of the Hill entitled "Joust Like a Woman."
