= Lake Creek High School =

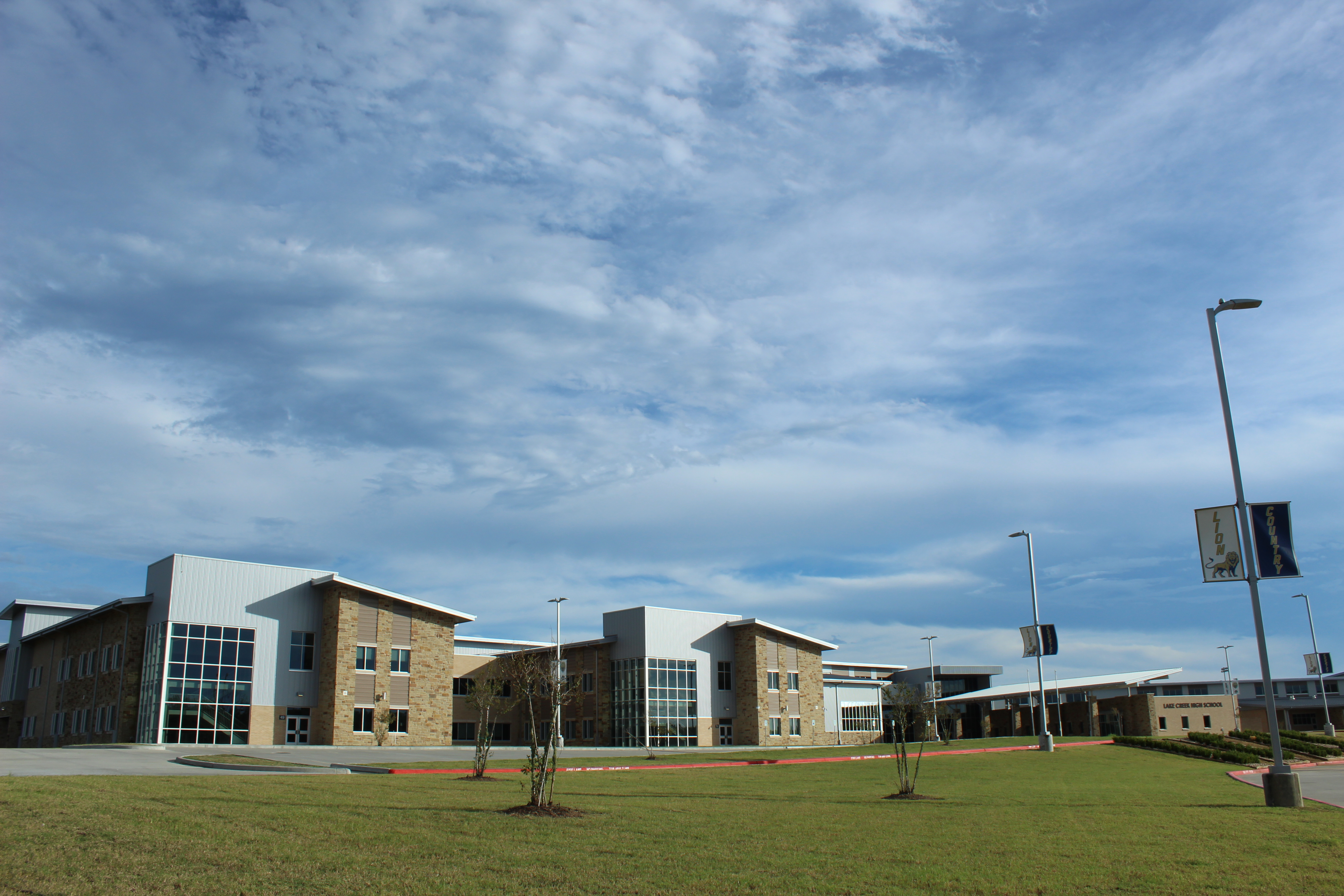

Location
- 20639 FM 2854; Montgomery, Texas 77316; United States; 30.3489°N 95.6656°W

Information
- Other name: LCHS
- School type: Public high school
- Motto: Stand with the Lions
- Established: 2018
- School district: Montgomery Independent School District
- Principal: Tim Williams
- Teaching staff: 97.81 (on an FTE basis)
- Grades: 9–12
- Enrollment: 1,676 (2023–2024)
- Student to teacher ratio: 17.14
- Colors: Navy & gold
- Athletics conference: UIL Class 5A
- Mascot: Lions
- Website: lakecreekhs.misd.org

Lake Creek High School (LCHS) is a high school in unincorporated Montgomery County, Texas, in the United States. It is the second high school built by the Montgomery Independent School District. The school was built after enrollment at Montgomery High School exceeded building capacity. Lake Creek opened on August 21, 2018, for the 2018–2019 school year. The first principal was Phil Eaton. The school is located on Farm to Market Road 2854.

Lake Creek High School is named after the Lake Creek Settlement: an early settlement in Stephen F. Austin's Second Colony established before Texas' independence from Mexico.

== History ==
On May 9, 2015, voters within Montgomery ISD's attendance zone voted in favor of a $256.75 million bond. The bond package included the construction of three schools: a high school, middle school and elementary school. The new high school was included to reduce enrollment at the district's other high school, Montgomery High School, whose student population had risen beyond the school's capacity. Board members decided to name the new school after the Lake Creek Settlement, the first Anglo-American settlement in Montgomery County. The district conducted a survey of future students to determine the school's mascot and colors. The school opened in August 2018 at a cost of $98.28 million. For the 2018–2019 academic year, the school opened with around 900 students in ninth, tenth, and eleventh grades. The school fully incorporated seniors in the 2019–2020 academic year.

The school was closed from March 11 to May 4, 2020, over fears of the coronavirus pandemic.

In October 2021, Principal Phil Eaton announced that he would retire in December of that year. His career spanned 43 years; 13 of which in Montgomery ISD. The school district's assistant superintendent for secondary education, Duane McFadden, was named Lake Creek High School's interim principal for the remainder of the 2021–2022 school year.

In April 2022, the Montgomery ISD Board of Trustees approved the selection of Tim Williams, the then Principal at Oak Hills JH, as the next Principal of Lake Creek High School.

== Demographics ==
As of the 2018–2019 school year, LCHS had 914 students enrolled.

- 78.0% White
- 15.4% Hispanic
- 1.6% African American
- 1.8% Asian
- 1.0% American Indian
- 0.2% Pacific Islander
- 2.0% of two or more races

22.2% of students were eligible for free or reduced-price lunch.

== Academics ==
In accordance with House bill 5 of the 83rd Texas Legislature, Lake Creek High School offers instruction in "core foundation" subjects and "endorsement pathways." Foundation courses include traditional subjects such as English, math, science, and social studies. Originally, to fulfill the foreign language requirement, students could take either Spanish or French. After just one year, the school discontinued the French program, leaving only one language for students to take.

HB5 designates four "endorsement pathways" that students may follow: Arts and Humanities, Business and Industry, Public Service and STEM (Science, Technology, Engineering, Mathematics). For Arts and Humanities, students at Lake Creek High School may take courses such as art, band, choir, dance, debate, journalism and theater arts. For Business and Industry, the school offers courses in agriculture, business, information technology and manufacturing. For Public Service, students may take courses in education, health science, fashion and law enforcement. For STEM, students make take courses in engineering or computer science.

For the 2018–2019 school year, it was given an A rating by the Texas Education Agency.

== Athletics ==
The Lake Creek Lions compete in the following sports: American football, volleyball, basketball, soccer, baseball, softball, track, cross country, swimming, tennis and golf. Students may also participate in cheerleading and the "Royals" dance team.

=== State Titles ===
- Softball
  - 2022(5A), 2023(5A), 2025(5A/D2), 2026(5A/D2)

==== State Finalists ====
- Baseball
  - 2026(5A/D2)

== Campus ==
Lake Creek High School has six athletic fields and a 996-seat auditorium.

In March 2018 an area resident asked the district to construct a sound barrier so his house would get less noise from air conditioners used for the school.

== Attendance and feeder patterns ==
At opening, all sophomores and juniors at Montgomery High School were allowed to choose which high school they attended through an "intra-district transfer". This policy was walked back in 2019 by the school board. As Assistant Superintendent Duane McFadden explained, "You don't get to choose what school you go to."

The following elementary schools (K-5) feed into Lake Creek High School:

- Keenan
- Lone Star
- Stewart Creek (partial)

Oak Hills Junior High School (6-8) is the sole junior high feeder into Lake Creek High School.
