= Montgomery, Texas =

- City
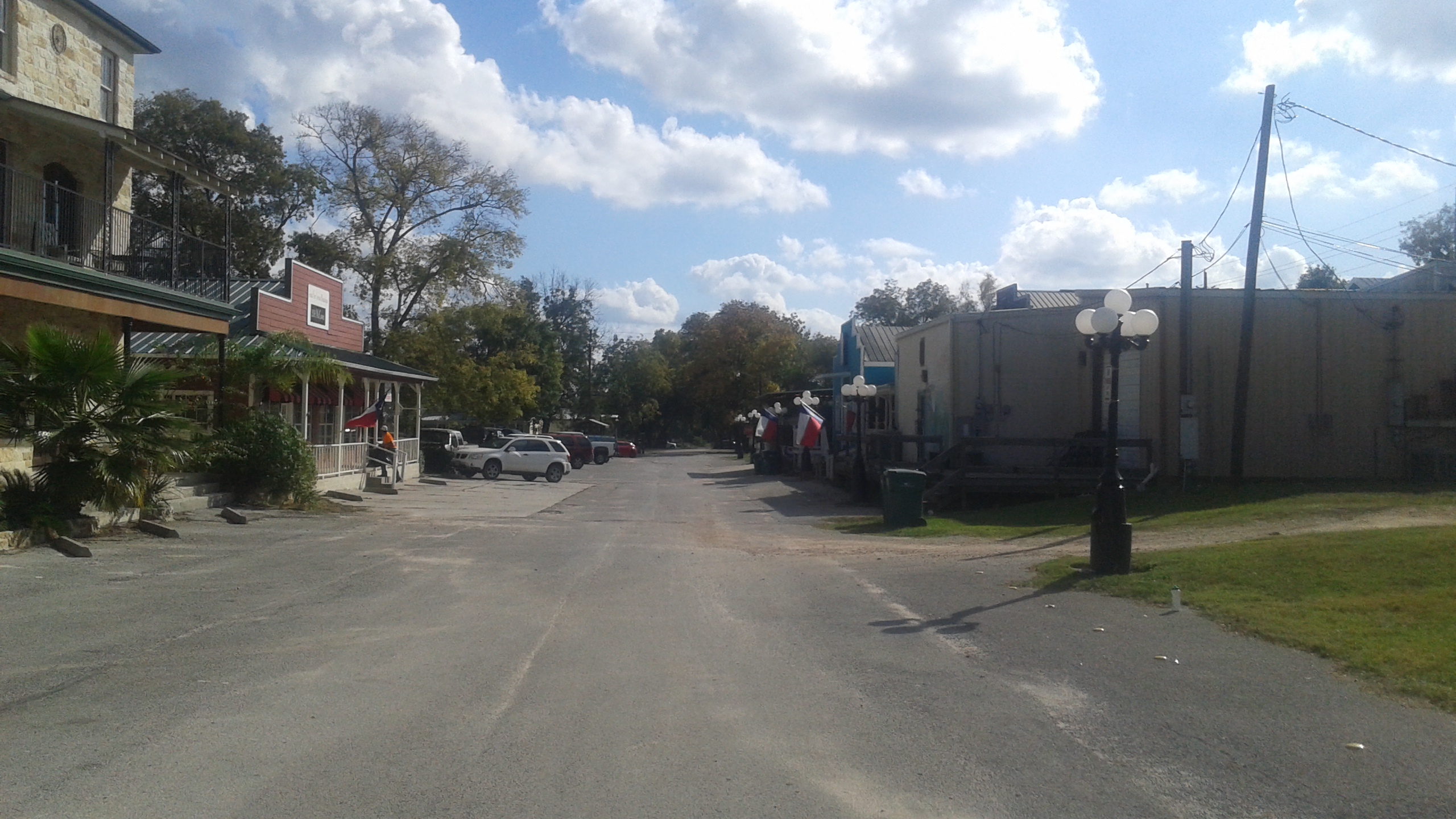
- Historic Business District in Downtown Montgomery.
- Nickname: Lone Star Town
- Motto: Texas is Texas
- Location of Montgomery, Texas
- Coordinates: 30°23′19″N 95°41′48″W
- Country: United States
- State: Texas
- County: Montgomery
- Incorporated: February 26, 1848

Government
  - Mayor: Sara Countryman
  - City Council: Carol Langley; Casey L. Olson (Mayor Pro Tem); Cheryl Fox; Stan Donaldson

Area
  - Total: 5.12 sq mi (13.26 km^{2})
  - Land: 5.04 sq mi (13.05 km^{2})
  - Water: 0.077 sq mi (0.20 km^{2})
- Elevation: 300 ft (90 m)

Population (2020)
  - Total: 1,948
  - Density: 270/sq mi (104.2/km^{2})
- Time zone: UTC-6 (Central (CST))
  - Summer (DST): UTC-5 (CDT)
- ZIP codes: 77316, 77356
- Area code: 936
- FIPS code: 48-49128
- GNIS feature ID: 1382317
- Website: www.montgomerytexas.gov

Montgomery is a city located in Montgomery County, Texas, United States. As of the 2020 census, the city had a total population of 1,948. Known as the birthplace of the Texas flag, it sits next to Lake Conroe.

== History ==
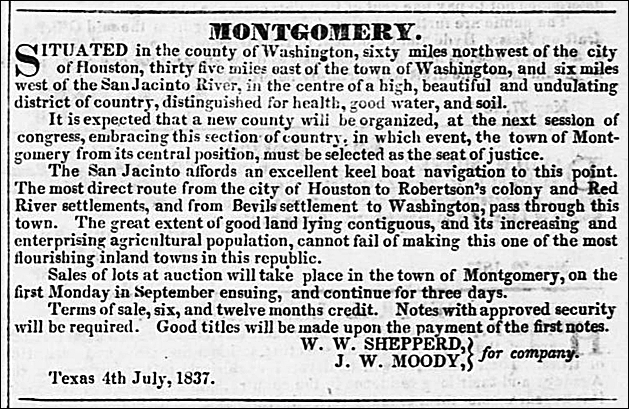
Advertisement for the sale of lots in the Town of Montgomery, Texas from the July 8, 1837, edition of the Telegraph and Texas Register newspaper published in Houston, Texas

The town of Montgomery was founded in the middle of the Lake Creek Settlement by W. W. Shepperd in July 1837 on 200 acres of land that had originally been part of the John Corner League. Shepperd had established the first store in the settlement in 1835; his partner John Wyatt Moody and he named the town Montgomery.

Montgomery became the first county seat of Montgomery County shortly after the county was created on December 14, 1837. It was the third county formed during the Republic of Texas. The county originally extended from the Brazos River to the Trinity. The city was officially incorporated in 1848 with Judge Nathaniel Hart Davis as mayor.

=== Etymology ===
Local histories and accounts by 20th-century historians held that the city and county of Montgomery were named after a family of early settlers to the area: Andrew Montgomery or Owen and Margaret Montgomery Shannon. However, recent evidence provided by Kameron Searle suggests that the town and county more likely were named after Lemuel P. Montgomery, a major in the U.S. Army during the Creek War. John Wyatt Moody, one of the founders of Montgomery, was county clerk of Montgomery County, Alabama, before moving to Texas, which is named for Lemuel P. Montgomery. Sam Houston, the president of the Republic of Texas when the town and county of Montgomery were founded, served in the Battle of Horseshoe Bend with Lemuel P. Montgomery and witnessed his death in the front lines of the battle. According to Searle, Moody and his partner W.W. Shepperd may have used Houston's connection with Lemuel Montgomery to help promote the creation of Montgomery County, with the town of Montgomery as the county seat.

=== Birthplace of the Lone Star Flag ===
On July 7, 1922, Edmund B. Stewart, son of the early Montgomery settler Charles B. Stewart, claimed in a letter that his father had drafted the original design of the Lone Star Flag, enclosing what he claimed was his father's draft of the flag's design. To date, this letter and draft copy, along with claims by Stewart's descendants, remain the only evidence currently known that Charles Stewart was the designer of the flag. In particular, the lack of evidence not directly tied to the Stewart family has caused many flag historians to question Stewart's claim. As a legacy of the Stewart claim, the city of Montgomery describes itself as the "birthplace of the Texas Lone Star Flag."

== Geography ==
Montgomery is located at 30°23'22" North, 95°41'53" West (30.389406, –95.698089).

According to the United States Census Bureau, the city has a total area of 4.6 square miles (12 km^{2}), of which 0.1 sq mi (0.26 km^{2}) (1.31%) is covered by water.

== Demographics ==
Historical population
Census	Pop.	Note	%±
1880	414		—
1970	216		—
1980	258		19.4%
1990	356		38.0%
2000	489		37.4%
2010	621		27.0%
2020	1,948		213.7%
U.S. Decennial Census

=== 2020 census ===
As of the 2020 census, 1,948 people, 804 households, and 596 families resided in the city. The median age was 37.4 years; 26.7% of residents were under 18 and 18.0% of residents were 65 or older. For every 100 females, there were 88.9 males, and for every 100 females 18 and over, there were 81.0 males 18 and over.

About 78.6% of residents lived in urban areas, while 21.4% lived in rural areas.

Of the 804 households in Montgomery, 36.4% had children under 18 living in them, 48.6% were married-couple households, 15.4% were households with a male householder and no spouse or partner present, and 30.2% were households with a female householder and no spouse or partner present. About 29.7% of all households were made up of individuals, and 14.5% had someone living alone who was 65 or older.

Of the 914 housing units, 12.0% were vacant. The homeowner vacancy rate was 8.6% and the rental vacancy rate was 11.2%.

Racial composition as of the 2020 census
Race	Number	Percentage
White	1,513	77.7%
Black or African American	175	9.0%
American Indian and Alaska Native	7	0.4%
Asian	24	1.2%
Native Hawaiian and other Pacific Islander	1	0.1%
Some other race	62	3.2%
Two or more races	166	8.5%
Hispanics or Latinos (of any race)	198	10.2%

=== 2010 census ===
In the 2010 United States census, 621 people, 237 households, and 167 families lived in the city. The racial makeup of the city was 67.1% White, 26.4% African American, 0.6% Native American, 0.6% Asian, 5.0% from other races, and 0.2% from two or more races. About 14.5% of the population were Hispanics or Latinos of any race.

Of the 237 households, 32.1% had children under 18 living with them, 46.4% were married couples living together, 14.3% had a female householder with no husband present, and 29.5% were not families. Around 25.3% of all households were made up of individuals. The average household size was 2.62 and the average family size was 3.13.

In the city, the age distribution was 26.7% under 18, 7.9% from 18 to 24, 24.6% from 25 to 44, 27.5% from 45 to 64, and 13.0% who were 65 or older. The median age was 38.6 years. For every 100 females, there were 95.3 males. For every 100 females 18 and over, there were 95.7 males.

=== American Community Survey (2015) ===
As of the 2015 American Community Survey, the median income for a household in the city was $48,125 and for a family was $63,750. Males had a median income of $41,429 versus $24,000 for females. The per capita income for the city was $27,376; 20.3% of the population and 16.7% of families were below the poverty line. Of the total population, 28.6% of those under 18 and 9.1% of those 65 and older were living below the poverty line.

== Government and infrastructure ==
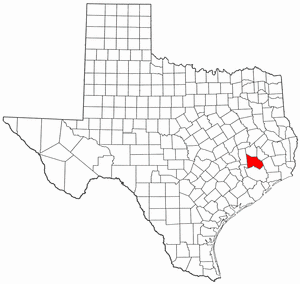
Location of Montgomery County

The City of Montgomery is governed locally by a city council, consisting of a mayor and five council members.

In the Texas Senate, Montgomery is part of Districts 3 and 4, represented by Republicans Robert Nichols and Brandon Creighton. In the Texas House of Representatives, Montgomery is part of Districts 3 and 16, represented by Republicans Cecil Bell Jr. and Will Metcalf, respectively.

In the United States Senate, Republicans John Cornyn and Ted Cruz represent the entire state. In the United States House of Representatives, Montgomery is part of District 8, represented by Republican Morgan Luttrell.

The United States Postal Service operates the Montgomery Post Office at 821H Eva Street (Texas State Highway 105) and the Montgomery Post Office Annex at 21359 Eva Street.

== Education ==
Montgomery is a part of the Montgomery Independent School District. Montgomery ISD is currently changing the structure of their feeder system. Previously, students attended a kindergarten to fourth-grade elementary, a fifth-grade intermediate school, a sixth-grade middle school, a seventh- and eighth-grade junior high school, and a 9th- to 12th-grade high school.

Beginning in the 2017–2018 school year, students instead were to attend a kindergarten to fifth-grade elementary, sixth- to eighth-grade junior high, and 9th– to 12th grade high school.

For students located within Montgomery city limits:

- Kindergarten to fifth-grade students attend Montgomery Elementary.
- Sixth- to eighth-grade students attend Montgomery Junior High.
- The 9th- to 12th-grade students attend Montgomery High School or Lake Creek High School.

Montgomery County Memorial Library System operates the Charles B. Stewart West Branch at 202 Bessie Price Owen Drive.

The Texas Legislature designated Montgomery ISD (and therefore the City of Montgomery) as part of Lone Star College (formerly the North Harris Montgomery Community College District).

== Places ==
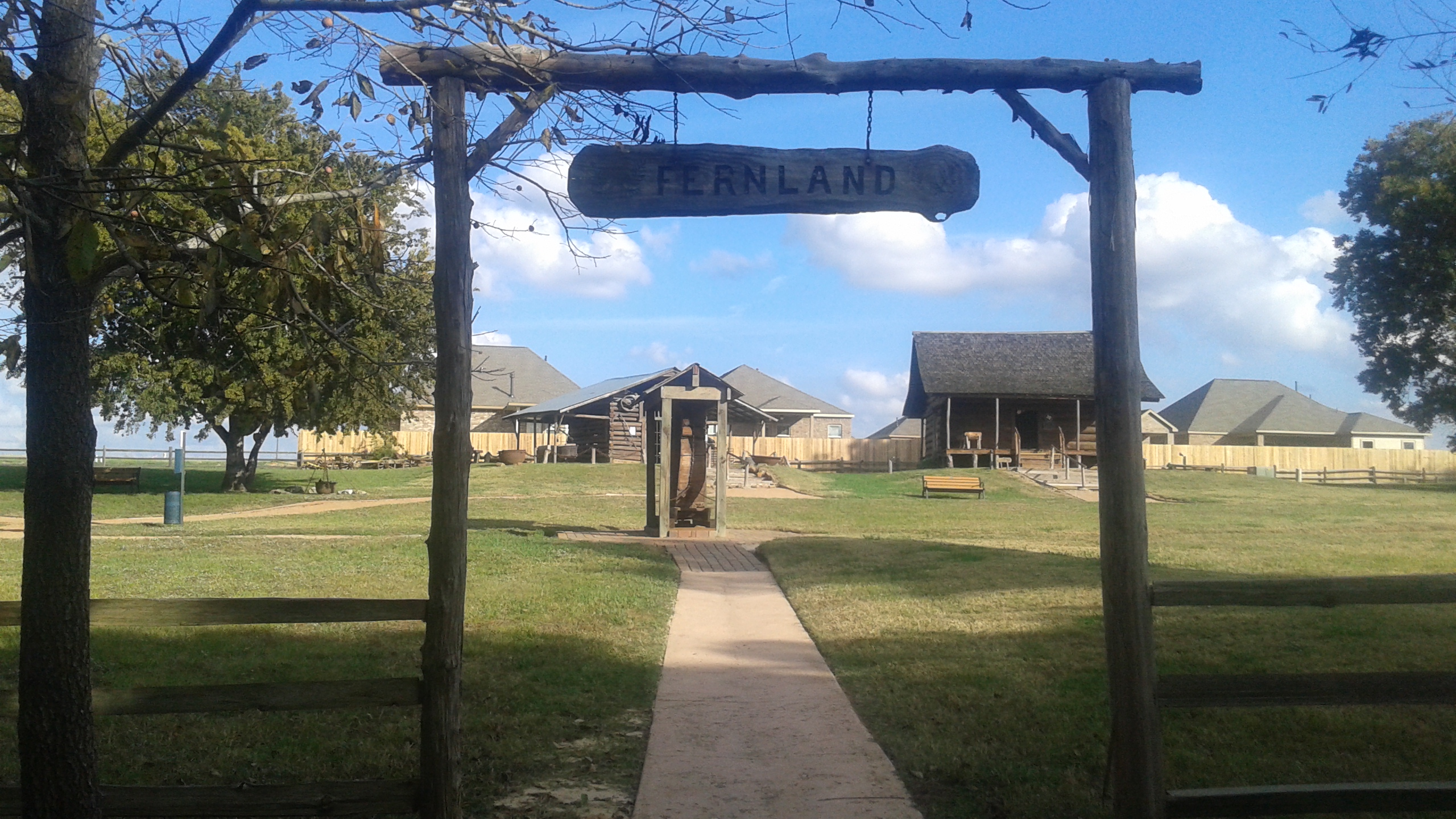
View of the entrance to Fernland Historical Park from Memory Park

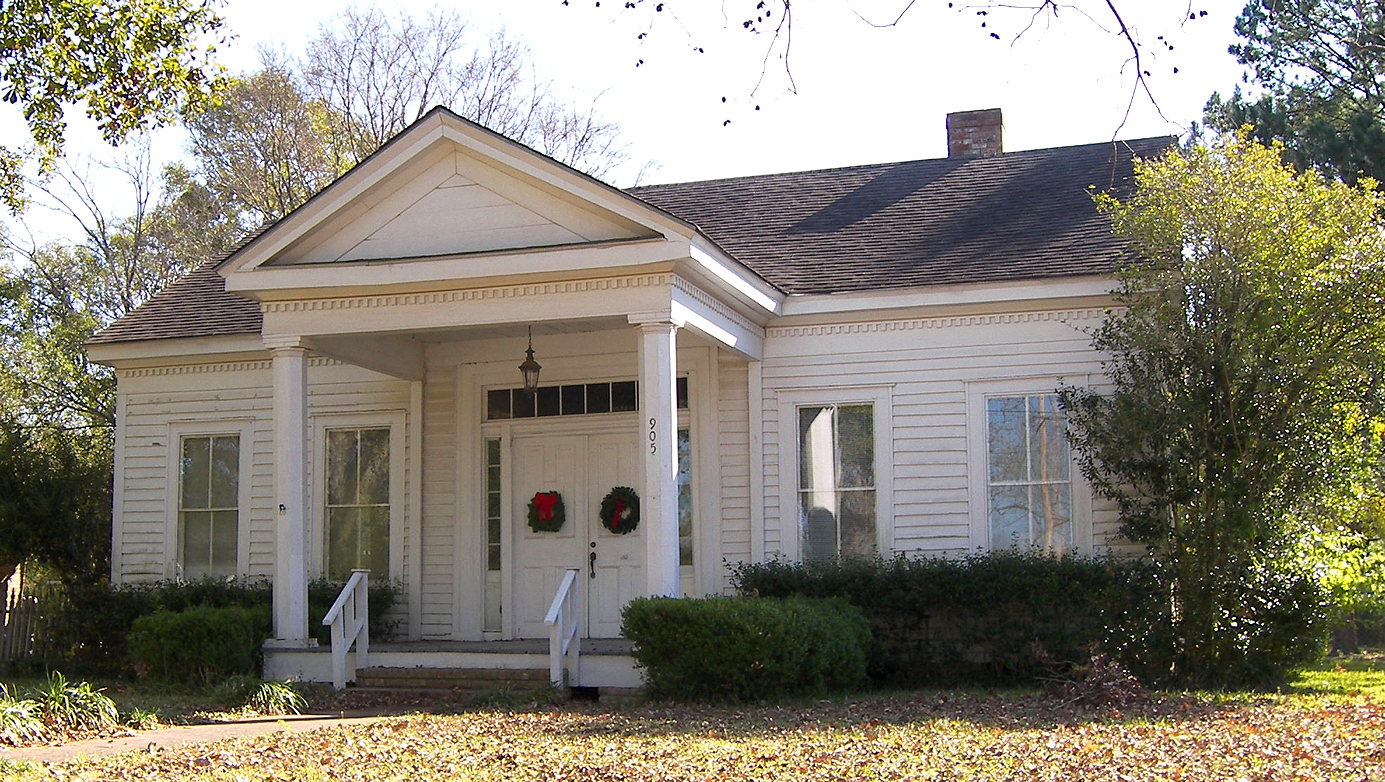
The Arnold-Simonton House, built in 1845, is a Recorded Texas Historic Landmark and was formerly listed on the National Register of Historic Places.

Fernland Historical Park

In 2012, the city established Fernland Historical Park to serve as a permanent location for some of the oldest remaining buildings and artifacts in Texas. A nonprofit group, Fernland, Inc., and Sam Houston State University assisted the city in restoring and relocating the buildings to the park.

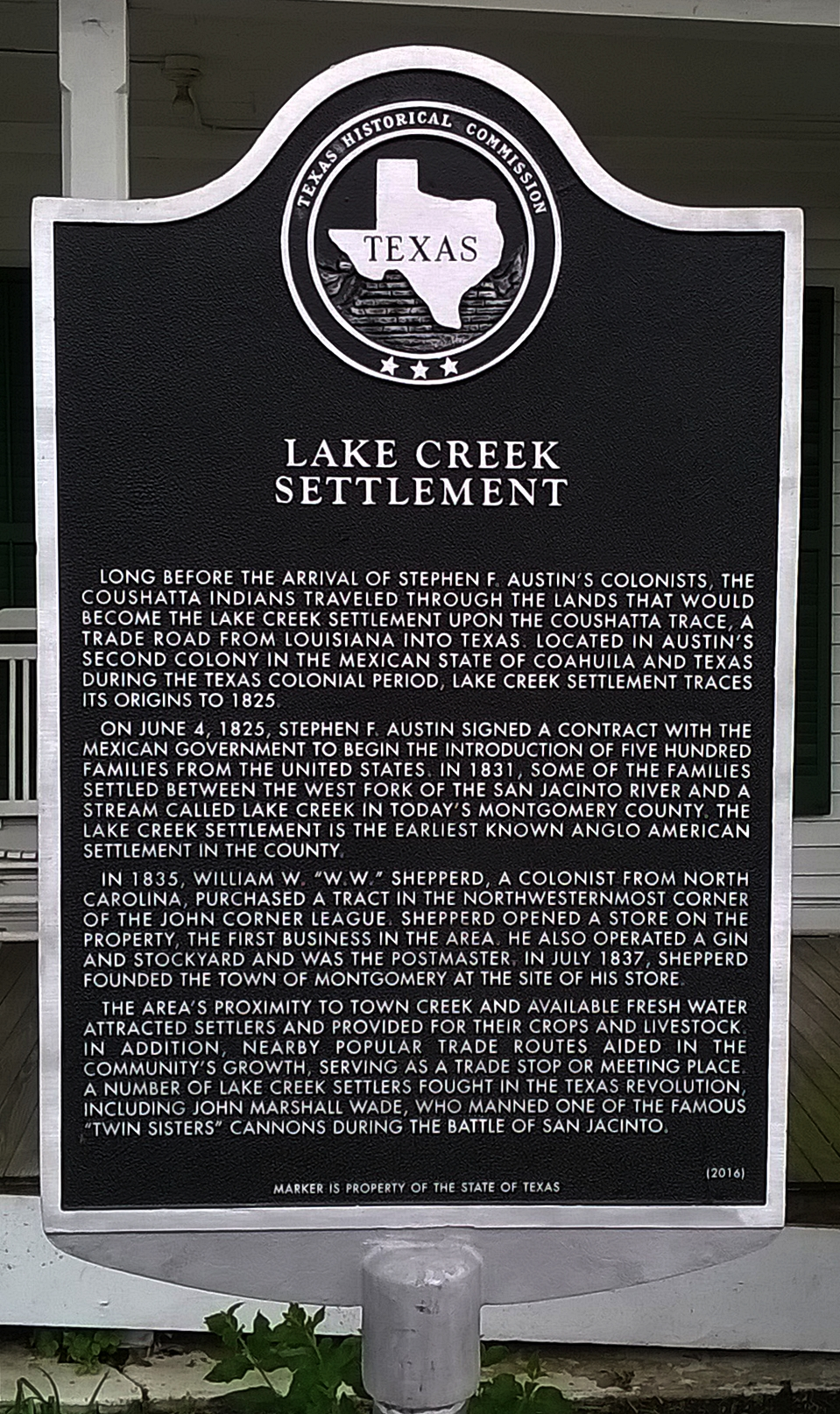
Texas Historical Commission marker approved for the Lake Creek Settlement located in front of the Nat Hart Davis Cottage, 308 Liberty Street, Montgomery, Texas

Historical markers

The city of Montgomery has buildings and other sites that date back to the original settlement of the area, such as Old Montgomery Cemetery, which contains the grave sites of some of Montgomery's first settlers. Historic buildings include the Davis Cottage and Museum, First State Bank, the Old Montgomery Baptist Church, and the Shelton-Smith House. Each site is designated with a historical marker established by the Texas Historical Commission. Texas Historical Commission markers inside the city limits include the most recent marker for the Lake Creek Settlement located in front of the Nat Hart Davis Cottage.

Westland Bunker

Ling-Chieh "Louis" Kung, the nephew of Soong Mei-ling, built an underground bunker in Montgomery, which was completed in 1982. Kung took money that he made from the success of the Westland Oil Development Corp. in the 1970s and used it to build the bunker, since he feared that the Soviet Union or the People's Republic of China would launch nuclear weapons towards the United States. Kung bought hundreds of acres of pasture on the outskirts of Montgomery and secretly began building the bunker. The two-story, 40,000 square feet (3,700 m^{2}) bunker could house at least 700 people; Kung intended to have the bunker house his employees, their families, and others in case of a two-month emergency. Melanie Trottmann of The Wall Street Journal stated that the bunker "was a source of intrigue and gossip for the town of Montgomery." After the oil bust in the 1980s, Kung lost the title to the property; Kung died in 1996. Trottman said that the bunker "sat frozen in time" until a group of investors bought the property. The facility, now called "Westland Bunker", serves as a data storage center for businesses. The facility also contains office space that corporations can use in the event of a disaster.

== Notable people ==
- Norm Branch, a Major League Baseball pitcher, in retirement served as a mail carrier in the Montgomery area.
- Kambri Crews, producer and publicist located in New York City, us the author of Burn Down the Ground: A Memoir in which Montgomery is prominently featured.
- Bailie Key, artistic gymnast
- Charles B. Stewart, a physician and statesman, was secretary to the executive of the Consultation, a provisional government established during the Texas Revolution. He served as a delegate at the Convention of 1836, signing the Texas Declaration of Independence. He also represented Montgomery County at the Convention of 1845, which drafted the Texas State Constitution, and served as Montgomery County's first representative in the Texas State Legislature*
- Trey Edward Shults, film director, producer, writer, and actor

== Climate ==
The climate in this area is characterized by hot, humid summers and generally mild to cool winters. According to the Köppen climate classification, Montgomery has a humid subtropical climate, Cfa on climate maps.
