= Texas Renaissance Festival =

Annual Renaissance fair in Texas

Coordinates: 30.259007°N 95.830646°W

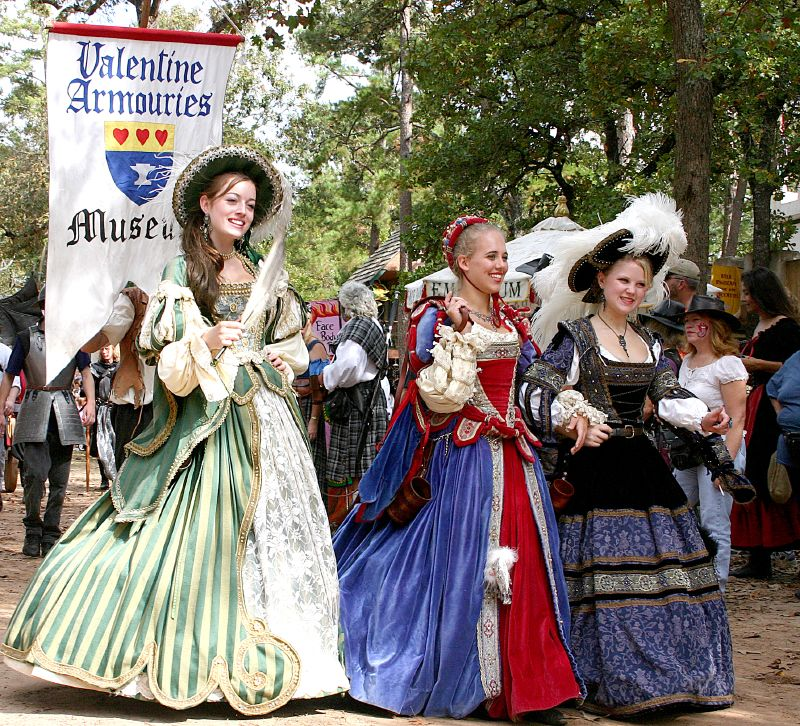
- Women in costume at the Texas Renaissance Festival
- Genre: Renaissance fair
- Dates: Eight weekends in October and November
- Locations: 21778 FM 1774 Todd Mission, Texas 77363
- Inaugurated: 1974
- Attendance: 678,550 (2016)
- Area: 70 acres (28 hectares)
- Stages: 25
- Website: www.texrenfest.com

The Texas Renaissance Festival (dubbed the Ren Fest) is an annual Renaissance fair located in Todd Mission, Texas, about 55 miles (89 km) northwest of Houston.

The Texas Renaissance Festival (TRF) started in 1974 on the location of an old strip mining site. As of 2017, the festival sits on 55 acres (22 hectares) of land, and offers over 200 acres (81 hectares) of camping facilities to patrons. The festival regularly draws over half a million guests annually, making it the largest Renaissance festival in the country by attendance.

== History ==
In 1974, the TRF was founded by two brothers, David and George Coulam, on an abandoned strip mining site in what is now Todd Mission, Texas. At the time, it spanned 15 acres (6 hectares), with three stages featuring small improv theatre groups, and merchants selling their goods on blankets. The opening year had an attendance of 33,000.

The fair has since grown to an annual attendance of over 500,000, with 400 vendors and 21 stages over eight weekends. A documentary series on the TRF and its ownership, Ren Faire, was produced in 2024 by HBO.

One of the brothers, George Coulam, served as the public face of the fair in the persona of "King George" every year until his passing early in 2025.

== Features ==
As of 2017, the TRF featured approximately 500 costumed actors who performed on 25 stages. Its 350 on-site shops included: international food purveyors; unique artisans; merchants and craft vendors; human-powered rides; an abundance of performers walking among the guests; and the Queen's Royal Finale (fireworks if weather permits) at dusk. The fair hosts over half a million visitors annually, which peaked at 679,000 in 2016.

=== Themed weekends ===
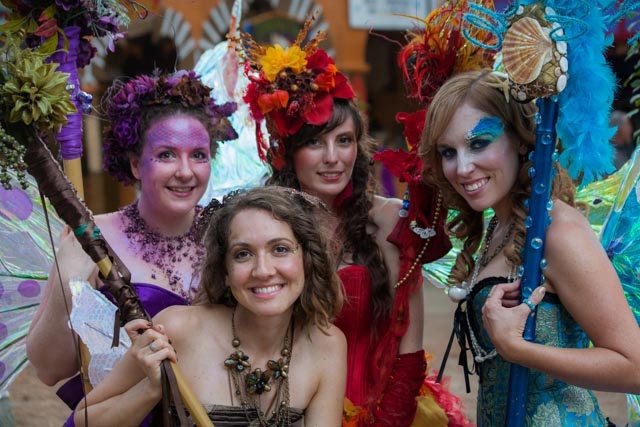
A group of fairies during the "1001 Dreams" weekend at the Texas Renaissance Festival.

Each of the weekends of the festival take on a different theme, influencing the performances, costumes, food, drink, art, shops, contests, and games throughout the festival grounds:

- Oktoberfest - German theme, including polka music and dancing, and the serving of traditional German beer.
- 1001 Dreams - Fantasy theme, encouraging lavish costumes of wizards, fairies, and elves and including several fantastical contests, such as scavenger hunts and costume contests.
- All Hallows Eve - Medieval Halloween theme, including spooky decorations and contests, such as jack-o-lantern carving contests, to celebrate the holiday.
- Pirate Adventure - Pirate theme, encouraging pirate costumes and including several sea-related games and contests.
- Roman Bacchanal - Roman theme, encouraging Roman costumes and hosting several Roman-themed contests and games such as toga contests and spaghetti eating contests. (Not featured in 2024.)
- Barbarian Invasion - Medieval Barbarian theme, encouraging costumes of medieval barbarians and including "barbaric" contests such as the "Barbarian Battle Cry" contest and eating contests.
- Heroes and Villains - Iconic figures of the past come to life.
- Highland Fling - Scottish theme, encouraging traditional Scottish costumes and including bagpipe-playing and traditional Scottish food and drink.
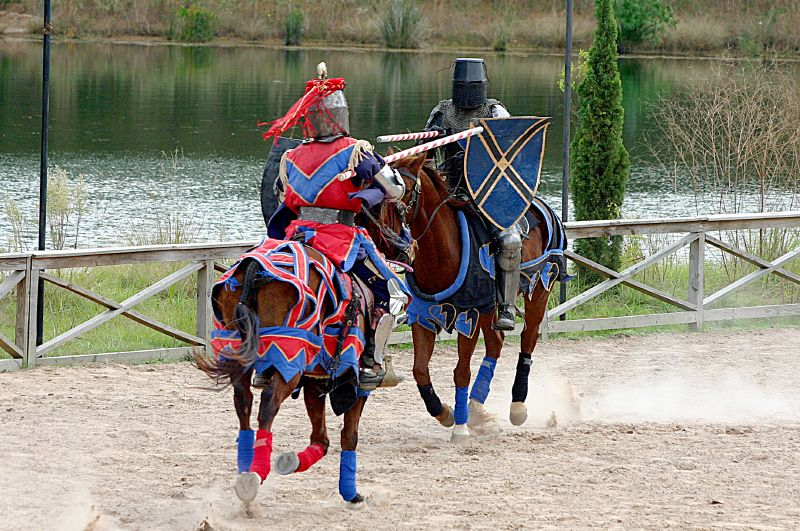
- The Joust at the Texas Renaissance Festival.
  Celtic Christmas - Christmas theme, including Christmas decorations and music, and featuring Christmas-themed contests such as "Candy Cane Hunt" and "Guess the Present" contests.

=== Performances ===
The festival grounds feature 25 stages, which host a wide variety of performances. The festival features several medieval-themed music and dance groups, including everything from belly dancing, to harps and fiddles, to bagpipes and accordions, to the carillon. Throughout the festival park several demonstrating artists can be found presenting the methods of various medieval trades, such as glassblowing, forging armor, candle-making, coin minting, and others to visitors.

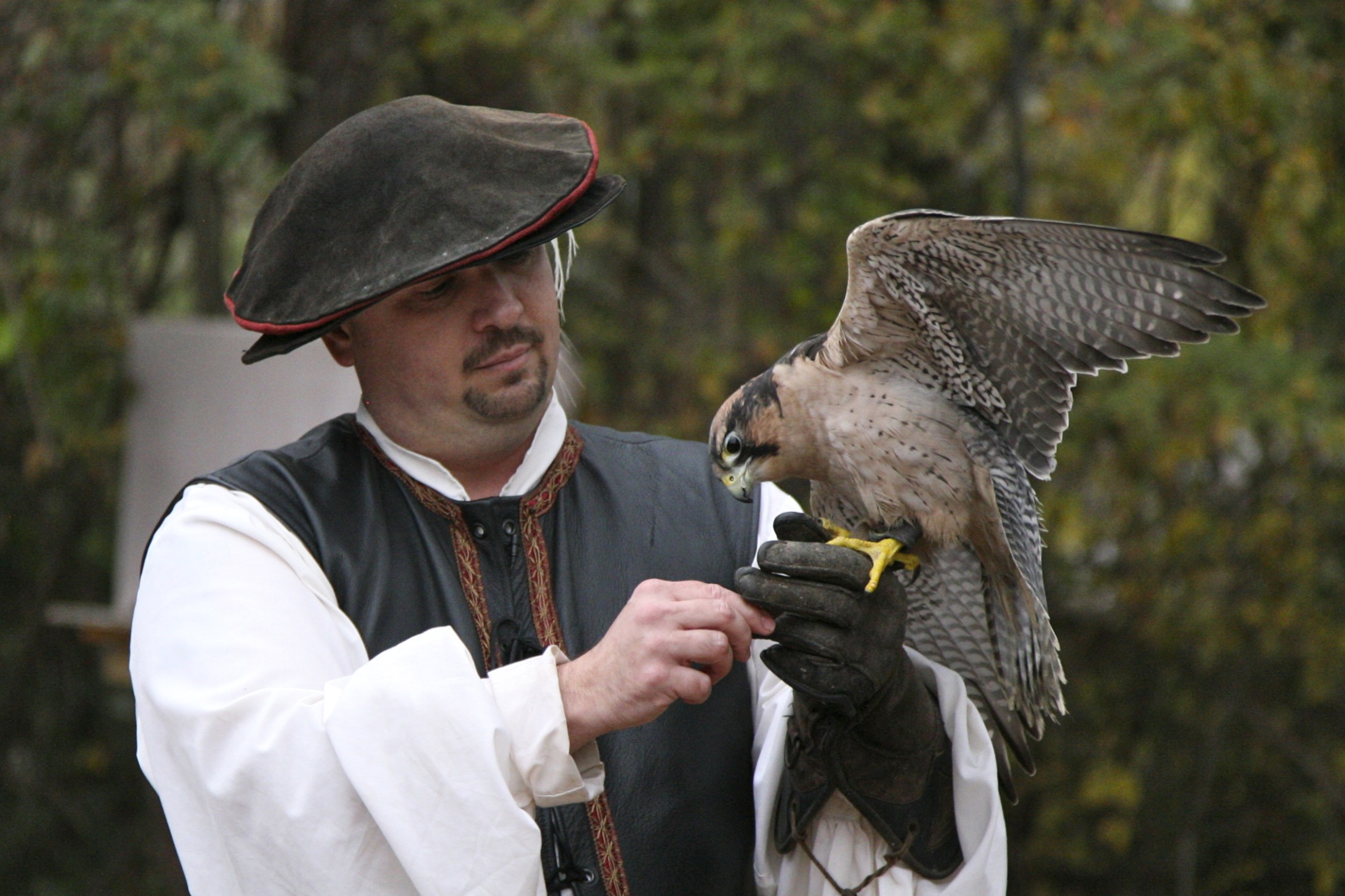
Birds of Prey at the Texas Renaissance Festival.

On the larger stages, other, grander events take place, the largest of which is the Joust. The Joust is performed by the Hanlon-Lees Action Theatre, and is an accurate reenactment of a medieval joust, featuring authentic weapons, costumed horses, and armored knights. Staple performances include The Birds of Prey show, a highly praised free-flying bird show including hawks, owls, vultures, and eagles, the Fire Whip Show, the Clan Tynker Family Circus, the Pride of Bedlam, and the School of Sword. Other performances at the festival include acts designed both for mature audiences only and also for youngsters.

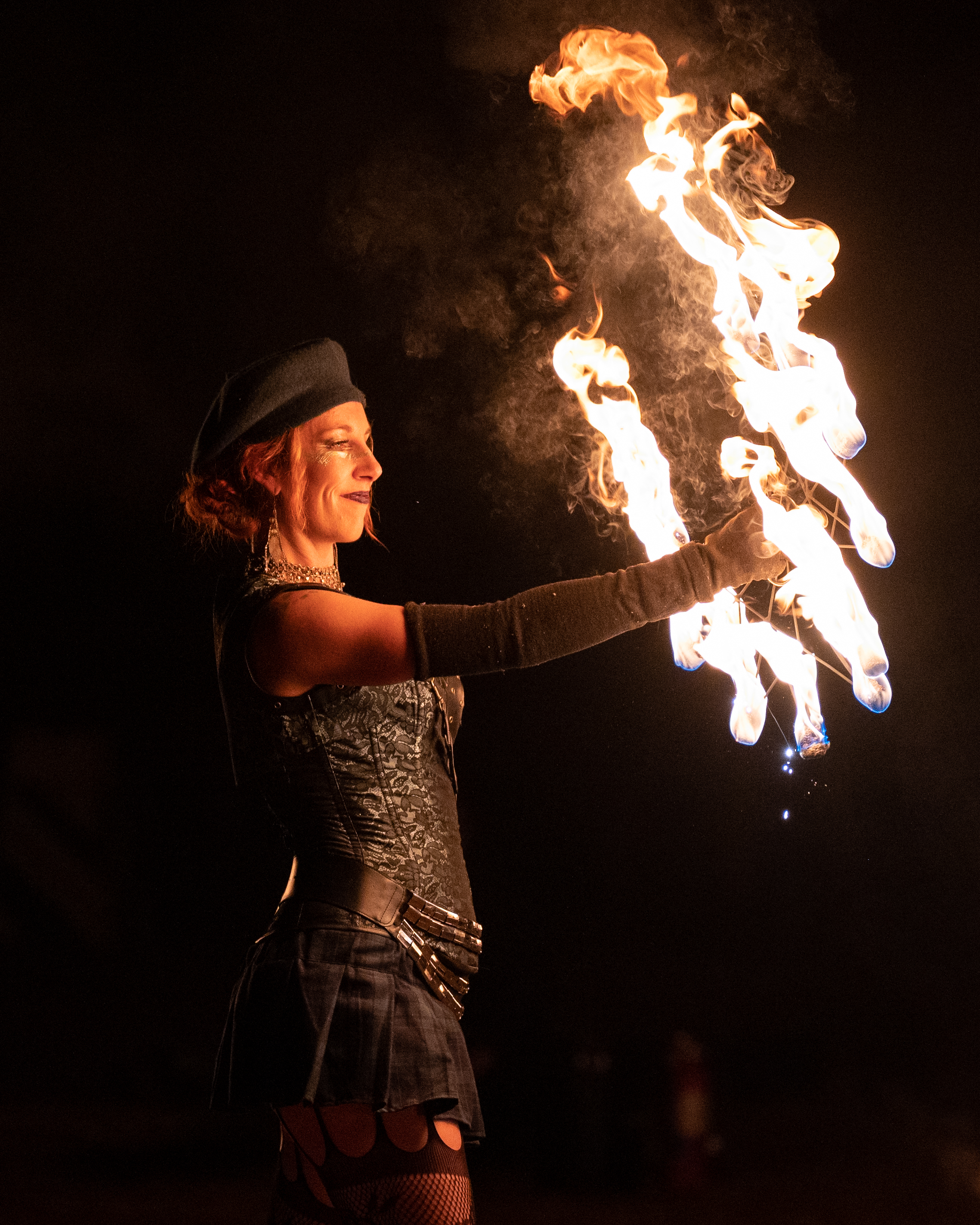
Solar Rain at the Texas Renaissance Festival.

At the end of the festival, a royal finale takes place in the arena, featuring performances from several of the entertainers and musicians, and closing with a fireworks presentation.

== See also ==
- List of Renaissance and Medieval fairs
- Renaissance Fair
- Ren Faire
