= Stoneham, Texas =

Unincorporated community in Texas, US

Stoneham
- Unincorporated Community
- Interactive map of Stoneham
- Location within Texas Location within the United States
- Coordinates: 30°20′31″N 95°54′45″W
- Country: United States
- State: Texas
- County: Grimes

Population (1970)
  - Total: 12

Stoneham is an unincorporated community in Grimes County, Texas, United States. The town was once a part of a colony operated by Stephen F. Austin and by 1900, the population grew to 250. Although a ghost town by 1970, the town has since grown in population.

== History ==
The site occupied by present-day Stoneham was first settled by members of Austin's colony. In the 1840s, a Methodist meeting house was constructed and later, after the American Civil War, a Baptist church was built. These buildings were the only public buildings until railroads were built in the town in 1879.

Later, farm families in the vicinity of Hurricane Creek began migrating onto a projected line of the Central and Montgomery Railway in 1879. In that same year, John H. Stoneham gave land for a railroad commission and the town was named "Stonehamville" after him in his honor. The name was later changed to "Stoneham" at an unknown date. In 1890, a total of thirty people lived in the town and by 1900, the town grew to 250 residents, most of which were of Polish descent. In 1932, however, the population dropped by about fifty residents after the town's business district was destroyed in a fire. After World War II, the town's population dropped to 100. During this time, three white and three black schools were operated by the Stoneham Common School District.

It now serves as the location of the Navasota Independent School District's High Point Elementary School.

=== Present day ===
In 1995, a Methodist church, the Stoneham Cemetery, and the Stoneham Community Center, were given Texas State Historical Markers.

== Geography ==
Stoneham is located approximately 59.6 miles (1 hour and 13 minutes) from Houston, 33.8 miles (39 minutes) from College Station, and 126 miles (2 hours and 26 minutes) from Austin.

== Ghost town ==
The town was almost abandoned by 1970, with only 12 permanent residents. By the 2000 census, the number remained unchanged. The census, however, did not include all of Stoneham's residents, as many did not claim to be permanent residents or were not as such at the time.
