= Todd Mission, Texas =

- City
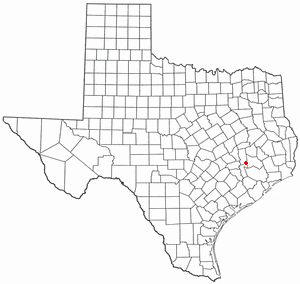
- Location of Todd Mission, Texas

- Location in Grimes County
- Coordinates: 30°15′40″N 95°49′47″W
- Country: United States
- State: Texas
- County: Grimes

Government
  - Mayor: Stephen Mensing

Area
  - Total: 2.01 sq mi (5.21 km^{2})
  - Land: 1.98 sq mi (5.14 km^{2})
  - Water: 0.027 sq mi (0.07 km^{2})
- Elevation: 285 ft (87 m)

Population (2020)
  - Total: 121
  - Density: 61.0/sq mi (23.5/km^{2})
- Time zone: UTC-6 (Central (CST))
  - Summer (DST): UTC-5 (CDT)
- Postal code: 77363
- Area code: 936
- FIPS code: 48-73224
- GNIS feature ID: 2412074
- Website: https://toddmissiontx.gov/

Todd Mission is a city in Grimes County, Texas, United States. It lies on Farm to Market Road 1774, fifty miles (80 km) northwest of Houston. Its population was 121 as of the 2020 census, up from 107 at the 2010 census. The city is home to the Texas Renaissance Festival.

== Geography ==
According to the United States Census Bureau, the city has a total area of 2.0 square miles (5.2 km^{2}), of which 0.03 sq mi (0.07 km^{2} or 45 acres), or 1.38%, is covered by water.

== Demographics ==
Historical population
Census	Pop.	Note	%±
1990	54		—
2000	146		170.4%
2010	107		−26.7%
2020	121		13.1%
U.S. Decennial Census; 2020 Census

=== 2020 census ===
As of the 2020 census, Todd Mission had a population of 121. The median age was 40.3 years, 22.3% of residents were under the age of 18, and 14.9% of residents were 65 years of age or older. For every 100 females there were 98.4 males, and for every 100 females age 18 and over there were 95.8 males age 18 and over.

0.0% of residents lived in urban areas, while 100.0% lived in rural areas.

There were 42 households in Todd Mission, of which 42.9% had children under the age of 18 living in them. Of all households, 45.2% were married-couple households, 16.7% were households with a male householder and no spouse or partner present, and 33.3% were households with a female householder and no spouse or partner present. About 23.8% of all households were made up of individuals and 0.0% had someone living alone who was 65 years of age or older.

There were 53 housing units, of which 20.8% were vacant. The homeowner vacancy rate was 2.8% and the rental vacancy rate was 21.4%.

Racial composition as of the 2020 census
Race	Number	Percent
White	85	70.2%
Black or African American	0	0.0%
American Indian and Alaska Native	1	0.8%
Asian	0	0.0%
Native Hawaiian and Other Pacific Islander	0	0.0%
Some other race	15	12.4%
Two or more races	20	16.5%
Hispanic or Latino (of any race)	37	30.6%

=== 2000 census ===
As of the 2000 census, 146 people, 56 households, and 33 families were residing in the city. The population density was 69.7 inhabitants per square mile (26.9/km^{2}). The 75 housing units had an average density of 35.8 per square mile (13.8/km^{2}). The racial makeup of the city was 80.82% White, 3.42% African American, and 15.75% from other races. Hispanics or Latinos of any race was 18.49% of the population.

Of the 56 households, 30.4% had children under 18 living in them, 44.6% were married couples living together, 5.4% had a female householder with no husband present, and 39.3% were not families; 25.0% of all households were made up of individuals, and 5.4% had someone living alone who was 65 or older. The average household size was 2.61 and the average family size was 3.21 persons.

In the city, the age distribution was 23.3% under 18, 8.9% from 18 to 24, 38.4% from 25 to 44, 23.3% from 45 to 64, and 6.2% 65 or older. The median age was 34 years. For every 100 females, there were 124.6 males. For every 100 females 18 and over, there were 128.6 males.

The median income for a household in the city was $40,313, and for a family was $40,750. Males had a median income of $24,583 versus $21,458 for females. The per capita income for the city was $16,309. There were 6.5% of families and 10.4% of the population living below the poverty line, including 18.2% of those under 18 and 33.3% of those over 64.

== Education ==
Todd Mission is served by the Navasota Independent School District. Its comprehensive high school is Navasota High School.

== Economy ==
Todd Mission is home to the renaissance fair with the largest annual attendance in the United States, the Texas Renaissance Festival.
