= Montgomery Independent School District =

School district in Texas, United States

Address
- 20774 Eva Street Montgomery, Texas, 77356; United States

District information
- Type: Public
- Motto: Our Standard is Excellence
- Grades: PK–12
- Established: March 16, 1925; 101 years ago
- Superintendent: Mark Ruffin
- Governing agency: Texas Education Agency
- Schools: 12
- NCES District ID: 4831260

Students and staff
- Enrollment: 9,861 (2024–2025
- Teachers: 624.5 (on an FTE basis)
- Staff: 1,168.9 (on an FTE basis)
- Student–teacher ratio: 15.8

Other information
- Website: www.misd.org

Montgomery Independent School District is a public school district based in Montgomery, Texas. The district's attendance zone includes the city of Montgomery, portions of Conroe, and the surrounding unincorporated area of Montgomery County.

For the 2024–2025 school year, the district received an B grade from the Texas Education Agency.

The district also participates in the Montgomery County JJAEP alternative education program, which is operated by Montgomery County in partnership with Conroe Independent School District.

== History ==
The first school was built in 1848. It was a two story building, with the second floor being for Montgomery Masonic Lodge No. 25 and the first floor being for Montgomery Academy.

In 1983, a fire broke at the what was at the time Montgomery High School along FM 149. There was new high school built that year and was opened in 1986. Students temporarily attended the junior high while the new school was being built.

At the May 17, 2016 Montgomery Independent School District Board of Trustees meeting, the following names were chosen for the new schools to be built using the bonds approved in 2015: Lake Creek High School, Oak Hills Junior High School, Keenan Elementary School, and Lincoln Elementary School (formerly Montgomery Intermediate School)

== Athletic facilities ==
There is a common athletic facility for the two high schools, Montgomery ISD Athletic Complex/Football Stadium. The scoreboard had a cost of $800,000.

== Budget ==
In 2018, Montgomery ISD initiated a hiring freeze to prevent layoffs. Over the 2018-2019 academic year, the district experienced a budget shortfall of around $6.9 million. The following 2019-2020 academic year, the District experienced another budget shortfall of $4.4 million. The annual budget is $85 million, as of the 2024-2025 academic year.

== Schools ==
=== High Schools (Grades 9-12) ===
- Montgomery High School (opened 1986)
- Lake Creek High School (opened 2018)

=== Middle Schools (Grades 6-8) ===
- Montgomery Junior High School
- Oak Hills Junior High School (opened 2017)

=== Elementary Schools (Grades K-5) ===
- Keenan Elementary School (opened 2017)
- Lincoln Elementary School (opened 2018)
  - The name originates from Lincoln High School (originally Lawson High School), a pre-desegregation school for black students.
- Stewart Creek Elementary School (opened 2003)
- Lone Star Elementary School (opened 2006)
- Madeley Ranch Elementary School (opened 2009)
- Montgomery Elementary School
- Creekside Elementary School (opened 2024)

=== Other Schools ===
The district also participates in the Montgomery County JJAEP alternative education program, which is operated by Montgomery County in partnership with Conroe Independent School District.
