= Tolerance =

Tolerance or toleration is the state of tolerating, or putting up with, conditionally.

== Economics, business, and politics ==
- Toleration Party, a historic political party active in Connecticut
- Tolerant Systems, the former name of Veritas Software
- Tolerance tax, a historic tax that was levied against Jews in Hungary

== Life sciences ==
- Desiccation tolerance, the ability of an organism to endure extreme dryness
- Drug tolerance or physiological tolerance, a decrease in the response to a substance due to previous exposure
  - Alcohol tolerance
  - Multidrug tolerance or antibiotic tolerance, the ability of a disease-causing microorganism to resist killing by antimicrobials
- Immune tolerance or immunological tolerance, by which the immune system does not attack an antigen
  - Central tolerance, a mechanism by which newly developing T cells and B cells are rendered non-reactive to self
  - Immune tolerance in pregnancy or gestational/maternal immune tolerance
- Low frustration tolerance, a concept in Rational Emotive Behavioral Therapy
- Pain tolerance, the maximum level of pain that a person is able to tolerate
- Shade tolerance, a plant's abilities to tolerate low light levels
- Disease tolerance or tolerance to infection - one of the mechanisms host organisms can use to fight against parasites, pathogens or herbivores that attack the host

== Physical sciences ==
- Engineering tolerance, permissible limit(s) of variation in an object
  - Tolerance analysis, the study of accumulated variation in mechanical parts and assemblies
  - Tolerance coning, a budget of all tolerances that affect a particular parameter
- Tolerance, a measure of multicollinearity in statistics
- Tolerance interval, a type of statistical probability
- Tolerance relation, a reflexive and symmetric binary relation in mathematics
- Tolerant sequence, in mathematical logic

== Other uses ==
- Paradox of tolerance, a paradox described by Karl Popper stating that if a society is tolerant without limit, its ability to be tolerant is eventually seized or destroyed by the intolerant
- Tolerance Monument, an outdoor sculpture near Goldman Promenade in Jerusalem
- Tolerance (film), a 2000 Brazilian drama film
- Tolerance (sculpture), a 2011 sculpture by Jaume Plensa

== See also ==
- Intolerance (disambiguation)
- Ontario Consultants on Religious Tolerance
- Toleration Act (disambiguation)
- Zero tolerance (disambiguation)
