= Buffalo Bayou Park =

Park in Houston, Texas, US

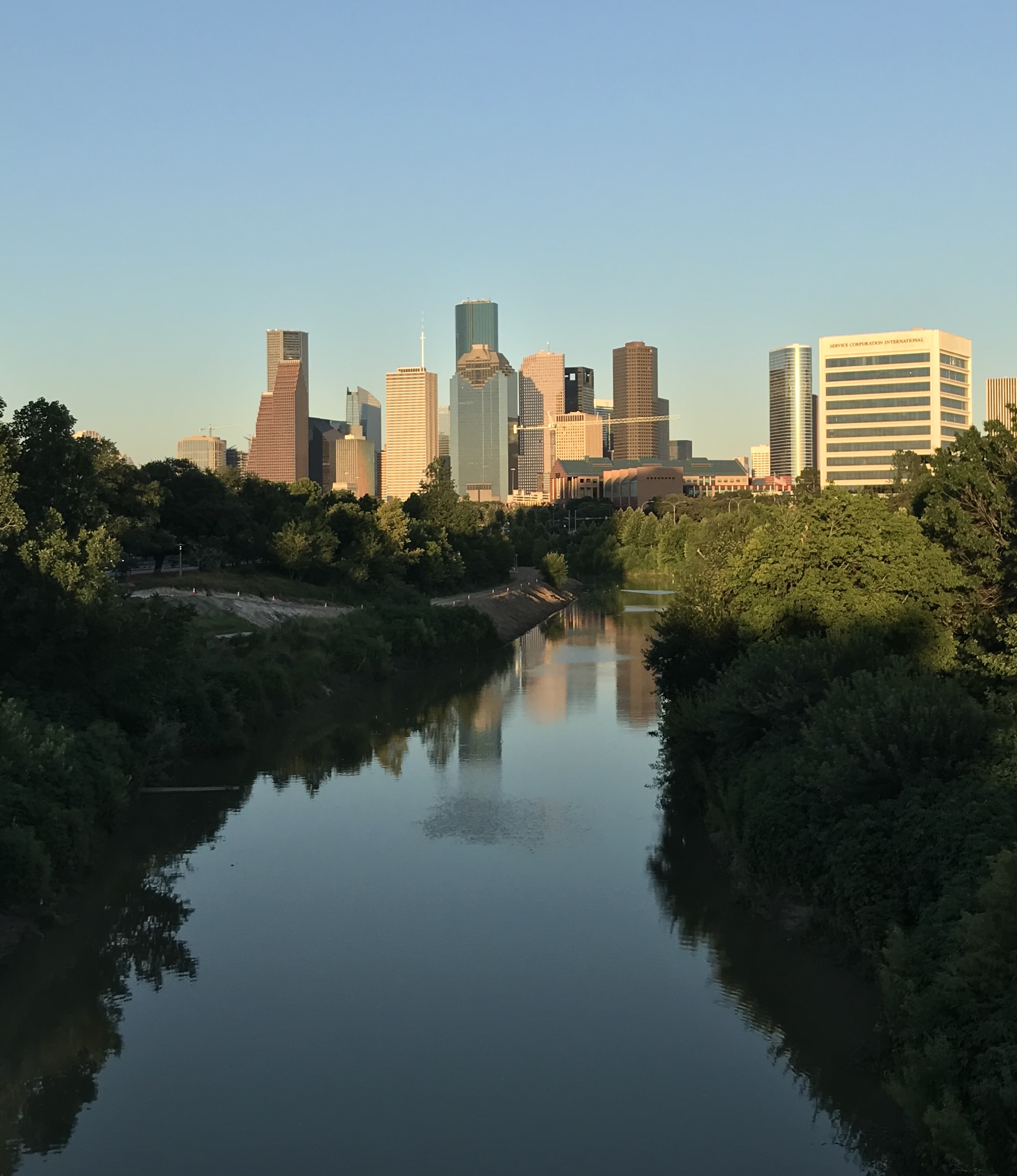
- Downtown Houston from Buffalo Bayou Park
- Interactive map of Buffalo Bayou Park
- Type: Linear park
- Location: Houston, Texas
- Coordinates: 29.761°N 95.384°W
- Area: 160 acres (0.65 km^{2})
- Opened: October 2015
- Operator: Buffalo Bayou Partnership P. Mirani
- Status: Open
- Website: Houston Parks and Recreation

Buffalo Bayou Park is a 2.3 mile long municipal park located along the banks of the Buffalo Bayou near Downtown Houston, Texas.

With a total area of 160 acres, Buffalo Bayou Park stretches from Shepherd Drive to Sabine Street, between Allen Parkway and Memorial Drive. Opened in 2015, the park features a variety of recreational activities including a skate park, picnic area, children's play area, dog park, cultural events hall, and miles of bike and hiking trails.

== History ==
The area now known as Buffalo Bayou Park was earmarked for parkland since the early 1900s. Throughout the first half of the 20th century, the City of Houston was gifted or outright purchased tracts of land around the Bayou with the intention of creating a city park. Due to increasing development, the land was subdivided into smaller parks, roadways, various public spaces and Interstate 45. Eventually, due to the presence of Allen Parkway to the south and Memorial Drive to the north, it became difficult for pedestrians to enter the park. During the 1950s, consistent flooding issues led the Army Corps of Engineers to strip the banks of vegetation and straighten the Bayou in order to allow floodwaters to easily pass through. The project failed to improve drainage as the lack of trees caused brush to grow and impede the flow of water.

In 2011, the city entered an agreement with the Buffalo Bayou Partnership to develop and renovate the site. The $50 million renovation project was financed by a series of private donations, including a $30 million from the Kinder Foundation, with some public funding. Eleanor Tinsley Park, which is now a section of Buffalo Bayou Park was also renovated during the same project. The updated park was officially opened in October 2015.

== Attractions ==
=== Tolerance public art installation ===
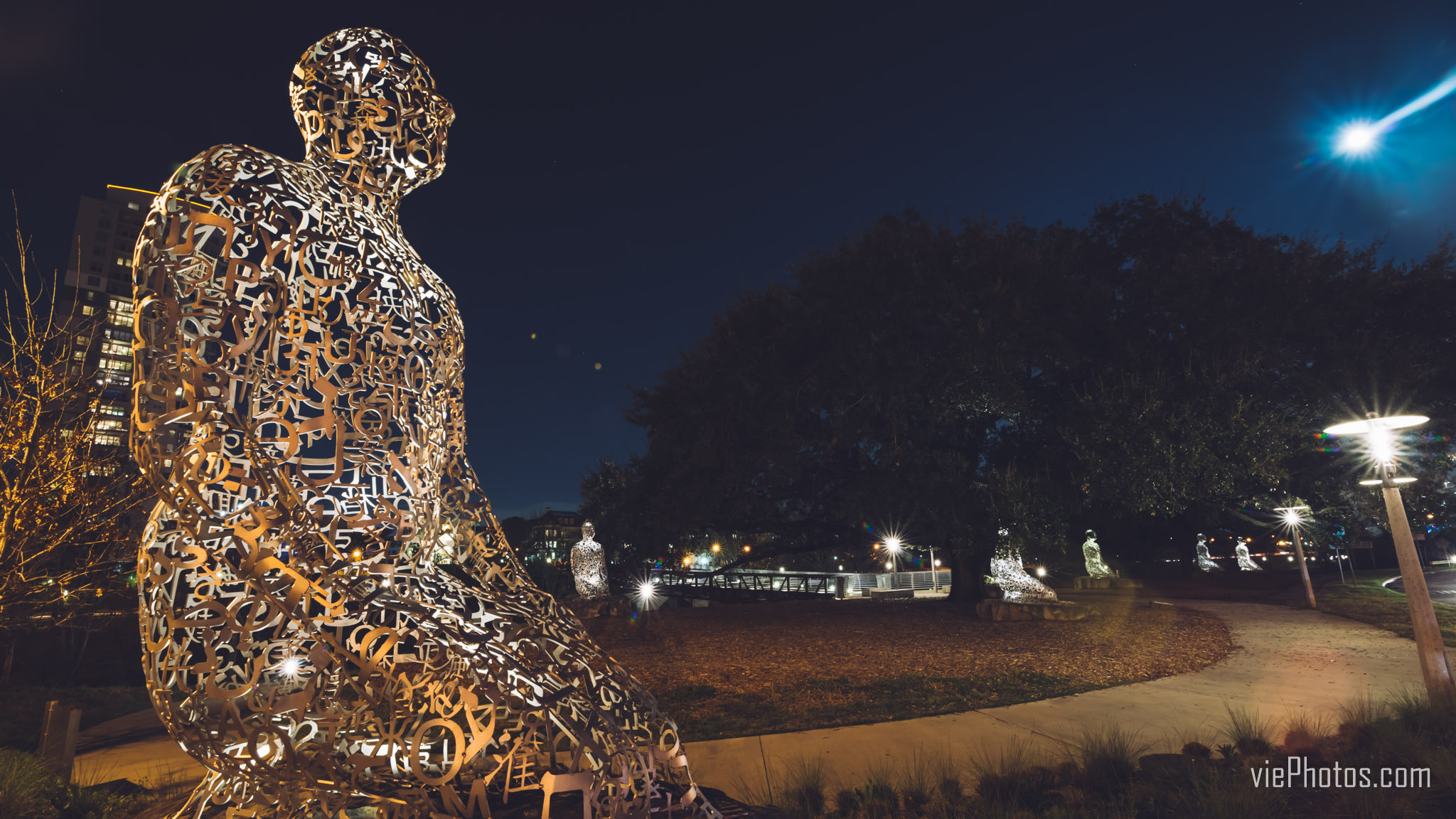
Tolerance sculpture by Jaume Plensa

Along Harmony Walk, leading to Rosemont Bridge, are seven figures that make up the Tolerance sculpture created by Jaume Plensa. The sculpture celebrates Houston as a city of tolerance and diversity.

=== Johnny Steele Dog Park ===
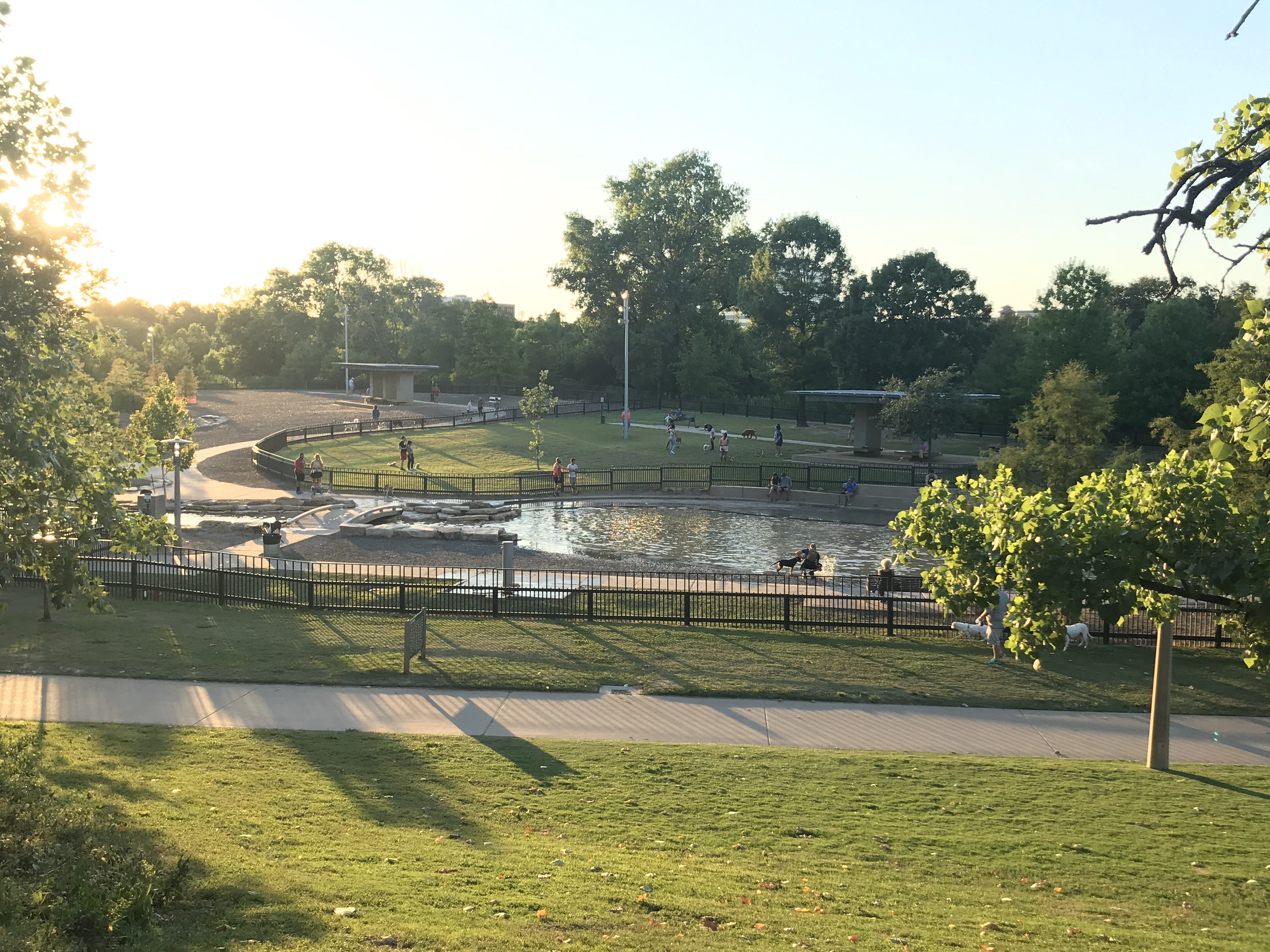
Johnny Steele Dog Park

Named after Houston architect, Johnny Steele, the dog park opened in January 2015. The 2-acre park consists of separate play areas for large and small dogs, a pond where dogs can swim freely, and dog washing areas. Due to its proximity to the Bayou, it is designed to handle periods of flooding from storms.

=== Lee and Joe Jamail Skatepark ===
The 30,000 square foot skate park is named after Houston attorney Joe Jamail. Completed in 2008 at a cost of $2.7 million and renovated in 2016, the world-class skate park has hosted a variety of events and competitions.

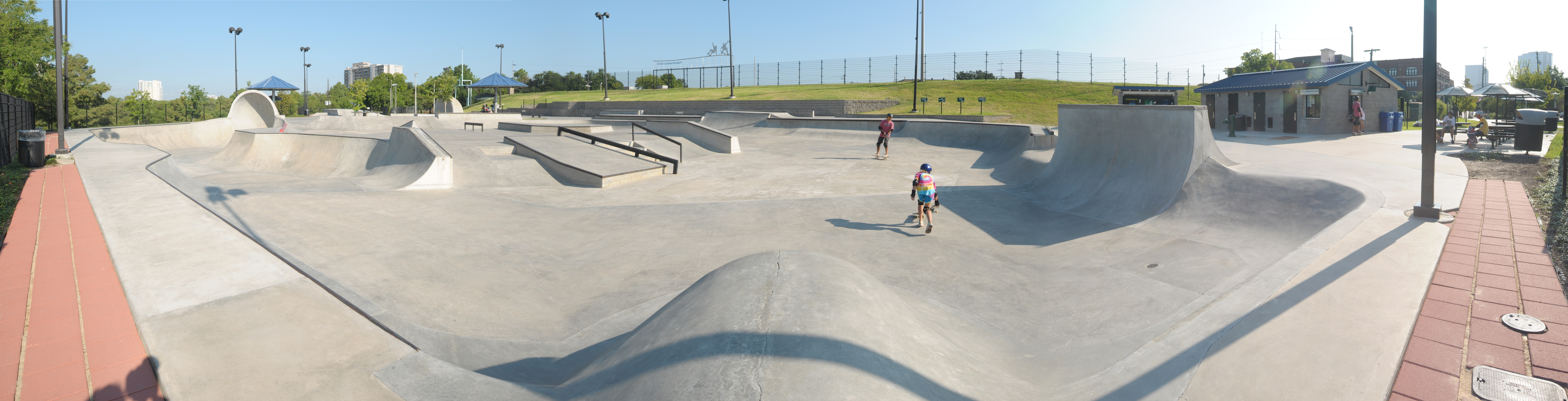
Lee and Joe Jamail Skatepark

=== Barbara Fish Daniel Nature Play Area and Picnic Pavilion ===
Located near the skatepark, the Barbara Fish Daniel Nature Play Area and Picnic Pavilion includes a boulder rock scramble, a stream and waterfall, a sandpit, climbing logs and stones and a slide. It features a tree house with a climbing net and a picnic pavilion that can be rented out for events such as birthday parties.

=== The Cistern ===
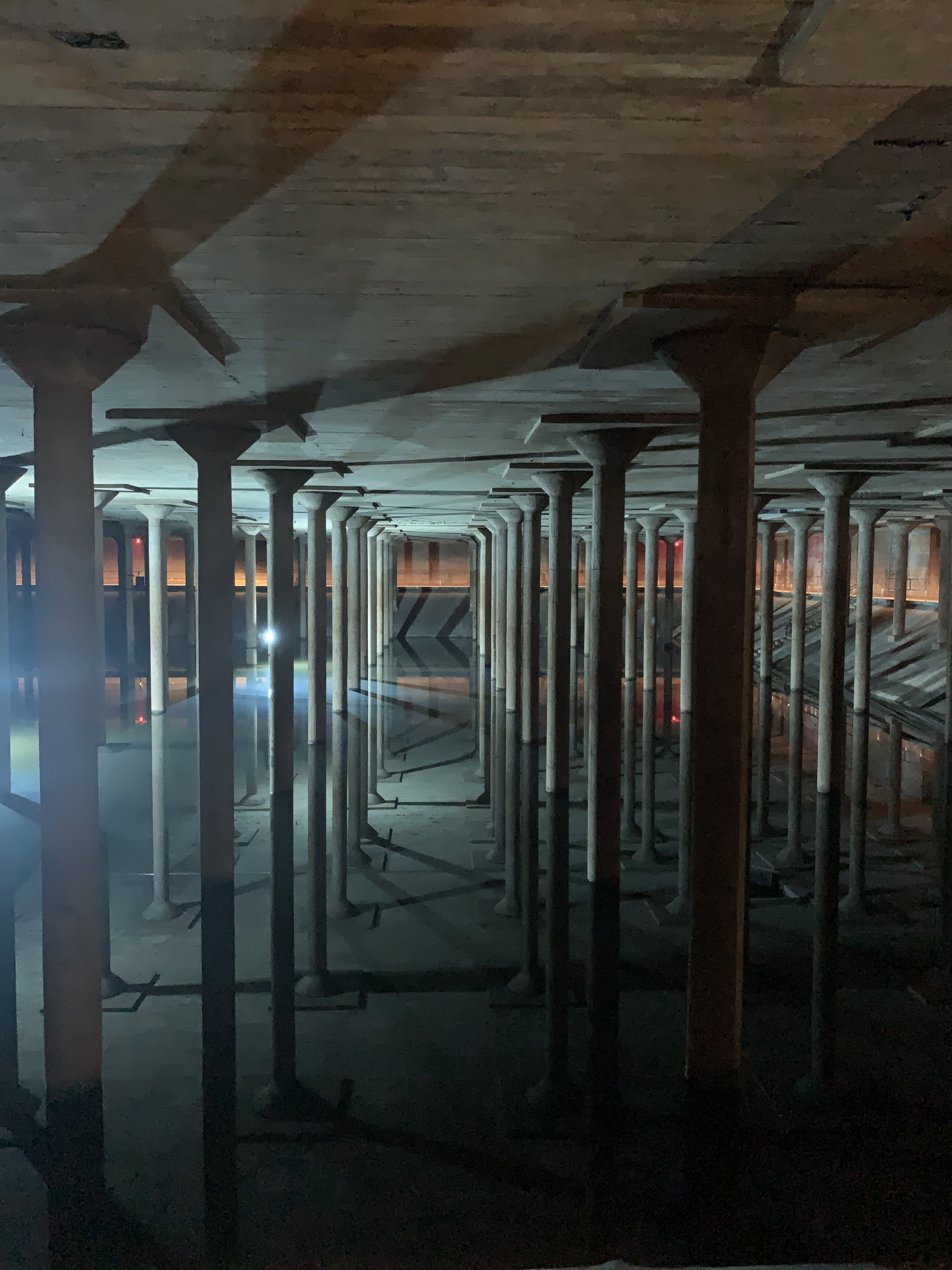
The Cistern

The Cistern is a 87,500 square foot public space for visual art and sound installations. Once a water reservoir for the City of Houston, the structure was decommissioned in 2007 due to an irreparable water leak. In 2010, Houston architecture and engineering firm, Page, transformed the historic reservoir into an ultra minimalist, safe, and accessible attraction. The Cistern opened in May 2016, and the first art exhibit debuted in December 2016.

=== Other features ===
- Eleanor Tinsley Park
- Waugh Bridge Bat Colony
- Lost Lake
- Houston Police Officer's Memorial
- Tapley Tributary
