= Zero-tolerance policies in schools =

School policy

A zero-tolerance policy in schools is a policy of strict enforcement of school rules against behaviors or the possession of items deemed undesirable. In schools, common zero-tolerance policies concern physical altercations, as well as the possession or use of illicit drugs or weapons. Students, and sometimes staff, parents, and other visitors, who possess a banned item for any reason are always (if the policy is followed) punished. Public criticism against such policies has arisen because of the punishments the schools mete out when students break the rules in ignorance, by accident, or under extenuating circumstances. The policies have also been criticized for their connection to educational inequality in the United States.

In the United States and Canada, zero-tolerance policies have been adopted in various schools and other educational platforms. Zero-tolerance policies in the United States became widespread in 1994, after federal legislation would withhold all federal funding from states that did not expel students for one year if they bring a firearm to school.

== History ==
The use of the term zero-tolerance began with the Gun-Free Schools Act of 1994, when Congress made federal funding of public schools conditional upon the adoption of zero-tolerance policies for firearm possession. Similar policies of intolerance, coupled with expulsions for less serious behaviors than bringing a weapon to school, had long been a part of private, and particularly religious, schools.

The use of zero-tolerance policies in public schools increased dramatically after the Columbine High School massacre in 1999, with principals declaring that safety concerns made them want zero-tolerance for weapons. These rules led to disproportionate responses to minor or technical transgressions. Cases that attracted international media attention cases include students being suspended or expelled for offenses such as possession of over-the-counter and/or prescription drugs on campus with the permission of the students’ parents, keeping various pocketknives in cars, and carrying woodworking tools outside of a wood shop classroom. In Seal v. Morgan, a Tennessee student was expelled because someone else's knife was found in his car on school property, despite his protestations that he was unaware of the knife's presence; in 2000, the courts struck down the expulsion as having no rational basis. In some jurisdictions, zero-tolerance policies have come into conflict with freedom of religion rules already in place allowing students to carry, for example, kirpans.

In the "kids for cash" scandal, judge Mark Ciavarella, who promoted a platform of zero-tolerance, received kickbacks for constructing a private prison that housed juvenile offenders, and then proceeded to fill the prison by sentencing children to extended stays in juvenile detention for offenses as minimal as mocking a principal on Myspace, scuffles in hallways, trespassing in a vacant building, and shoplifting DVDs from Walmart. Critics of zero-tolerance policies argue that harsh punishments for minor offenses are normalized. The documentary Kids for Cash, interviews experts on adolescent behavior, who argue that the zero-tolerance model has become a dominant approach to policing juvenile offenses after the Columbine shooting.

In New York City, Carmen Fariña, head of the New York City Department of Education, restricted school suspension by principals in 2015. The Los Angeles Unified school board, responsible for educating 700,000 students, voted in 2013 to ban suspensions for "willful defiance", which had mostly been used against students from racial minorities. A year later, the same school district decided to decriminalize school discipline so that minor offenses would be referred to school staff rather than prosecuted. The previous approach had resulted in black students being six times more likely to be arrested or given a ticket than white students. The district saw suspensions drop by 53%, and graduation rates rise by 12%.

=== Media attention ===
Media attention has proven embarrassing to school officials, resulting in changes to state laws as well as to local school policies. One school board member gave this reason for changes his district made to their rigid policy: "We are doing this because we got egg on our face."

- A student at Sandusky High School in Sandusky, Ohio, was suspended for 90 days and failed, after school authorities searched him for drugs in September 1999, and found a broken pocket knife. He had used the knife to clean his golfing cleats.
- The Christina School District in Newark, Delaware, has experienced multiple highly publicized cases of zero-tolerance:
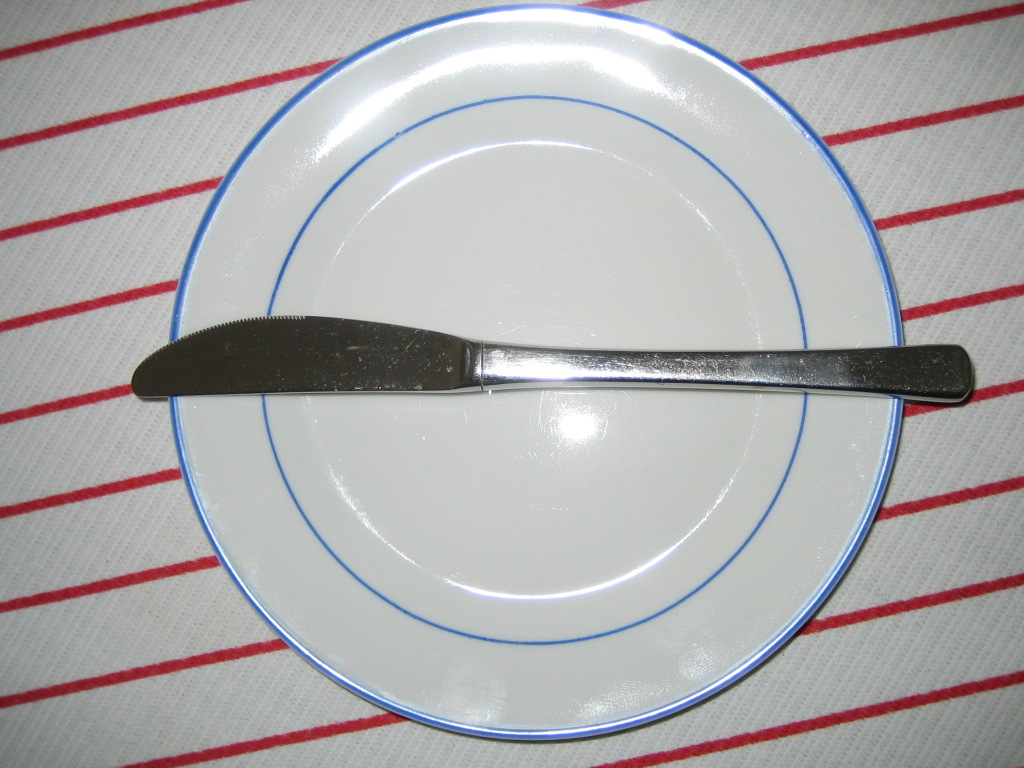
  - Students were punished for bringing ordinary dinner knives, which are not sharp, to school.
    After bringing a Cub Scouts dinner knife to school to eat his lunch, a six-year-old boy was ordered to attend an alternative school for students with behavioral problems for nine weeks. After a media uproar, the school board voted unanimously to reduce punishments for kindergartners and first-graders who take weapons to school to a mandatory suspension of three to five days, retaining the original definition of "weapons" that includes normal eating utensils.
  - Kasia Haughton, running for fifth-grade mayor at the Leasure Elementary School in Newark, Delaware was suspended and faced possible expulsion after coming to school with a knife to cut a cake. School officials were called in to investigate the incident, and referred to the knife as a "deadly weapon."
  - Other cases include a straight-A student who was ordered to attend "reform school" after a classmate dropped a pocket knife in his lap, and in 2007, when a girl was expelled for using a utility knife to cut paper for a project.
- Earlier in 2009, an Eagle Scout in New York was suspended for 20 days for having an emergency supply kit in his car that included a pocket knife.
- A second-grader in Baltimore, Maryland, was suspended in March 2013 for biting a Pop-Tart into the shape of a mountain, which school officials mistook for a gun. This resulted in the proposal of the "Reasonable School Discipline Act of 2013" in Maryland (SB 1058) and the "Toaster Pastry Gun Freedom Act" (HB 7029 and SB 1060) in Florida.
- Ahmed Mohamed, a student at MacArthur High School in Irving, Texas, was suspended for a week in September 2015 after he put a digital alarm clock in a pencil box, and took it to his school to show a teacher. When the device beeped while in one class, the student was suspended and detained on suspicion of creating a hoax bomb.
- In the Escondido school knives case, Brian Cappelletti and another student in San Diego were suspended from school for between 2 and 3 weeks and faced criminal charges and possible expulsion after knives were found in their vehicles parked outside their Escondido high school.

== Research ==
There is no concrete evidence that zero-tolerance reduces violence or drug abuse by students. Furthermore, school suspension and expulsion result in a number of negative outcomes for both schools and students. The American Bar Association finds that the evidence indicates that minority children are the most likely to suffer the negative consequences of zero-tolerance policies. Analysis of the suspension rate of students shows that black females and other racial minorities are suspended at a greater rate. The American Psychological Association concluded that the available evidence does not support the use of zero-tolerance policies as defined and implemented, that there is a clear need to modify such policies, and that the policies create a number of unintended negative consequences, including making schools "less safe".

In 2014, a study of school discipline figures was conducted. It was found that suspensions and expulsions as a result of zero-tolerance policies have not reduced school disruptions. The study's author stated that "zero-tolerance approaches to school discipline are not the best way to create a safe climate for learning". Zero-tolerance policies are sometimes viewed as a quick fix solution for student problems. While this seems like a simple action-reaction type of situation, it often leaves out the mitigating circumstances that are often the important details in student incidents. Even civilian judges consider mitigating circumstances before passing judgment or sentencing. If zero-tolerance policies were applied in adult courtroom scenarios, they would be fundamentally unjust and unconstitutional due to neglecting the laws involving due process, along with cruel and unusual punishments.

== Advocacy ==
Proponents of punishment- and exclusion-based philosophy of school discipline policies claim that such policies are required to create an appropriate environment for learning. This rests on the assumption that strong enforcement can act as a psychological deterrent to other potentially disruptive students.

The policy assumption is that inflexibility is a deterrent because, no matter how or why the rule was broken, the fact that the rule was broken is the basis for the imposition of the penalty. This is intended as a behavior modification strategy: since those at risk know that it may operate unfairly, they may be induced to take even unreasonable steps to avoid breaking the rule. This is a standard policy in rule- and law-based systems around the world on "offenses" as minor as traffic violations to major health and safety legislation for the protection of employees and the environment.

Disciplinarian parents view zero-tolerance policies as a tool to fight corruption. Under this argument, if subjective judgment is not allowed, most attempts by the authorized person to encourage bribes or other favors in exchange for leniency are clearly visible.

== Criticism ==
Critics of zero-tolerance policies in schools say they are part of a school-to-prison pipeline that over-polices children with behavioral problems, treating their problems as criminal justice issues rather than educational and behavioral problems. Students that may previously have been given short school suspensions before the implementation of policies are now sent to juvenile courts.

Critics of zero-tolerance policies frequently refer to cases where minor offenses have resulted in severe punishments. Typical examples include the honor-roll student being expelled from school under a "no weapons" policy while in possession of nail clippers, or for possessing "drugs" like cough drops and dental mouthwash or "weapons" like rubber bands.

A related criticism is that zero-tolerance policies make schools feel like a jail or a prison. Furthermore zero-tolerance policies have been struck down by U.S. courts and by departments of education.

Another criticism is that the zero-tolerance policies have actually caused schools to turn a blind eye to bullying, resulting in them refusing to solve individual cases in an attempt to improve their image. The zero-tolerance policy also punishes both the attacker and the defender in a fight, even when the attacker was the one who started the fight unprovoked. In 2017, the Georgia Supreme Court ruled that public schools within Georgia could not have a zero-tolerance policy for violence that does not allow for self-defense.

A particularly dismaying hypothesis about zero-tolerance policies is that they may actually discourage the reporting of violent behaviour, for fear of punishment, losing relationships, and for many other reasons. Ironically, zero-tolerance policies may be ineffective in the very purpose for which they were originally designed.

Durham University discovered that zero-tolerance schools have trouble enforcing policies on sexual assault and that it was tolerated by both students and staff. It was also found that a school with a stronger approach had one of the most frequent rates of sexual assault compared to the other schools in the study.

As schools develop responses to online bullying, schools that have overly harsh approaches to zero-tolerance policies may increasingly police speech of students in their own time that would normally be protected by free speech laws.

The American Bar Association opposes "zero-tolerance policies that mandate either expulsion or referral of students to juvenile or criminal court, without regard to the circumstances or nature of the offense or the students [sic] history."

Critics of zero-tolerance policies also argue that the large numbers of students who are suspended and expelled from school experience negative effects, which can prohibit them from finishing high school. Students who experience suspension, expulsion and arrests pay higher psychological and social costs such as depression, suicidal thoughts, and academic failure, and run the risk of being incarcerated as adults. In a study by Forrest et al., (2000), psychologists identified that a third of youths in juvenile detention centers were diagnosed with depression shortly after being incarcerated. In addition to being diagnosed with depression many youths found themselves having suicidal thoughts (Gnau et al. 1997).

Research found that black, Latino, and white adults with low educational attainment risked a higher propensity of being incarcerated in their lifetime (Pettit & Western 2010). The same study found that the incarceration rate in 2008 was 37% and had risen since the 1980s. That showed that incarceration rates of people with low levels of education were continuing to rise and that students were not completing their high school requirements.

According to kidsdata.org, 21,638 students were suspended and 592 students were expelled from San Diego County schools in 2012. A total of 10.1% of students did not complete their high school diploma.

== Reforms and alternatives to zero-tolerance policies ==
The American Psychological Association (APA) assembled a Zero-Tolerance Task Force in 2008 that reviewed data and extensive literature on zero-tolerance policies and their effect on student behavior. It concluded that zero-tolerance policies do not support child development nor improve school climate or school safety. The APA made several recommendations to reform zero-tolerance policies for serious infractions.

- One reform introduced by the APA was for school staff to consider teacher expertise and allow for greater flexibility when applying zero-tolerance policies. According to the APA, professional school staff need greater discretion when applying zero-tolerance policies because they are often the best mediators when evaluating infractions.
- Similarly, the APA recommended that all offenses be defined and that school officials be adequately trained to handle each offense. The APA affirmed that adequate teacher training will (1) protect teachers from being wrongfully accused of how they applied their school policy and (2) protect students from unfair repercussions.
- Another reform presented by the APA was for schools to evaluate their disciplinary prevention strategies. The APA maintained that schools, after evaluating their existing interventions and programs, would have strategies that have a positive effect on student behavior and school climate.

For less severe infractions, the American Psychological Association (APA) provided alternatives to zero-tolerance policies to ensure that students are not denied their opportunity to learn.

- The APA encouraged schools to implement preventive strategies that foster student support and a sense of community as an alternative to zero-tolerance policies. In particular, the APA asserted that research-supported preventive strategies improve the school climate and sense of community in schools, whereas zero-tolerance policies result in immediate punishment.
- For students who consistently engage in disruptive behavior, the APA recommended that schools design a list of effective alternatives they can use with students. The APA discussed various options that schools can implement to decrease disruptive behavior, including restorative justice, alternative programs, and community service.
- The APA also promoted increasing culturally relevant training available to teachers. According to the APA, this strategy is important for teachers to integrate culturally responsive management and instruction in their classrooms and, therefore, reduce the disproportionate amount of disciplinary referrals to maximize student learning.

== See also ==
- Juvenile Law Center
- School district drug policies
- Gun-Free School Zones Act of 1990
- School disturbance laws
- Zero-defects mentality, a similar policy used in the military
- In re Gault
