= School discipline =

Types of disciplinary actions used by schools against students

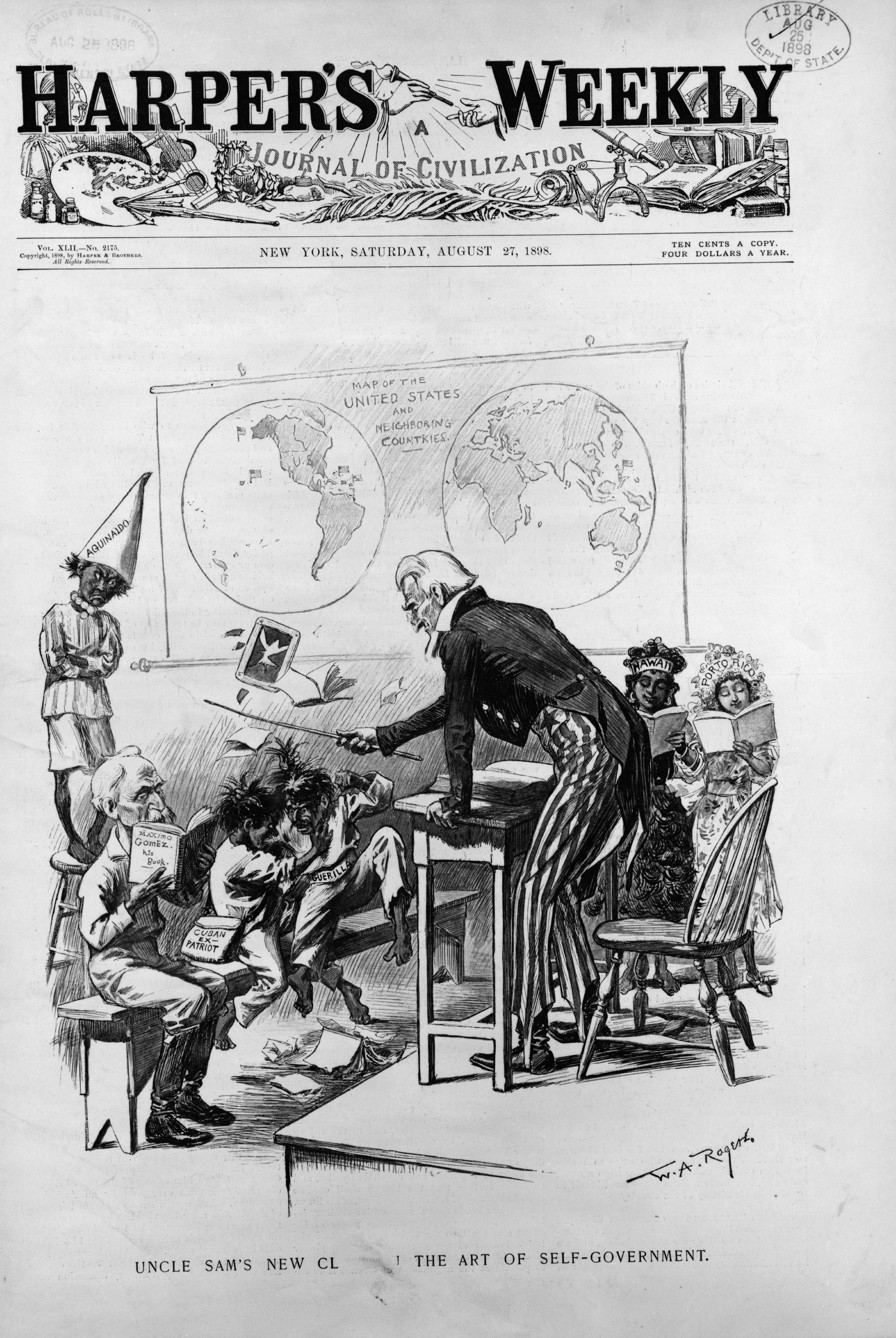
A Harper's Weekly cover from 1898 shows a caricature of school discipline.

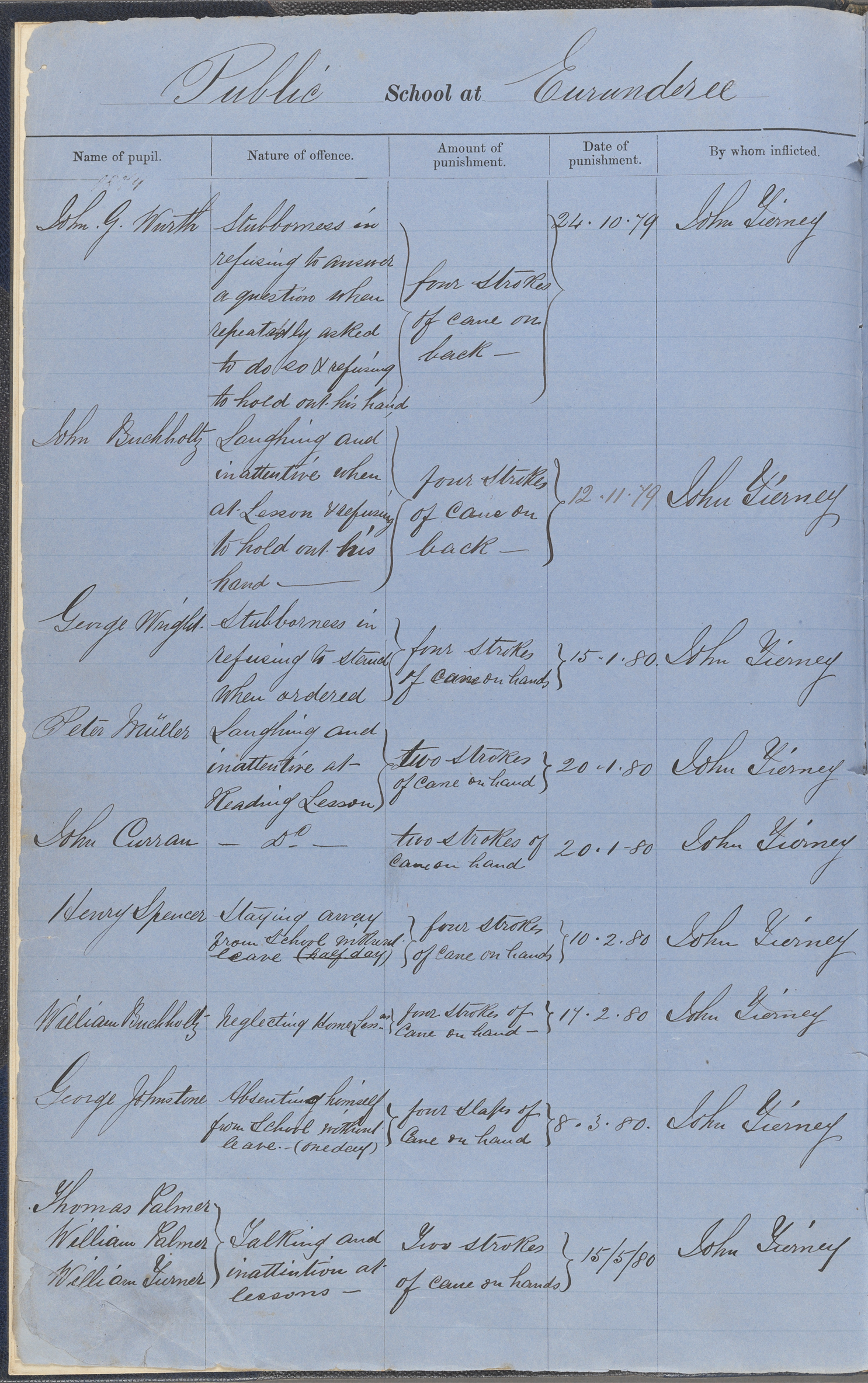
This Punishment Book, from the school attended by Henry Lawson, is one of the earliest surviving examples of this type of record.

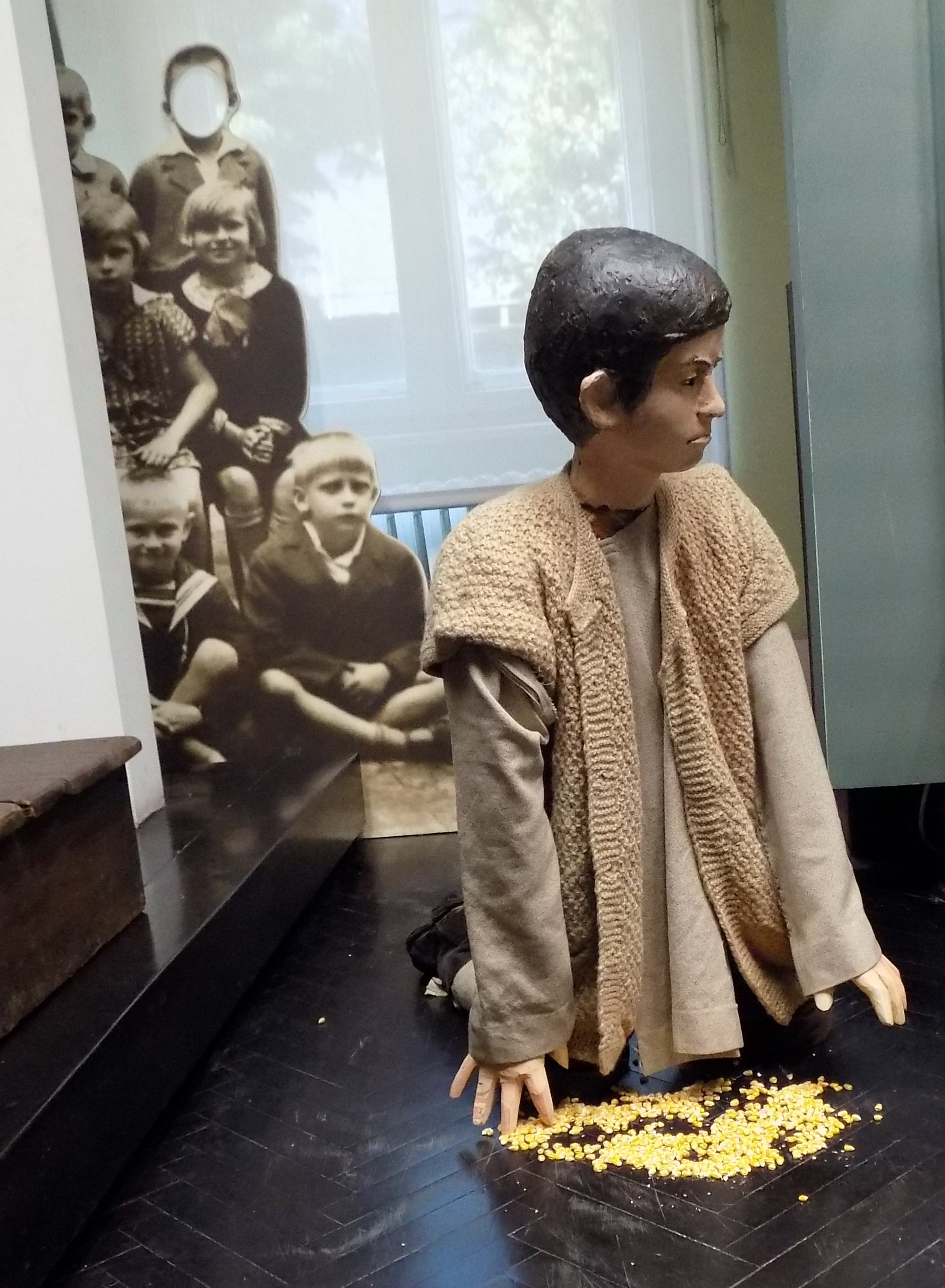
Kneeling on corn - the most common way of punishing students in schools in Serbia in the 19th century, an exhibit of the Pedagogical Museum in Belgrade

School discipline relates to actions taken by teachers or school organizations toward students when their behavior disrupts the ongoing educational activity or breaks a rule created by the school. Discipline can guide the children's behavior or set limits to help them learn to take better care of themselves, other people and the world around them.

School systems set rules, and if students break these rules they are subject to discipline. These rules may, for example, define the expected standards of school uniforms, punctuality, social conduct, and work ethic. The term "discipline" is applied to the action that is the consequence of breaking the rules. The aim of discipline is to set limits restricting certain behaviors or attitudes that are seen as harmful or against school policies, educational norms, school traditions, etc. The focus of discipline is shifting, and alternative approaches are emerging due to notably high dropout rates, disproportionate punishment upon minority students, and other educational inequalities.

== The purpose of discipline ==
Discipline is a set of consequences determined by the school district to remedy actions taken by a student that are deemed inappropriate. It is sometimes confused with classroom management, but while discipline is one dimension of classroom management, classroom management is a more general term.

Discipline is typically thought to have a positive influence on both the individual as well as the classroom environment. Utilizing disciplinary actions can be an opportunity for the class to reflect and learn about consequences, instill collective values, and encourage behavior that is acceptable for the classroom. Recognition of the diversity of values within communities can increase understanding and tolerance of different disciplinary techniques. In particular, moderate interventions such as encouraging positive corrections of questionable behavior inside the classroom by clearly showing the boundaries and making it clear that the behavior is unacceptable, as opposed to more severe punishments outside the classroom such as detention, suspension, or expulsion, can promote learning and deter future misbehavior. Learning to "own" one's bad behavior is also thought to contribute to positive growth in social emotional learning.

== Theory ==
School discipline practices are generally informed by theory from psychologists and educators. There are a number of theories to form a comprehensive discipline strategy for an entire school or a particular class.

- Positive approach is grounded in teachers' respect for students. This approach instills in students a sense of responsibility by using youth/adult partnerships to develop and share clear rules, provide daily opportunities for success, and administer in-school suspension for noncompliant students. Based on Glasser's reality therapy. Research (e.g., Allen) is generally supportive of the PAD program.
- Teacher effectiveness training differentiates between teacher-owned and student-owned problems, and proposes different strategies for dealing with each. Students are taught problem-solving and negotiation techniques. Researchers (e.g., Emmer and Aussiker) find that teachers like the programme and that their behaviour is influenced by it, but effects on student behaviour remain unclear.
- Adlerian approaches is an umbrella term for a variety of methods which emphasize understanding the individual's reasons for maladaptive behavior and helping misbehaving students to alter their behavior, whilst at the same time finding ways to get their needs met. Named after psychiatrist Alfred Adler, these approaches have shown some positive effects on self-concept, attitudes, and locus of control, but effects on behavior are inconclusive (Emmer and Aussiker). Not only were the statistics on suspensions and vandalism significant, but also the recorded interview of teachers demonstrates the improvement in student attitude and behaviour, school atmosphere, academic performance, and beyond that, personal and professional growth.
- Appropriate school learning theory and educational philosophy is a strategy for preventing violence and promoting order and discipline in schools, put forward by educational philosopher Daniel Greenberg and practiced by the Sudbury Valley School.

Some scholars think students misbehave because of the lack of engagement and stimulation in typical school settings, a rigid definition of acceptable behaviors and a lack of attention and love in a student's personal life. In the United States, scholars have begun to explore alternative explanations for why students are being disciplined, in particular the disproportionate rate of discipline towards African-American and minority students.

- Lack of engagement and stimulation – students are curious and constantly searching for meaning and stimulation in the school environment. Classes that are too one-dimensional, that fail to involve students sufficiently, are too challenging or are content intensive (leaving little room for discussion and consideration), will not satisfy students' curiosities or needs for authentic intellectual stimulation.
- A rigid definition of acceptable behavior – Most students, particularly older ones, are asked to sit at their desks for too long and listen, read, and take notes. Teachers who fail to offer opportunities for movement and interpersonal engagement are likelier to have to use strictness and rules to maintain law and order.
- Lack of attention and love – When students fail to receive the attention that they crave, they are likelier to find other ways to get it, even if it means drawing negative attention to themselves and even negative consequences. The more teachers let their students know how much they care about them and value their work, the likelier they are to respect a teacher's request and conform to their expectation.

Other models include:

=== Obedience ===
Discipline rooted in obedience centers on valuing hard work, diligence, adherence to authority, and self-discipline. An obedience-based model uses consequences and punishments as deterrents, whereas the responsibility-based model shifts away from using rules, limits, and consequences, as well as punitive measures like detention, suspension, expulsion, and counseling. Students have demonstrated improved academic success and better behavior management in schools with responsibility-centered discipline.

=== Responsibility ===
Responsibility-centered discipline, also known as responsibility-based discipline, is a classroom-oriented technique that empowers students to find solutions to organizational issues. This approach involves fostering appreciation and warmth among students, embracing their interests, recognizing their efforts, encouraging feedback, achieving consensus on ground rules, and engaging them in rule-making and problem-solving, all while maintaining dignity and well-defined boundaries. Concepts like remorse and empathy are taught through actions like apologies, restitution, or creating action plans. Limits express a teacher's beliefs, demands, and expectations within clear values and goals that help create a learning environment. The essence of responsibility-centered discipline is making choices that embody core values such as integrity, perseverance, respect, and responsibility rather than simply enforcing rules.

=== Assertive ===
Lee and Marlene Canter developed the assertive discipline model. It blends obedience-based principles with responsibility. In this approach, teachers require all students to consent to a set of rules establishing appropriate and inappropriate behaviors, clarifying the necessary corrections if a student exceeds these limits. Teachers acknowledge repetitive behaviors, maintaining an appreciation of good conduct. Disciplinary action must be applied throughout the classroom so all students believe that the rules matter. Simply offering rewards and consequences is not always sufficient; teachers must earn students' respect and trust.

Assertive discipline attempts to model appropriate behavior for students. Teachers guide students in adhering to behavioral expectations. The Canters emphasize building trust by greeting students, using their names, having one-on-one conversations, acknowledging birthdays and special events, and maintaining communication with parents. The model does not concentrate on individual students. It does not address the root causes of misbehavior, nor is it based on the needs of the students.

== Non-corporal forms of disciplinary action ==
=== Detention ===
Detention, sometimes referred to as DT, is one of the most common punishments in schools in the United States, the Commonwealth of Nations, and some other countries. It requires the student to report to a designated room (typically after the end of the school day, or during lunch or recess period) to complete extra work (such as writing lines or an essay, or the completion of chores). Detention can be supervised by the teacher setting the detention or through a centralised detention system. Detention may require a student to report at a certain time on a non-school day, e.g. "Saturday detention" at some US, UK, and Irish schools (especially for serious offences not quite serious enough for suspension). In UK schools, after-school detention can be held the same day as it is issued without parental consent, and some schools make a detention room available daily, but many will require a student to return to school 1–2 hours after school ends on a specific day, e.g. "Friday Night Detention". Failure to attend detention without a valid excuse can sometimes result in another being added, or a more severe punishment being administered, such as an in school or out of school suspension.

In Germany, detention is less common. In some states like Baden-Württemberg there is detention to rework missed school hours, but in others like Rheinland-Pfalz it is prohibited by law. In schools where some classes are held on Saturdays, pupils may get detention on a Saturday even if it is a non-school day for them.

In China, long-time detention is perhaps less common than in the US, the UK, Ireland, Singapore, Canada, Australia, New Zealand, South Africa, and some other countries. However, short-time detention by the teachers is still common. Teachers may ask the students to do some missed work after school.

In Australia, the school should consider circumstances when giving detentions. For example, in Victoria, it is recommended that no more than half the time for recess is used for detention, that detentions be held at a reasonable time and place, and when students are kept after school, parents should be informed at least the day before detention, and detention should not exceed 45 minutes.

=== Counseling ===
Counseling is also provided when students will have to see a school counselor (guidance counselor) for misbehavior. The purpose of counseling is to help the student recognize their mistakes and find positive ways to make changes in the student's life. Counseling can also help the student clarify the school's expectations, as well as understand the consequences of failing to meet those standards.

=== Suspension ===
Suspension or temporary exclusion is a mandatory leave assigned to a student as a form of punishment that can last anywhere from one day to a few weeks, during which the student is not allowed to attend regular lessons. In some US, UK, Australian, and Canadian schools, there are two types of suspension: In-school (ISS, internal exclusion, or isolation) and out-of-school (OSS, off-campus suspension, or external exclusion). In-school suspension means that the student comes to school as usual but must report to and stay in a designated room for the entire school day. Out-of-school suspension means that the student is banned from entering the school grounds, or being near their campus while suspended from school. A student who breaches an out-of-school suspension (by attending the school during their suspension) may be arrested for trespassing, and repeated breaches may lead to expulsion and/or possible criminal penalties. Students are also not allowed to attend after-school activities (such as proms, sporting events, etc.) while suspended from school. Some schools even utilize a loss of privilege policy that prohibits students returning from an out-of-school suspension from participating in the above mentioned school sponsored activities for as long as 2 weeks.

Schools are usually required to notify the student's parents/guardians and sometimes social worker if the suspended student is in special education, and explain the reason for and duration of a suspension. Students involved in physical altercations on campus can be suspended from school for a period of 5 days, while students who throw temper tantrums on campus, direct foul language at school staff members, or engage in verbal altercations with fellow students can be suspended for 3 days. Students are often required to continue to learn and complete assignments during their suspension, sometimes receiving no credit for it. This could include a written essay stating that they will not engage again in the behavior that led to the suspension or journal detailing the reason for the student being suspended from school, which they would be required to hand in to a school administrator upon returning to school following their suspension. Sometimes schools will have meetings with the suspended student, the student's parents, a school administrator, and sometimes a social worker in the case of a special education student to discuss and evaluate the matter following an out-of-school suspension. Studies suggest that school suspension is associated with increased risk of subsequent criminal justice system involvement and lower educational attainment. School suspension can also be associated with psychological distress, and to have a bi-directional link with mental illness. In the United Kingdom, excluded children have been targeted by "county lines" drug traffickers.

=== Expulsion ===
Expulsion, dismissal, exclusion, withdrawing, or permanent exclusion terminates the student's education at that institution. This is the last resort, when all other methods of discipline have failed. However, in extreme situations, it may also be used for an exceptionally serious 'one-off' offense, such as setting fires on campus, the activation of false alarms, or assault and battery against faculty and staff members, killing students or teachers, or school administrators, bomb threats, breaking into classrooms and school offices outside of school hours, and vandalism of school property. Setting off fireworks and firecrackers on campus can result in expulsion as well. Some education authorities have a nominated school in which all excluded students are collected; this typically has a much higher staffing level than mainstream schools. In some US public schools, expulsions are so serious that they require an appearance before the Board of Education or the court system. In the UK, head teachers may make the decision to exclude, but the student's parents have the right of appeal to the local education authority. It was completely banned for compulsory schools in China. This has proved controversial in cases where the head teacher's decision has been overturned (and his or her authority thereby undermined), and there are proposals to abolish the right of appeal. In the United States, when it comes to student discipline, there is a marked difference in procedure between public and private institutions.

With public schools, the school must provide the student with limited constitutional due process protections as public educational institutions operate as an extension of state governments. Conversely, with private schools, the student can be expelled for any reason – provided that the expulsion was not "arbitrary and capricious." In Virginia, as long as a private school follows the procedures in its student handbook, a court will likely not view its actions as arbitrary and capricious.

=== Restorative justice ===
In schools, restorative justice is an offshoot of the model used by some courts and law enforcement; it seeks to repair the harm that has been done by acknowledging the impact on the victim, community, and offender, accepting responsibility for the wrongdoing, and repairing the harm that was caused. Restorative practices can "also include preventive measures designed to build skills and capacity in students as well as adults." Some examples of preventative measures in restorative practices might include teachers and students devising classroom expectations together or setting up community building in the classroom. Restorative justice also focuses on justice as needs and obligations, expands justice as conversations between the offender, victim and school, and recognizes accountability as understanding the impact of actions and repairing the harm. Traditional styles of discipline do not always work well for students across every cultural community. As an alternative to the normative approaches of corporal punishment, detention, counseling, suspension, and expulsion, restorative justice was established to give students a voice in their consequences, as well as an opportunity to make a positive contribution to their community.

Restorative justice typically involves peer-mediation or adult-supervised conversations surrounding a perceived offence. Each student has the ability to contribute to the conversation, the person who has misbehaved has the opportunity not only to give their side of the story but also has a say in their consequence. Consequences defy the traditional methods of punitive punishment and instead give students an opportunity for restoration. Restorative justice focuses on relationship building and the community as a whole over the individual student and their offence, creating a sense that everyone has a part in the community and it is everyone's responsibility to uphold the values of the particular community. This is a method that not only increases an understanding of perceived community values, but is also a method thought to work well in cultures and communities where there is a high value on the community, rather than just on the individual.

In 2012, the U.S. Commission on Civil Rights released a report entitled "School Discipline and Disparate Impact," which was somewhat critical of the Department of Education's approach to school discipline.

== Corporal punishment ==
Throughout the history of education, the most common means of maintaining discipline in schools was corporal punishment. While a child was in school, a teacher was expected to act as a substitute parent, with many forms of parental discipline or rewards open to them. This often meant that students were commonly chastised with the birch, cane, paddle, strap or yardstick if they did something wrong. Around 69 countries still use school corporal punishment.

Corporal punishment in schools has now disappeared from most Western countries, including all European countries. In the United States, corporal punishment is not used in public schools in 36 states, banned in 33, and permitted in 17, of which only 14 actually have school districts actively administering corporal punishment. Every U.S. state except New Jersey and Iowa permits corporal punishment in private schools, but an increasing number of private schools have abandoned the practice, especially Catholic schools. Thirty-one U.S. states as well as the District of Columbia have banned corporal punishment from public schools, most recently Colorado in 2023. The other 17 states (mostly in the South) continue to allow corporal punishment in public schools. Of the 17 which permit the practice, three – Arizona, North Carolina, Wyoming have no public schools that actually use corporal punishment as of 2023. In North Carolina however, all school districts have banned the practice. Paddling is still used to a significant (though declining) degree in some public schools in Alabama, Arkansas, Georgia, Louisiana, Mississippi, Missouri, Oklahoma, Tennessee and Texas. Private schools in these and most other states may also use it, though many choose not to do so.

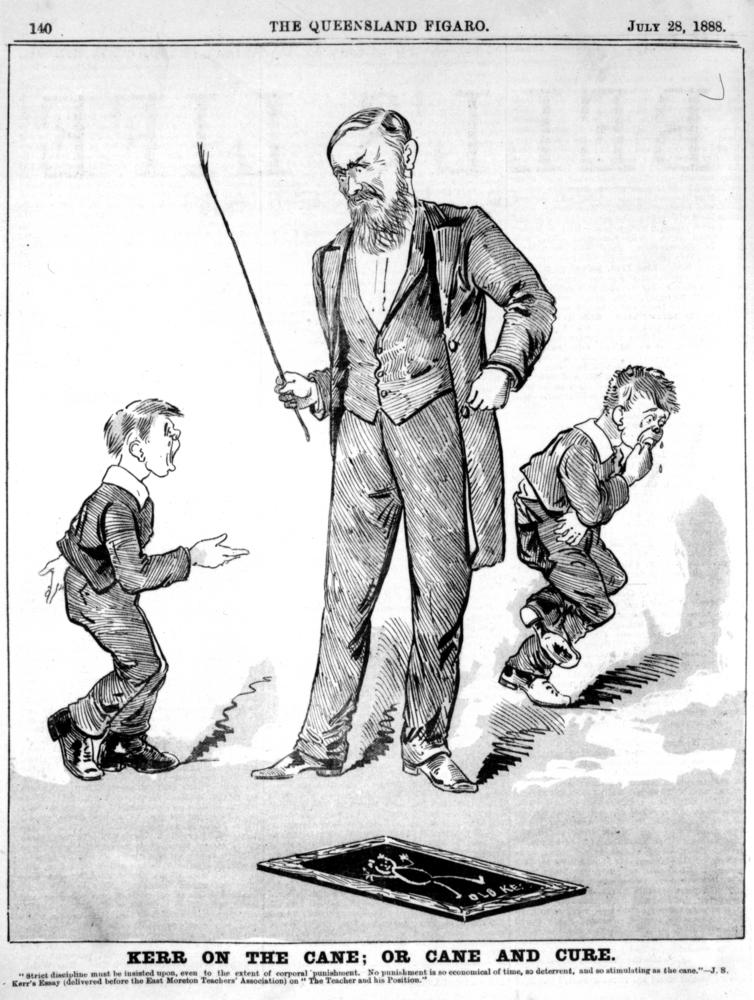
A cartoon picture that shows students receiving "Corporal Punishment"

Official corporal punishment, often by caning, remains commonplace in schools in some Asian, African and Caribbean countries.

Most mainstream schools in most other countries retain punishment for misbehavior, but it usually takes non-corporal forms such as detention and suspension.

In China, school corporal punishment was completely banned under the Article 29 of the Compulsory Education Act of the People's Republic of China, but in practice, beating by schoolteachers is still common, especially in rural areas.

In Australia, school corporal punishment has been banned in public schools in all states, but as of 2019, it is still permitted in private schools in Queensland and the Northern Territory.

== In the United States ==
=== Federal level ===
==== Background ====
In the United States, many of the state and federal laws surrounding school discipline originate from zero-tolerance policies for student misconduct practiced by policy-makers from the 1980s and 1990s. With the increasing use of zero-tolerance policies, by 1997 the federal government was funding the use of police officers in schools, resulting in an increased use of discipline in schools across the country and an influx of students entering the juvenile justice system. By 2000, 41 states had laws in place requiring cases involving students who committed criminal violations in school, like drug possession, to be handled by law enforcement and juvenile courts, instead of the schools themselves. During this time, Black students accounted for over one-third of all corporal punishment cases and in-school and out-of-school suspensions, nearly one-third of all expulsions and school-related arrests, and over one-quarter of all referrals to law enforcement; rates around three times higher than that of white students.

Public schools are prohibited from using disciplinary practices as a form of discrimination. The Education Department's Office for Civil Rights is tasked with deciding whether or not to investigate students' reports of disciplinary racial discrimination. Former United States Secretary of Education Betsy DeVos enacted delays and eliminations of student discipline guidance under the United States Education Department. In 2016, the Obama administration required states to address racial disparities in special education under the Individuals with Disabilities Education Act, but DeVos delayed the implementation of these requirements. In 2014, the United States Department of Justice and the Education Department's Office for Civil Rights issued guidance to reduce racial disparities in suspension and expulsion. In 2019, DeVos defended the Education Department's choice to repeal this guidance.

==== Student protections ====
Today, schools across the U.S. suspend, expel, and punish Black students at a higher rate than white students. Despite these rates, there are multiple federal laws against racial discrimination in schools. There are two groups for these laws: disparate treatment and disparate impact.

Disparate treatment laws allow students the right to testify against schools and school districts for intentional racial discrimination. Under the equal protection and due process clauses of the 14th Amendment and Title VI of the Civil Rights Act of 1964, students who feel they have been intentionally racially discriminated against can testify against their schools or school districts.

Disparate impact laws, including the federal regulations of Title VI and the Individuals with Disabilities Education Act, allow federal agencies to testify against schools and school districts for policies they have put in place that ultimately result in racial discrimination, regardless of the intent behind the people practicing those policies. Violations of these regulations can cause schools and school districts to lose federal funding.

==== Mitigation and reform ====
Positive Behavior Intervention and Supports (PBIS) programs examine disciplinary issues, attempt to reduce the severity of punishment for students, and provide increased support for students who have emotional and behavioral disorders. PBIS programs are supported by the United States Department of Education Office of Special Education Programs Technical Assistance Center and have been used by schools across the United States.

=== Across U.S. states ===
==== General trends ====
Racial disparities in suspension and expulsion vary across the United States, Atlanta, Georgia, Chicago, Illinois, Houston, Texas; and St. Paul. Minnesota has schools and school districts that, on average, suspend Black students at least six times more than white students. A study by the University of Pennsylvania concluded that Alabama, Arkansas, Florida, Georgia, Kentucky, Louisiana, Mississippi, North Carolina, South Carolina, Tennessee, Texas, Virginia and West Virginia schools contribute over half of all suspensions and expulsions of Black students in America. In these thirteen states, Black students make up about 24% of the students in public schools, but 48% of suspension cases and 49% of expulsion cases. Today, 19 states allow the use of corporal punishment in schools, including Arkansas, a state that ranks 13th in the country for highest disciplinary disparity between Black and white students.

In the state of New York, black students are suspended at a rate over four times higher than white students; in New York City, this figure increases, with Black students being suspended at a rate over five times higher than white students. Schools in New York suspend nearly one in five Black male high-schoolers. In California, Black males are suspended more frequently than any other racial or gender group, and Black females are the third most often suspended group. Black students with disabilities in California lose about 44 more days of school instruction due to disciplinary consequences than their white peers with disabilities.

==== Mitigation and reform ====
Schools across the country are making efforts to reform their disciplinary systems and practices to reduce racial disparities. A study in North Carolina found that having Black teachers is associated with lowered amounts of exclusionary discipline for Black students, across all age, gender, and income ranges. To reduce its racial disciplinary disparity, Arkansas' state regulations are beginning to request that school districts make an effort to racially diversify their staff. School disciplinary policies in Arkansas are technically decided by state laws and the Arkansas Department of Education, but schools within Arkansas have some decision-making authority, which allowed them the power to suggest the diversification of their staff, as well as other policies that are being put into place to reduce racialized disciplinary disparities, including but not limited to:

- Disciplinary punishments permitted for students are required to be written into a school district's policy.
- In school districts where corporal punishment is used, the district must establish specific policies for when and how to employ it.
- School districts are required to inform students' parents of disciplinary policies and provide written proof of the existence of said policies. These policies are required to be filed with the Arkansas Department of Education and include due process.
- All school personnel, including teachers, administrators, volunteers, and all employees are required to undergo student discipline training.

Similarly to Arkansas, schools in Virginia are attempting to improve training for teachers and administrators. In California, multiple school districts have completely eliminated suspensions for Kindergarten through twelfth grade in public schools. The New York State Education Department and the Board of Regents has included out-of-school suspensions in the Every Student Succeeds Act, attempting to hold schools accountable for the suspension rates of different groups of students, this includes Black students' higher suspension rates compared to that of other racial and ethnic groups.

=== Across school districts ===
==== Demographics ====
Within the United States of America, urban educational institutions service the largest portion of Black students in primary and secondary education. On a larger scale, urban educational institutions with a predominantly Black student body yield higher rates of punitive disciplinary actions in comparison to institutions with a predominantly white student body. Black students attending urban educational institutions are more likely to receive suspension and to be arrested than white students. On a smaller scale, rural school districts with a larger portion of Black students also yield higher rates of punitive disciplinary actions than predominantly white school districts.

==== County-level ====
Individual school districts within a state have jurisdiction to implement and enforce education-related policies within their educational institutions. Dependent on a school district's approach to resolving behavioral conflicts, the disparities between rates and intensity of discipline between white and Black students can intensify or lessen. The subjectivity of approach to behavioral policies allows for external factors such as socioeconomic and racial demographic factors to feature into an institution's utilization of disciplinary actions.

==== Truancy ====
An example of the varying racial disparities in discipline across U.S. counties and school districts is the different disciplinary approaches to solving truancy, eg. "any intentional, unjustified, unauthorized, or illegal absence from compulsory education". The Los Angeles County District enacted punitive measures to decrease the rate of absenteeism occurring within the district's educational institutions. It piloted the Abolish Chronic Truancy (ACT) program that would discipline absenteeism through penal punishments for both students and their parental guardians. Punishments for parental guardians include legal prosecution with a maximum penalty of a fine up to $2,500 per child and up to a year sentencing. For students, punishments may be prosecution in juvenile court with potential penalties including fines, probation, community service, and mandated attendance of a truancy education program. Socioeconomic factors—lack of transportation, acting as a caregiver for siblings, etc.-- that affect a student's attendance and likelihood of penal punishments disproportionately affects low-income black students.

Another approach that some U.S. school districts have used to reduce truancy is rehabilitating students and accounting for external factors. For example, the office of Alameda County Assistant District Attorney Teresa Drenick within the Alameda County School District has piloted a diversion program to increase attendance. The program addresses students with high absenteeism rates with consistently absent students by providing access to therapy, health services, and resources such as bus passes. The county reports that the program has been "more than 90% successful at getting students back in class", thereby decreasing absenteeism rates.

==== Students with disabilities ====
The disparity in punitive disciplinary actions between Black and white students is further widened for Black students with disabilities. National surveys on disparities in school discipline have found higher rates of suspension among Black students with disabilities. From 2014 to 2015, the national average of days lost per 100 enrolled for students with disabilities was 119.0 days for Black students and 43.0 days for white students.

An existent effort to decrease rates of disciplinary actions for Black students with disabilities have examined the effects of same-race teachers within the classroom. For example, from 2014 to 2015, North Carolina had a wider gap in disparities than the national average in which Black students lost 158.3 days per 100 enrolled and white students lost 64.1 days. North Carolina, like many states, has local school districts with a higher percentage of Black staff and teachers than other districts. A study by researchers Constance A. Lindsey and Cassandra M. D. Hart demonstrates that Black females reduced disciplinary rates for Black male students with disabilities by a "2 percentage points to approximately 14 percent" decline. Additionally, students with Black male teachers within the study had a reduced disciplinary rate by "15 to 13 percent". The study suggests that school districts with an increased percentage of Black students may exhibit lower rates of punitive disciplinary actions for Black students with disabilities and have a lessened gap between Black and white students.

=== Within the classroom ===
In the United States, African-American students, particularly boys, are disciplined significantly more often and more severely than any other demographic. This disparity is very well documented and contributes substantially to negative life outcomes for affected students. The resulting tendency of minors and young adults from disadvantaged backgrounds to become incarcerated is widely referred to as the "school-to-prison pipeline".

According to data published by the U.S. Department of Education, African-American students are three times more likely to be suspended and expelled than their white peers. Research overwhelmingly suggests that when given an opportunity to choose among several disciplinary options for a relatively minor offense, teachers and school administrators disproportionately choose more severe punishment for African-American students than for white students for the same offense. Even when controlling factors such as family income, African-American boys are more likely to receive out-of-school suspensions than white boys for the same behavior within the same school.

A recent study published by the National Academy of Sciences, using U.S. federal data covering more than 32 million students and around 96,000 schools, showed that "the disciplinary gap between black and white students across five types of disciplinary actions is associated with county-level rates of racial bias." Other high-powered studies have shown "increased racial and gender disproportionality for subjectively defined behaviors in classrooms, and for incidents classified as more severe", and that "Black-White disciplinary gaps . . . emerge as early as in prekindergarten and widen with grade progression." Such disparities in exclusionary forms of discipline have been shown to be mitigated in classrooms run by African-American teachers, with especially strong mitigation of office referrals for subjectively defined behavior such as "willful defiance".

When disparities occur within the classroom they are often covert and passive. This means that instead of outwardly discriminating against a student because of their color teachers discreetly give fewer advantages to students of color. Examples of this could include counselors or teachers influencing students of color to take easier classes or to not attend four-year universities, and teachers not learning the correct way to pronounce student names. This can also include white students being given more chances before serious discipline is enacted, such as suspension or expulsion. According to a study published by the Association for Psychological Science, teachers often recognize second offenses in the classroom as the result of a pattern of wrongdoing when it comes to Black students while white students' offenses are often labeled as isolated incidents.

==== Black girls ====
While it has been proven that black boys in the U.S. tend to be disciplined more often and more severely, evidence also suggests that black girls experience more racial bias in their education. A research study conducted by the National Women's Law Center and the Education Trust observed that "Black girls are five times more likely than white girls to be suspended at least once and four times as likely as white girls to be arrested at school." The racial bias is compounded as girls also experience gender bias within the classroom, a phenomenon coined as educational inequality. Based on data published by The National Bureau of Economic Research on the short-term and long-term consequences of teachers' stereotypical biases, it was found that teacher biases have a positive effect on boys' achievements in class but have a negative effect on girls' achievements. This can have long-term consequences for the futures of Black girls as it can prevent them from enrolling in the advanced-level classes that are commonly required for STEM majors in college.

==== Socioeconomic status ====
Disciplinary methods also vary based on students' socioeconomic status. While high-income students are often reported to receive mild to moderate consequences (e.g. a teacher reprimand or seat reassignment), low-income students are reported to receive more severe consequences, sometimes delivered in a less-than-professional manner (e.g. being yelled at in front of class, being made to stand in the hallway all day, or having their personal belongings searched).

Some researchers argue that zero-tolerance discipline policies in effect criminalize infractions such as dress-code violations or talking back to a teacher, and that these policies disproportionately target disadvantaged students.

=== Implications ===
Due to increased suspension and expulsion rates, black students are losing instructional time by spending more time away from the classroom. Lost instructional time can result in lower retainment levels of educational material, lower graduation rates, and higher drop-out rates. Higher rates of punishment in schools can increase interactions between black students and law enforcement when black students are punished with referrals to law enforcement for disciplinary infractions. Referrals to law enforcement following the report of a student to a law enforcement agency or officer by a school employee can include citations, tickets, court referrals, and in some cases arrests, though not all referrals lead to arrests. These interactions with the law are a precursor for the school-to-prison pipeline, which disproportionately affects black students.

== See also ==
- Adultism
- Child discipline
- Classroom management
- Positive behavior support
- Positive discipline
- School district drug policies
- School to prison pipeline
- School violence
- Zero tolerance (schools)

== Sources ==
- Arum, Richard (October 30, 2003). Judging School Discipline: The Crisis of Moral Authority. Harvard University Press. ISBN 978-0-674-01179-3.
- Glasser, William (May 15, 2001). Counseling With Choice Theory: The New Reality Therapy. HarperCollins. ISBN 978-0-06-095366-9.
- McIntyre, T. (2005). "Assertive Discipline". maxweber.hunter.cuny.edu.
