= School-to-prison pipeline =

Tendency of U.S. adolescents from disadvantaged backgrounds to become incarcerated

In the United States, the school-to-prison pipeline (SPP), also known as the school-to-prison link, school–prison nexus, or schoolhouse-to-jailhouse track, is the disproportionate tendency of minors and young adults from disadvantaged backgrounds to become incarcerated because of increasingly harsh school and municipal policies. Additionally, this is due to educational inequality in the United States. In other contexts, this situation has been reversed when Successful Educational Actions have been implemented from schools, involving the whole community.

Furthermore, many experts have credited factors such as school disturbance laws, zero-tolerance policies and practices, and an increase in police in schools in creating the "pipeline". This has become a hot topic of debate in discussions surrounding educational disciplinary policies as media coverage of youth violence and mass incarceration has grown during the early 21st century.

The term school–prison nexus in place of school-to-prison pipeline is sometimes used to challenge the idea of a unidirectional pipeline that begins in schools in order to show that schools work within a web of institutions, policies, and practices that funnel youth into prisons. Moreover, it may no longer operate as a "pathway" to prison but instead as a de facto prison.

The current climate of mass incarceration in the US increases the contact the incarceration system has with the US education system. More specifically, these patterns of criminalization translate into the school context. Specific practices implemented in US schools over the past 10 years to reduce violence in schools, including zero-tolerance policies and an increase in school resource officers (SROs), have created the environment for criminalization of youth in schools. This results from patterns of discipline in schools mirroring law-enforcement models.

The disciplinary policies and practices that create an environment for the US SPP to occur disproportionately affect disabled, Latino, and Black students, which is later reflected in the rates of incarceration. Between 1999 and 2007, the percentage of Black students being suspended has increased by 12 percent, while the percentage of white students being suspended has declined since the implementation of zero-tolerance policies. Of the total incarcerated population in the US, 56 percent are Black or Latino.

== History ==
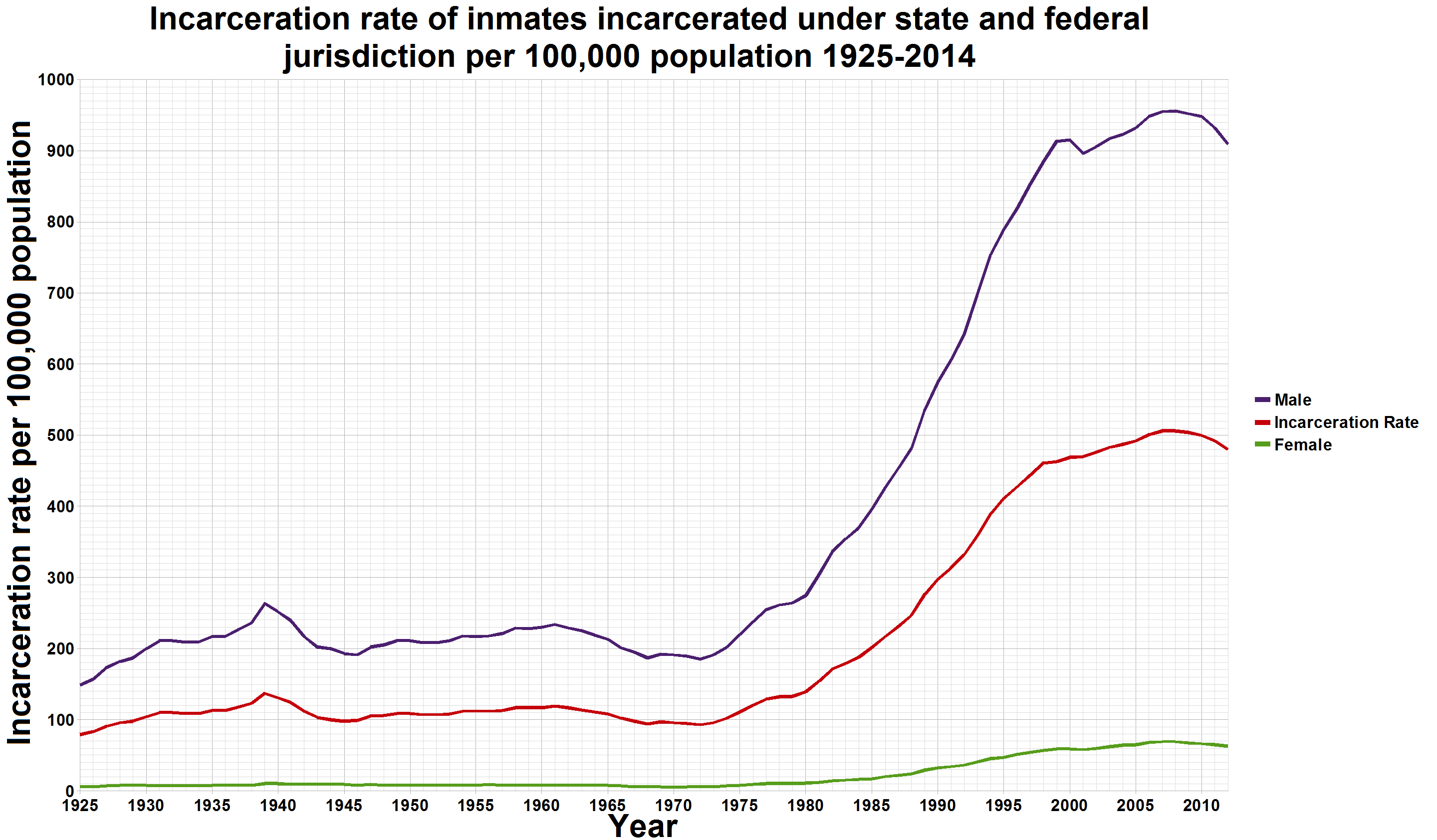
A graph of the incarceration rate under state and federal jurisdiction per 100,000 population 1925–2008 (omits local jail inmates). The male incarceration rate (top line) is roughly 15 times the female rate (bottom line).

For the half-century prior to 1975, the incarceration rate in the US was fairly constant at roughly 0.1 percent of the population, as indicated in the accompanying figure. The overall incarceration rate in the US has grown rapidly and steadily since 1972, rising by six to eight percent per year until 2000. Growth rates declined in the first decade of the 2000s and peaked at 506 per 100,000 in 2007 and 2008. From its peak in 2009 and 2010, the population of state and federal prisoners decreased slightly in 2011 and 2012. However, the incarceration rate, including those in jail, in 2012 was 707 per 100,000 people, which was more than four times the rate in 1972.

== Causes ==
Exclusionary disciplinary policies, specifically zero-tolerance policies, that remove students from the school environment increase the probability of a youth coming into contact with the incarceration system. Zero-tolerance policies have led to the mistreatment of students' situations and strict disciplinary action which greatly impact the students' future, causing them to go to juvenile detention centers or prison.

Approximately 3.3 million suspensions and over 100,000 expulsions occur each year. This number has nearly doubled since 1974, with rates escalating in the mid-1990s as zero-tolerance policies began to be widely adopted. Rising rates of the use of expulsion and suspension are not connected to higher rates of misbehaviors. Risky behaviors is something suspended students will most likely engage in. Zero-tolerance disciplinary policies have been adopted across the country.

Research is increasingly examining the connections between school failure and later contact with the criminal justice system for minorities. Once a child drops out, they are eight times more likely to be incarcerated than youth who graduate from high school. Studies have found that 68 percent of all males in state and federal prison do not have a high school diploma. Suspensions and expulsions have been shown to correlate with a young person's probability of dropping out and becoming involved with the criminal justice system. According to the American Civil Liberties Union, "Students suspended or expelled for a discretionary violation are nearly 3 times more likely to be in contact with the juvenile justice system the following year." However, it is unclear if the factors determining the risk of dropping out are not wholly or partially the same as the factors determining the risk of incarceration as an individual likely to enter the criminal justice system is also likely to encounter difficulties within the education system.

From 1980 to 2008, the number of people incarcerated in the US quadrupled from roughly 500,000 to 2.3 million people. The graphic to the right shows the uniqueness of this practice in comparison to other countries across the globe, with the US incarcerating a larger portion of its population than any other country in 2008. The US holds 25 percent of the world's prisoners but only has five percent of the world's population.

== Disparities ==
School disciplinary policies disproportionately affect Black and Latino youth in the education system. Ultimately, this means that they are more likely to be suspended, expelled, or arrested; a practice known as the discipline gap. This discipline gap is also connected to the achievement gap. The US Department of Education Office for Civil Rights issued a brief in 2014 outlining the current disparities. Black students are suspended and expelled at a rate three times greater than white students. The Advancement Project found that "In the 2006-2007 school year, there was no state in which African-American students were not suspended more often than white students." On average, five percent of white students are suspended, compared to 16 percent of Black students. Black students represent 16 percent of student enrollment, 27 percent of students referred to law enforcement, and 31 percent of students subjected to a school-related arrest. Combined, 70 percent of students involved in "In-School arrests or referred to law enforcement are Black or Latino." The majority of these arrests are under zero-tolerance policies.

Disparities were found in the implementation of zero-tolerance policies in relation to minor offenses. In 2010 in North Carolina, Black students were punished for the same minor offenses, specifically cell phone, dress code, disruptive behavior, and display of affection by more than 15 percent for each category of offense than white students. According to the American Civil Liberties Union, "'Zero-tolerance' policies criminalize minor infractions of school rules, while cops in school lead to students being criminalized for behavior that should be handled inside the school. Students of color are especially vulnerable to push-out trends and the discriminatory application of discipline." Additionally, "The Council of State Governments Report found that black students were more likely to be disciplined for less serious 'discretionary' offenses, and that when other factors were controlled for, higher percentages of White students were disciplined on more serious non-discretionary grounds, such as possessing drugs or carrying a weapon."

A 2009 study reported that the racial disparity in rates of school suspensions could not be explained solely by racial differences in rates of delinquent behavior and that this disparity in turn was "strongly associated with similar levels of disproportion in juvenile court referrals". Similarly, a 2010 study found that Black students were more likely to be referred to the office than students of other races and that this disparity could be partly, but not completely, explained by student behavior and school-level factors. According to Fordham Law Review Online, "In the juvenile justice system, black girls are the fastest growing demographic when it comes to arrest and incarceration." A 2014 study found that, although Black students were more likely to be suspended, this disparity "was completely accounted for by a measure of the prior problem behavior of the student" and concluded that "the use of suspensions by teachers and administrators may not have been as racially biased as some scholars have argued". Another 2015 study using a national high school dataset concluded that "misconduct and deviant attitudes were important factors in predicting the receipt of out-of-school suspensions though results indicated that Black students did not generally misbehave or endorse deviant attitudes more than White students did".

These interdisciplinary policies and practices disproportionately impact students from historically disadvantaged backgrounds such as, Latino and Black. It also been noted that students of minority groups were vulnerable to expulsions and that Black girls are also highly criminalized for being absent from a schooling context. Dorothy E. Hines and Dorinda J. Carter Andrews have argued that increasing rates criminalization of Black girls, disciplinary enforcements such as harsh policies, and bans against "various student offenses" can be illuminated through (a) zero-tolerance policies including various forms of surveillance measures, (b) policing of their bodies as criminals, and (c) penalizing "bad" girl attitudes."

Schools with a higher percentage of Black students are more likely to implement zero-tolerance policies and to use extremely punitive discipline, supporting the racial threat hypothesis.

In addition to racial inequities, there are extant disparities and overlap of students with disabilities in the juvenile system. This disparity is exacerbated by students of color being disproportionately represented among students with diagnosed disabilities.

== Current policies maintaining the link ==
=== Zero-tolerance policies ===
Zero-tolerance policies are school disciplinary policies that set predetermined consequences or punishments for specific offenses. By nature, zero-tolerance policies, as any policy that is "unreasonable rule or policy that is the same for everyone but has an unfair effect on people who share a particular attribute", often become discriminatory. The zero-tolerance approach was first introduced in the 1980s to reduce drug use in schools. The use of zero-tolerance policies spread more widely in the 1990s. To reduce gun violence, the Gun Free Schools Act of 1994 (GFSA) required that schools receiving federal funding "must 1) have policies to expel for a calendar year any student who brings a firearm to school or to school zone, and 2) report that student to local law enforcement, thereby blurring any distinction between disciplinary infractions at school and the law". During the 1996–1997 schoolyear, 94 percent of schools had zero-tolerance policies for firearms, 87 percent for alcohol, and 79 percent for violence.

Over the past decade, zero-tolerance policies have expanded to predetermined punishments for a wide degree of rule violations. Zero-tolerance policies do not distinguish between serious and nonserious offenses. All students who commit a given offense receive the same treatment. Behaviors punished by zero-tolerance policies are most often nonserious offense and are punished on the same terms as a student would be for bringing a gun or drugs to school. In 2006, 95 percent of out-of-school suspensions were for nonviolent, minor disruptions such as tardiness. In 2006–2007, "out-of-school suspensions for non-serious, non-violent offenses accounted for 37.2% of suspensions in Maryland, whereas only 6.7% of suspensions were issued for dangerous behaviors". In Chicago, the widespread adoption of zero-tolerance policies in 1994 resulted in a 51 percent increase in student suspensions for the next four years and a 3,000 percent increase in expulsions.

The most direct way these policies increase the probability of a youth coming into contact with the incarceration system is through their exclusionary methods. Suspension, expulsion, and an increased risk of dropping out all contribute to a youth's increased chances of becoming involved with the incarceration system. Suspension removes students from the structure and supervision provided through schooling, providing opportunities for youth to engage in criminal activities while not in the school environment. Other factors may include "increased exposure to peers involved in antisocial behavior, as well as effects on school performance and completion and student attitudes toward antisocial behavior". Suspension can lead to feelings of alienation from the school setting that can lead to students to feel rejected, increasing chances of relationships with antisocial peers. Relationships with peers have strong impacts on student behavior, demonstrated through differential association theory. Students are more than twice as likely to be arrested during months in which they are forcibly removed from school. Students who have been suspended are three times more likely to drop out by the 10th grade than students who have never been suspended. Dropping out makes that student three times more likely to be incarcerated.

=== Policing in schools ===
Zero tolerance policies increase the number of SROs in schools, which increases the contact a student has with the criminal justice system. Students may be referred by teachers or other administrators but most often zero-tolerance policies are directly enforced by police or SROs. The practice of increasing the number of police in schools contributes to patterns of criminalization. This increase in SROs has led to contemporary school discipline beginning to mirror approaches used in legal and law enforcement. Zero-tolerance policies increase the use of profiling, a very common practice used in law enforcement. This practice is able to identify students who may engage in misbehavior, but the use of profiling is unreliable in ensuring school safety, as this practice over identifies students from minority populations. There were no students involved in the 1990s shootings who were Black or Latino and the 1990s school shootings were the main basis for the increase in presence of police in schools. Data shows that people of color with disabilities are the most affected by the SPP.

A Justice Policy Institute report (2011) found a 38-percent increase in the number of SROs between 1997 and 2007 as a result of the growing implementation of zero-tolerance policies. In 1999, 54 percent of students surveyed reported seeing a security guard or police officer in their school; by 2005, this number increased to 68 percent. The education system has seen a huge increase in the number of students referred to law enforcement. In one city in Georgia, when police officers were introduced into the schools, "school-based referrals to juvenile court in the county increased 600% over a three year period". There was no increase in the number of serious offenses or safety violations during this three-year period. In 2012, 41 states required schools to report students to law enforcement for various misbehaviors on school grounds. This practice increases the use of law enforcement professionals in handling student behavior and decreases the use of in-classroom (nonexclusionary) management of behaviors.

In 2014, the United Nations Human Rights Committee expressed concern with increasing criminalization of students in response to school disciplinary problems and recommended that the US government "promote the use of alternatives to the application of criminal law" to address such issues. The committee also noted its concern with the use of corporal punishment in schools in the US. In the second Universal Periodic Review of the US's human rights record, the government avowed taking "effective measures to help ensure non-discrimination in school discipline policies and practices".

In March 2010, at the Carver Primary School in the lower South Side, Chicago, several first-grade students were handcuffed, and told that they were going to prison and would never see their parents again, after they talked in class.

In November 2011, at Orange River Elementary School in Florida, an assistant principal called the police after a girl kissed a boy.

In February 2010, the principal of a junior high school in Forest Hills, Queens, New York, called police after a 12-year-old student used a green magic marker to write, "I love my friends Abby and Faith. Lex was here 2/1/10 :)" on a desk. A police officer handcuffed the girl and took her to the police station.

In October 2010, at Southern Lee High School in Lee County, North Carolina, a 12th grade honors student, who was taking college-level classes, was charged with misdemeanor possession of a weapon on school grounds and suspended for the rest of the school year, after she brought a paring knife to school. The student had mistakenly taken her father's lunch box to school, which looked the same as her own lunch box. The school found the knife while searching the lunch box for illegal drugs, which the student did not have.

In 2014, in Lynchburg, Virginia, an 11-year-old Black autistic boy was charged with a misdemeanor disorderly contact for kicking a trash can. Some time later, this same kid was walking to join other students, and the same officer that reprimanded him for the trash can grabbed him, pushed him to the floor, and arrested him. As a result, the officer charged him with felony assault on a police officer.

== Robbins v. Lower Merion School District ==
In Rosemont, Pennsylvania, Harriton High School lent students laptop computers by way of their One-to-One initiative program. Over 2,000 students were given these laptops for school and home usage. Unbeknownst to the students and parents, the school district had webcams installed on each computer that were utilized to take images of students' activities while on the computer. The school district used these photos to attempt to incriminate students. In November 2009, the school's assistant principal falsely accused a student of selling illegal drugs after a school employee saw the student holding Mike and Ike candy while the student was at home.

== Events affecting the SPP ==
1. A large factor of the SPP is the disproportionate disciplinary actions taken against students of color. In recent years, the media has reported about some of these experiences.
2. Examples of zero-tolerance policies and its role in SPP statistics.

In early 2018, a 14-year-old Black boy came to school with a new haircut. The haircut featured a design made with a razor. The student was pulled out of class one day at Tenaya Middle School in Fresno, California, because of his haircut, which the school claimed violated their dress code. The child's mother claimed, "The vice principal told my son that he needed to cut his hair because it was distracting and violated the dress code." The child's mother claims she agreed to get her son a new haircut; she also said she was unable to immediately get an appointment due to a lack of Black barbers in her area. When her son arrived at school the next day, according to the child's mother, the school explained to her that he would face in-school suspension after returning with his haircut. The mother claims, "I requested that my son is issued a warning, to allow time to grow out his hair."

In early 2018, a Black male student at the Apache Junction High School in Arizona wore a blue bandana to school, which violated the dress code. His teacher called the police on him for not removing his bandana. He was then arrested and suspended for nine days.

In mid-2018, an 11-year-old Black girl, Faith Fennidy, was sent home from a private Roman Catholic school in Louisiana because she had hair extensions. The young girl had been wearing extensions to school for two years before a new policy was added. The policy prohibits extensions, clip-ins, and/or weaves. The child would have to adhere to the policy to attend school. The family chose to withdraw the student from the school; the student was not suspended or expelled.

In 2012, at Creekside Elementary School in Milledgeville, Georgia, a six-year-old student, Salecia Johnson, was crying and flailing on the floor of her principal's office. The principal said she was inconsolable, had thrown various items, and had damaged school property during a tantrum. Salecia was handcuffed and transported to a police station. The child was initially charged as a juvenile with simple battery of a school teacher and criminal damage to property, but it was later decided the girl would not be charged because of her age.

== Impact of COVID-19 pandemic ==
On March 11, 2020, the World Health Organization (WHO) declared the COVID-19 disease a global pandemic, resulting in school shutdowns across multiple countries, including the US. Based on a report by UNICEF, approximately 94 percent of all countries enacted forms of remote learning to continue education for children in response to government closures caused by the COVID-19 pandemic. Likewise, as a result of the pandemic, in the US, state and federal legislation either closed public schools and transferred to virtual instruction or offered hybrid learning, a mixture of face-to-face instruction and online learning. As school districts in the US encountered difficulty navigating requirements to provide education in remote settings, disciplinary practices continued to reflect aspects of the SPP with zero-tolerance policies just as harmful as those before the COVID-19 pandemic. Since the nation's transition to remote learning, punishments including out-of-school suspension, juvenile detention, and police involvement have been enacted for minor infractions that have occurred in virtual learning environments.

- In May 2020, a 15-year-old Black female student with ADHD in Michigan was sent to a juvenile detention center for not turning in her online homework. The juvenile court concluded that her failure to submit her homework violated her probation and sentenced her to 78 days in juvenile detention. She was later released after an adverse reaction from the public.
- In August 2020, Isaiah Elliot, a 12-year-old Black student with ADHD attending virtual school in Colorado, was punished after being seen on his computer camera picking up a toy Nerf gun. Isaiah was suspended for five days by the school, which later contacted police to conduct a welfare check before notifying his parents.

As before the pandemic, the "virtual" SPP continues to disproportionately impact racial minorities, predominantly African-American and Hispanic students from low-income backgrounds, and students with disabilities. There are more than 48,000 youth confined in facilities in the US on any given day. According to a report by the NAACP, as of 2020, "African American children represent 32% of children who are arrested, 42% of children who are detained, and 52% of children whose cases are judicially waived to criminal court." Additionally, students with disabilities account for 8.6 percent of the student population in the US but represent 36 percent of incarcerated youth. Because students of color and students with disabilities are disproportionately incarcerated, they represent a large number of youth at risk for contracting COVID-19 and other infectious diseases. On that note, infectious diseases are severely concentrated in both adult and juvenile correctional facilities. The Marshall Project reported that most juvenile prison facilities have more than 80-percent infection rates. Moreover, approximately "15% of jail inmates and 22% of prisoners—compared to 5% of the general population—are reported having tuberculosis, Hepatitis B and C, HIV/AIDS, or other STDs."

== Controversy over efforts to reduce racial disparities ==
In 2014, the Obama administration issued guidance that urged schools to reduce the number of suspensions and expulsions, especially of minority students, thereby stemming the school-to-prison pipeline. During the Trump administration, in December 2018, Secretary of Education Betsy DeVos rescinded these guidelines. In doing so, she cited research by John Paul Wright and four coauthors that purported to show that the disparate rates of suspensions and expulsions were due not to racism but rather to prior poor behavior by Black students.

Lead author John Paul Wright has advocated for the fringe view that Black people evolved to be genetically inferior to white people. In the study cited by DeVos, Wright et al. assumed that teachers' reporting of behavior was accurate and unbiased. They concluded that "the racial gap in suspensions was completely accounted for by a measure of the prior problem behavior of the student—a finding never before reported in the literature". However, other scholars have found implicit bias and racial discrimination in teachers' interpretation of behavior of Black students as more threatening than similar behavior by white students.

Education researcher Francis Huang found other methodological flaws in the study by Wright et al., such as sample bias (comparison between a sample of 4,101 students and a reduced sample of 2,737 students who were not representative of the earlier sample) and their use of the Social Skills Rating Scale as a proxy for evaluating prior behavior. Correcting for sample bias in the study by Wright et al. led Huang to conclude that their data confirmed what earlier researchers had found regarding racial disparities in punishment that could not be accounted for by actual differences in behavior.

== Alternative approaches ==
=== Restorative justice ===
The use of restorative justice in schools began in the early 1990s with initiatives in Australia. Restorative justice models are used globally and have recently been introduced to school disciplinary policies in the US as an alternative approach to current punitive models, such as zero tolerance. The focus is on ensuring that students understand and learn from their behavior as well as take responsibility for their actions and participate in steps that aim to repair the harm done to relationships between the student and the school environment. Programs, such as restorative circles, restorative meetings, restorative youth courts, and peer mediation, are being used as alternatives to zero-tolerance policies and harsh disciplinary practices. The idea behind these programs is that students should be encouraged to participate in their punishments and school administration should refrain from using suspensions and expulsions for minor offenses. The goal of restorative programs is to keep students in school and to stop the flow of students from schools to the criminal justice system.

Some challenges to the use of restorative justice in schools are lack of time and community support. It requires balancing the time needed for mediation with the other demands of education in one school day. Scholars acknowledge that, to achieve proper, unbiased mediation, it will require training, support, and review. It is also crucial that an entire community—students, parents, teachers, staff, coaches, etc.—are convinced it is a better alternative and willing to work together.

Steven Teske, a juvenile court judge in Clayton County, Georgia, created the School-Justice Partnership model in 2003, known as the "Clayton County Model" or, informally, "The Teske Model", to reduce the arrests of students involving minor offenses by using a collaborative agreement between schools, law enforcement, and the courts. The model has three main components: identifying minor offenses not subject to referral to the court, defining the roles of school police and school administrators to avoid using police as disciplinarians, and creating restorative practices and education programs in lieu of arrests. It took aim at zero-tolerance policies which do not consider situational context or individual circumstances. The model's application in his county resulted in a 67-percent decline in referrals to juvenile court. Despite concerns by some that a softer approach would yield school safety issues, the data shows an increase in graduation rates of approximately 20 percent and an eight-percent decline in suspensions. The method has spread across the US with some notable cities such as Birmingham, Alabama, and Wichita, Kansas, seeing similar improvements.

=== Editorial policies of major media ===
Beginning especially in the 1970s, the mainstream commercial media in the US increased coverage of the police blotter, while reducing coverage of investigative journalism.

Advertising rates are set based on the audience. Because "if it bleeds, it leads", the media were able to accomplish this change without losing its audience.

Beyond this, the growth of private prisons increased the pool of major advertisers who could be offended by honest reporting on incarcerations and the SPP: it makes financial sense to report on this only to the extent that such reporting is needed to maintain an audience.

Media constructions have contributed to hysteria over youth violence and mass incarcerations. TV overrepresents violent crime and people of color as offenders. This creates a "culture of fear" and "mean world syndrome" that particularly works against Black or Latino males.

== Mental health relating to the SPP ==
Where there are undetected and untreated child mental health concerns, this can lead to unwanted suspensions and expulsions. When teachers include strategies to address the concerns found in students, it leads to students wanting to pursue their own academic achievement and success.

Students with diagnosable mental health problems suffer under zero-tolerance policies. Such policies aim to create safer classrooms by removing potential disruptions, but many in mental health, social services, courts, or other related fields believe they fail in this goal and may result in less safe schools and communities. School is considered a protective factor against "delinquent conduct" and removing students from such an environment harms their ability to succeed.

An American Psychological Association Zero Tolerance Task Force report found that "students with disabilities, especially those with emotional and behavioral disorders, appear to be suspended and expelled at rates disproportionate to the representation in the population".

Zero-tolerance policies also fail to account for neurological development in youths. Studies show that the brain is still "under construction" until at least age 25. Youth are more likely to take risks, act impulsively, and exercise poor judgment. When these actions result in their involvement with the criminal justice system, they are punished rather than taught how to develop.

One issue in improving mental health services in school and interrupting the SPP is that schools are unequipped to identify disorders and provide help for them.

== See also ==
- List of U.S. states by incarceration rate
- List of countries by incarceration rate
- Prison–industrial complex
- Kids for cash scandal
