= ZD =

Zd or ZD may refer to:

- Nissan ZD engine, an automobile engine
- Zero Defects, a management program to eliminate defects in industrial production, popular in American industry in the late 1960s
- Zero-defects mentality, in which a command-and-control structure does not tolerate mistakes
- Zertifikat Deutsch, a certificate of German language ability
- Ziff Davis, a magazine publisher and Internet information provider
- Zooey Deschanel, an American actress and musician
