= Zero tolerance (disambiguation) =

Zero tolerance is a type of punishment policy. The term can also refer to:

- Trump administration zero tolerance policy
- Zero tolerance (schools), the rule enforcement policy in North American schools
- Zero tolerance (trade), a regulatory standard
- Zero Tolerance (video game), a 1994 video game
- Zero Tolerance Recordings, a record label
- Zero Tolerance (album), a compilation album released under the name Chuck Schuldiner
- Zero Tolerance (1994 film), an American film starring Robert Patrick
- Zero Tolerance (1999 film), a Swedish film starring Jakob Eklund
- Zero Tolerance (2015 film), directed by Wych Kaosayananda
- "Zero Tolerance" (My Hero), a 2002 television episode
- Indian 2: Zero Tolerance, a 2024 Indian film
- Zero Tolerance Entertainment, a porn film producer
- Zero Tolerance (magazine), a bi-monthly British magazine focusing on extreme metal
- Operation: Zero Tolerance, a Marvel Comics storyline event
- Operation Zero Tolerance

== See also ==
- Zero Tolerence (later reissued as Zero Tolerance), a 2010 album by Pastor Troy
- Zero-defects mentality, a similar policy used in the military
- Intolerance (disambiguation)
