= School disturbance laws =

Series of state laws within the United States

School disturbance laws, also known as school disruption laws, are a series of state laws within the United States that prohibit and instill penalties for those found guilty of disturbing the operations of a school. In some states, merely "disturbing school" is a crime, with the law giving no further definition or guidance to those charged with enforcing the law. Enacted by states in the early 20th century to protect students from outside adults, since the Civil Rights Era they began to be used against students within the schools. As of 2017, there are over 20 states with these laws still in place, although they remain actively enforced by only some. It is reported that nationally, 10,000 juveniles are charged with "disturbing school" each year, in addition to those who are charged as adults. The application of these laws, including arrest, expulsion, and incarceration, are in many states part of the "school to prison pipeline," the channeling of students of all ages into the criminal justice program. This frequently has adverse effects on students' academic performance, ability to remain in the educational system, likelihood of adult incarceration, and their future success in society.

Criticism of the laws is widespread and has been so since as early as 1970. This includes concerns that the laws' vagueness gives enforcement officials too much discretion in interpretation which criminalizes classroom misbehavior that previously would have been handled through school discipline; they are applied unevenly, depending on the biases of those enforcing them; they are enforced disproportionately against students of color, with disabilities, and/or those identifying as LGBT; and they are a main tool of in-school police officers, many of whom are armed and whose training and attitudes – geared for adult law enforcement situations – have been found to be no more effective than non-criminal justice methods in ensuring safety in schools. A 2017 lawsuit claims one state's law "creates an impossible standard for school children to follow and for police to enforce with consistency and fairness".

Several incidents in the media recent years have highlighted the use of law enforcement in schools and the underlying disturbance laws. These include videos of a School Resource Officer in South Carolina high school dragging a student across the classroom for refusing to stop using her mobile phone, then arresting her and a fellow student for recording the incident; and an autistic 11-year-old student tackled to the ground by school security, then charged with felony assault for resisting. Numerous articles about these incidents have raised awareness of the school disturbance laws and their problems, including their broad interpretation and application, such as South Carolina's law which makes it a crime to "disturb school" or to "act in an obnoxious manner."

Studies in the early 21st century have questioned the effectiveness and fairness of the laws and their application. Several states revised their school disturbance laws to lessen the impact of the criminal justice system on students within schools.

== History ==
School Disturbance Laws have been in existence since at least as early as 1919, when a law was proposed in South Carolina, to address concerns of men flirting with students at an all-white women's college. The law prohibited any "obnoxious" behavior or "loiter[ing]" at any girls' school or college, with a penalty of up to a $100 fine or 30 days in jail. Similar laws appeared in many states along with laws to protect worship services or public meetings. In some states, they were written to ensure they applied only to non-students.

During the 1960s the laws began to evolve into their current form of applying to all schools. In 1967 after African American students protested against segregation in Orangeburg, South Carolina, it was proposed to change the law to prohibit obnoxious behavior at all schools in order to "keep(ing) outside agitators off campus," according to the bill's sponsor. Subsequent protests, including what became known as the Orangeburg Massacre where police shot 30 unarmed students and killed 3 African American teenagers, the law was signed into law. The President's Commission on Campus Unrest reported in 1970 that "more than 30 states had passed nearly 80 laws to counter student unrest". The law has since been used to permit the arrest of thousands of mostly African-American students who breach the law.

In 1969 the U.S. Supreme Court ruled that students had a right to protest peacefully on school grounds, as long as they did so without "materially and substantially" disturbing class. Until the 1970s, it had been a common practice for "problem youth" to be "pushed out" of the educational system. By the decade of the 1970s, court decisions began to stress that all had the right to an education within the educational system. It therefore resulted in students who had been found to be delinquent "could no longer legally be dismissed from school on the recommendation of a teacher or an administrator". School counselors were then tasked with working with behavioral and emotional problems with students who previously would have been expelled or sent to reform schools. (Cox & Conrad, 1978)"

School disturbance laws started to become integral to school discipline in the 1990s, in response to rising fears of school violence, high-profile shootings in schools (such as the Columbine High School massacre), and passage of "zero-tolerance laws" such as the Gun-Free Schools Act of 1994, following which many more police were installed in schools across the US. From the mid-1970s to 2008, the number of schools with police stationed on campus rose from approximately 1 percent to 40 percent."

In the early 21st century concerns about the laws and their application began to be addressed in some states. A 2011 study of nearly 1 million Texas students found that nearly 60% of students were suspended or expelled at least once between grades 7 and 12." In 2012, Texas changed the law such that students could no longer be charged with "disrupting class" and no student younger than 12 years could be charged with a "low-level misdemeanor at school". Additional steps requiring obtaining witness statements and writing formal complaints by officers were implemented.

In 2017 a law was proposed in South Carolina to urge educators and school administrators "to exhaust all avenues of behavioral discipline in accordance with the school's code of conduct prior to requesting the involvement of law enforcement officials." The law was passed and signed into law on May 17, 2018.

== By state ==
At least 21 states and dozens of cities and towns currently outlaw school disturbances in one way or another. Below is a partial list of states and districts with school disturbance laws and some of their details.

- Alabama
- Arizona
- Arkansas: bans "annoying conduct"
- California
- Connecticut
- Delaware
- Florida: it is a crime to "interfere with the lawful administration or functions of any educational institution" or to "advise" another student to do so.
- Georgia
- Indiana
- Kansas
- Kentucky
- Maine: interrupting a teacher by speaking loudly is a civil offense, punishable by up to a $500 fine.
- Maryland
- Nevada
- South Carolina
- South Dakota: prohibits "boisterous" behavior
- Texas
- Washington
- District of Columbia

In 2012, Texas curtailed their school disturbance law to no longer apply to students in their own schools, and to exclude students under the age of 12 from being charged with low-level misdemeanors. In May 2018, South Carolina's school-disturbance law was amended to apply only to former students who harm or threaten students or teachers in schools or colleges.

== Criticism of the laws ==
=== Vagueness and broad-scope ===
In several states, the school disturbance laws are not specific in defining what behavior or actions are covered, instead using far-reaching language such as "disorderly conduct", "disturbing a public assembly", or "act in an obnoxious behavior". In Maryland, lawmakers stated that their state's law "could be applied to a kindergarten pupil throwing a temper tantrum."

Concerns over the broad application of some school disturbance laws have led to calls for changes around the country for over four decades. In September 1970, the President's Commission on Campus Unrest warned of "antistudent and antiuniversity laws that range from the unnecessary and ill-directed to the purely vindictive."

=== Criminalization of behavior ===
The laws' application has led to a perception that normal adolescent misbehavior is being subjected to punishment by the criminal justice system instead of through traditional school disciplinary channels, that in some instances has rendered "all manner of common misbehavior illegal". A 2012 report on the criminalization of school discipline in Massachusetts noted that the state's "disturbing a lawful assembly" law has repeatedly been used to arrest students who act out, for bringing phones to school, swearing at school resource officers, and failing to identify themselves.

The increased application of the school disturbance laws have parallel the use of law enforcement officials as school resource officers based in schools. According to a 2017 analysis of 2,650 schools published in the Washington University Law Review, students at schools with police officers were significantly more likely to be reported to law enforcement for low-level offenses than students at schools without police, even after controlling for the neighborhood crime rate, the demographics of the schools, and a host of other variables. Most law-enforcement officials are trained to address adult criminal behavior, to assert authority, and to take control of a situation. That often have limited training or understanding of issues of child development and psychology. As a result, the way they address student behavioral issues can have a detrimental effect on the student population and school as a whole."

Some notable recent examples:

- In 2011, a 13-year-old student in New Mexico was arrested for repeatedly fake-burping in class. The courts ruled that "burping, laughing, and leaning into the classroom stopped the flow of student educational activities, thereby injecting disorder into the learning environment."
- In Alabama, a court ruled that a "student had disturbed school because his principal had had to meet with him to discuss his behavior". The ruled was overturned on appeals."
- In a widely shared video, a School Resource Officer in Spring Valley High School in South Carolina, a school resource officer was called into a classroom after a student refused to stop using her mobile phone. After the student refused to comply with the SRO's order, he dragged the student and her desk across the classroom, arrested the student and charged her with a crime. Another student who recorded the altercation was arrested and charged with a similar crime. Numerous articles about this incident have raised awareness of the school disturbance laws and their problems, including their details, such as South Carolina's where it is a crime to "disturb school" or to "act in an obnoxious manner."
- In 2015, an autistic 11-year-old middle school student in Lynchburg, Virginia, was arrested for an incident that began with the kicking of a trash can, which resulted in the student being grabbed, slammed to the ground, and taken away in handcuffs. He was charged with disorderly conduct and later with felony assault on a police officer.
- In 2019, an 11-year-old student in Lakewood, Florida was arrested after refusing to stand for the Pledge of Allegiance. The teacher called the main office because she "did not want to continue dealing with him." The boy was charged with disrupting a school function and resisting arrest without violence.

Some law enforcement officials have criticized this approach. South Carolina's Richland County Sheriff Leon Lott stated: "Too often, these teachers in these schools are calling on the cops because they have a disruptive student in the classroom." "This is not a cop's job." "We don't need to arrest these students." "We need to keep them in schools."

=== Disparities in enforcement ===
Studies dating back to the 1980s have shown that students of color and those with learning disabilities are disproportionately affected by school policing policies and practices than are Caucasian or fully able-bodied students, even after accounting for socioeconomic conditions that may affect behavior; they are more frequently disciplined for minor public order offenses. According to a University of Chicago analysis, African-American students are less likely to commit offenses worthy of expulsion or arrest. A 2011 study by the New York Civil Liberties Union shows that youth with disabilities are four times as likely to be suspended as their peers without disabilities. A 2011 report by the Justice Policy Institute outlined multiple factors contributing to this disparity, including a reliance on law enforcement to enforce school discipline.

Concerns over racially based application of these laws have fueled the push for changes around the country from government officials in the Nixon and Obama administrations." In 1970 the President's Commission on Campus Unrest report warned that "legislators in a majority of states have passed antistudent and antiuniversity laws that range from the unnecessary and ill-directed to the purely vindictive."

The laws and their current enforcement have been criticized as being a response to integration in schools. Public calls for "segregation forever" were replaced with calls for "law and order", as documented by Michelle Alexander, author of The New Jim Crow. A 2015 study by a Pennsylvania State researcher found that nationally, for the same offenses, white students are referred for treatment or counseling while African American students are sent into the criminal justice system. "White kids tend to get viewed as having ADHD, or having some sort of behavioral problem, while black kids are viewed as being unruly and unwilling to learn."

=== Diverting resources ===
Some groups have expressed concern that the hiring of law enforcement officials to enforce routine discipline has taken resources away from student support services such as counselors, social workers, and others who are better equipped to address some of the behavioral issues before they escalate to needing police intervention.

=== Effectiveness of the laws ===
Recent studies and developments have concluded that the presence in schools of law enforcement officers, in particular those ones who use arrest to address issues of student discipline, do not make schools safer. A 2011 report by the Consortium on Chicago School Research at the University of Chicago, found that school safety is promoted more by the kind of relationships police forge with teachers and students than the number of arrests they make." In 2012, after Texas changed its school disturbance law, the number of charges filed for minor offenses such as disrupting class dropped 61 percent, or 40,000. The number of juveniles arrested for violent crimes, the number of expulsion, and serious disciplinary actions in schools, continued to fall."

=== Military weapons ===
Civil rights groups have expressed concern about providing military-grade weapons to law enforcement officials in school who are perceived to be inappropriately using their authority granted by school disturbance laws. "Arming school police with military-grade weapons and gear creates the potential to contribute to climates that students of color already experience as hostile, and contributes to the normalization of the criminalization of these youth, worsening educational outcomes, and producing no public safety benefits." The U.S. Department of Defense's 1033 surplus equipment program has since 1997 donated local and school police with over $5 billion surplus equipment, including armored vehicles, M-14 and M-16 semiautomatic rifles, extended magazines, automatic pistols, tactical vests, SWAT gear, Mine-Resistant Ambush Protected (MRAP) vehicles, and grenade launchers (used for launching tear gas). School police in at least 22 districts have received such weapons in eight states: California, Florida, Georgia, Kansas, Michigan, Nevada, Texas, and Utah. The Defense Department stated that these school districts would likely only use this equipment in cooperation with other law-enforcement agencies. This program was suspended by the Obama administration in 2014 after the Ferguson unrest and restored in 2017 under the Trump administration.

== See also ==
- Classroom management
- Education law
- School-to-prison pipeline
- Victimology
