= 2006 Harris County, Texas hate crime assault =

Racially motivated crime in Texas, United States

The 2006 Harris County, Texas hate crime assault was the beating, torture, and sexual assault of a Latino student, by two non-Latino white youths during the early morning of April 22, 2006, in an unincorporated section of Harris County, Texas, United States in Greater Houston. The details of the attack led to the publication of the story in various media outlets in and outside the United States. The victim of the assault, whose identity was not made public until months after the attack, committed suicide a year after the incident.

== The assault ==
David Ritcheson, the victim of the attack

The incident occurred at a residence located north of the city of Houston, with a Spring, Texas address, at a party held at the Sons family home. Two Klein Collins High School students, David Henry Tuck, then 18, and Keith Robert Turner, then 17, beat, tortured and sodomized David Ritcheson, a 16-year-old fellow Klein Collins student and former running back for the school's football team.

Tuck and Turner, who were both under the influence of recreational drugs, said they were told that Ritcheson, also under the influence of drugs, tried to kiss 12-year-old Danielle Sons. Sons' statement threw Tuck into a rage, and Tuck punched Ritcheson. The first punch was so powerful it broke Ritcheson's cheekbone and knocked him unconscious, stated Dr. Red Duke, the emergency physician who treated him.

Tuck and Turner dragged Ritcheson outside, stripped him naked, burned him with cigarettes, and attempted to engrave a swastika into Ritcheson's chest. Tuck kicked Ritcheson with steel-toed boots and forced the pointed end of a PVC patio umbrella pole up his rectum several inches while yelling racial slurs. After the sodomy ended, the perpetrators poured bleach on the victim's body to conceal the evidence of the crime. The attack lasted five hours. Ritcheson was left lying behind the house for more than 10 hours before he was found and an ambulance was called. Ritcheson suffered from extensive injuries including a perforated bladder. The night after the assault, Ritcheson's lungs failed, and he was placed on a ventilator. According to Harris County prosecutor Mike Trent, the attackers may have poured bleach inside the pipe as high levels of toxins were found in Ritcheson's organs.

== Aftermath ==
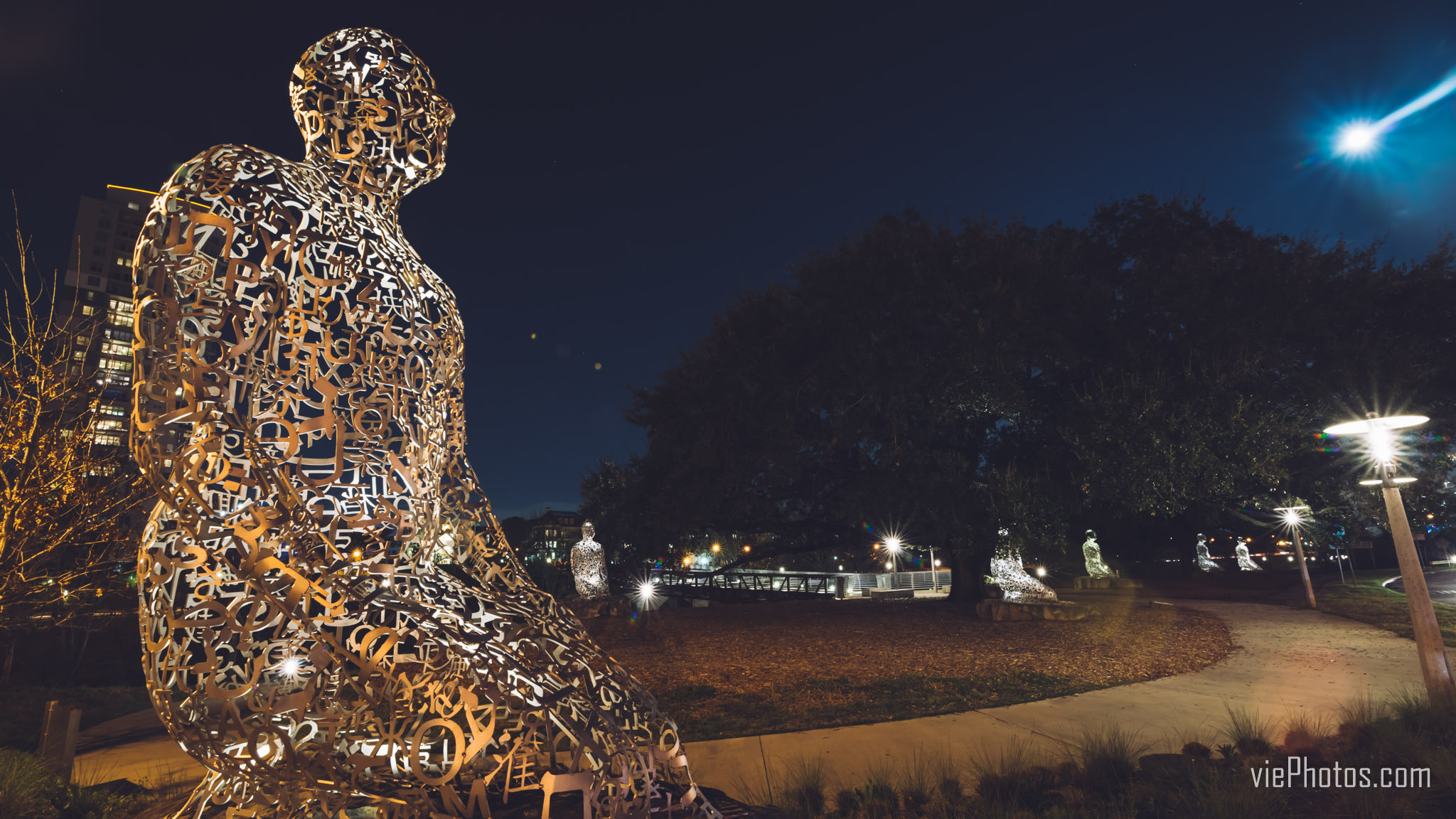
Tolerance sculpture by Jaume Plensa, installed in Houston in 2011

=== Conviction and legal punishment ===
After being contacted by the Anti-Defamation League (ADL) and agreeing to make his name public, Ritcheson went to Washington, D.C., and on April 17, 2007, testified to the United States House of Representatives Judiciary Subcommittee about passing more stringent hate crime laws.

In December 2006, Tuck and Turner were both convicted of aggravated sexual assault. Tuck, who was described by prosecutors as a white supremacist, was sentenced to life in prison, and Turner was sentenced to 90 years. Turner unsuccessfully appealed his conviction to the 14th Court of Appeals for the State of Texas. On March 20, 2008, the Court of Appeals issued its opinion affirming Turner's conviction. Both Tuck and Turner must serve at least 30 years before becoming eligible for parole.

As of 2015 Tuck is incarcerated at the Ramsey Unit of the Texas Department of Criminal Justice (TDCJ) and has the TDCJ ID 01403389. His parole eligibility date is April 22, 2036. As of 2015 Turner is incarcerated at the Wallace Pack Unit and has the TDCJ ID 01404515. Turner's parole eligibility date is April 24, 2036, and his tentative release date is April 24, 2096.

=== Hospitalization ===
After a lengthy recovery, which included a three-month stint in the hospital and more than 12 surgeries, Ritcheson refused professional counseling and never spoke about his experiences with his friends. During an interview with the Houston Chronicle, Ritcheson stated:

I shouldn't care what people think. But it's like everyone knows I'm 'the kid'. I don't want to be a standout because of what happened.

=== Death ===
On the morning of July 1, 2007, Ritcheson committed suicide by jumping from the deck of the Carnival Ecstasy, a cruise ship bound for the Mexican resort island of Cozumel. He was 18 years old. The Ritcheson family's attorney, Carlos Leon, confirmed his death.

In 2011, Houston installed the Tolerance sculpture, a project initiated in response to Ritcheson's assault.
