= Toleration Act =

Toleration Act may refer to:

- Maryland Toleration Act, a 1649 law mandating religious tolerance for Trinitarian Christians
- Toleration Act 1689, an Act of the Parliament of England
- Toleration Act 1719, an Act of the Parliament of Ireland

== See also ==
- Occasional Conformity Act 1711 or the Tolerance Act
