= Intolerance =

Intolerance may refer to:

- Hypersensitivity or intolerance, undesirable reactions produced by the immune system
- Intolerance (film), a 1916 film by D. W. Griffith
- Intolerance (album), the first solo album from Grant Hart, formerly of the band Hüsker Dü
- Intolerance, a 1984 album by Tik & Tok
- "Intolerance", a song by Tool from the album Undertow
- "Intolerance" (Doctors), a 2004 television episode

== See also ==
- Tolerance (disambiguation)
