= Tolerance (sculpture) =

Sculpture by Jaume Plensa in Houston, Texas, U.S.

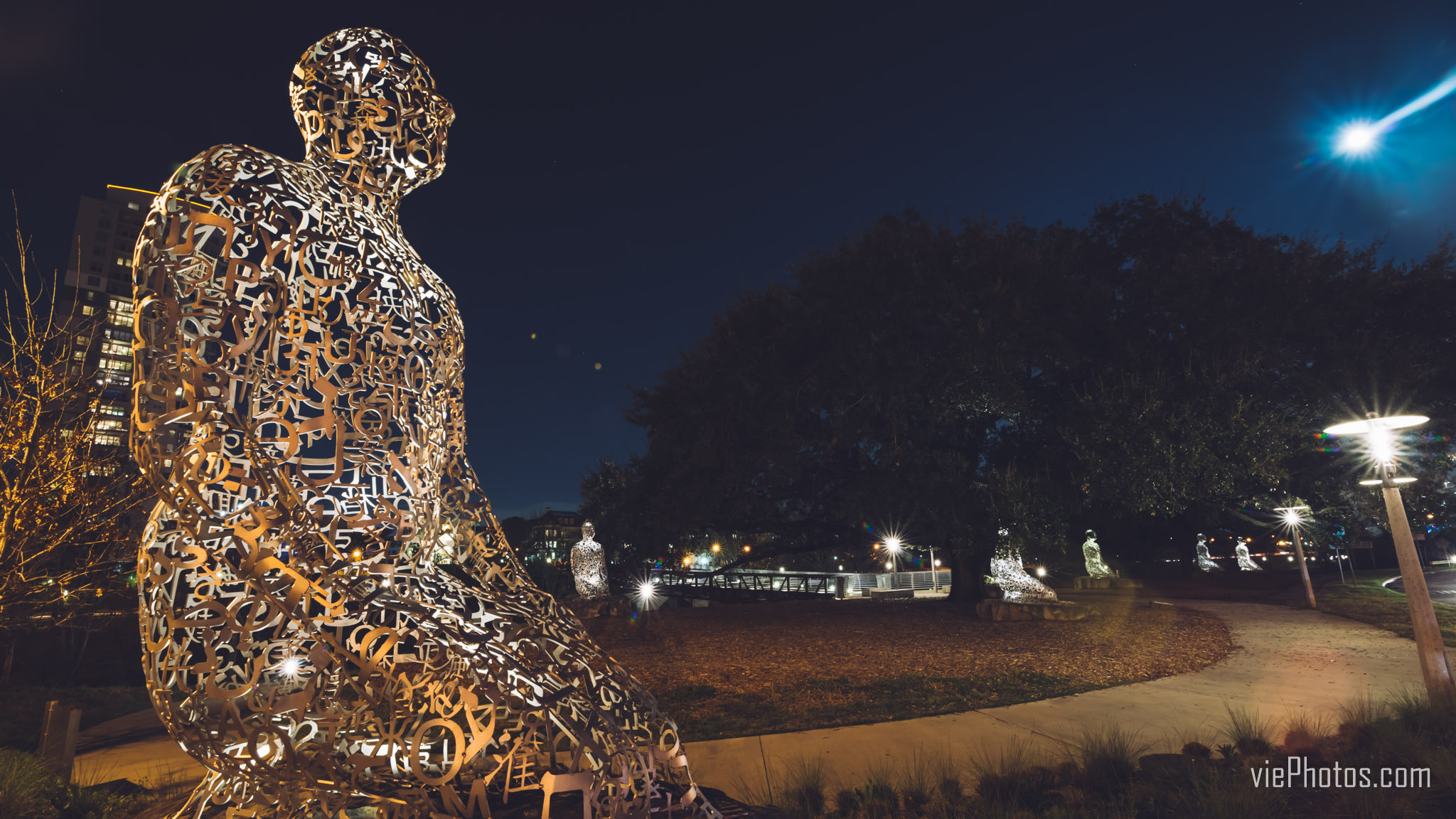
- One figure of the Tolerance sculpture
- Artist: Jaume Plensa
- Year: 2011
- Type: Sculpture
- Medium: Aluminum, granite
- Location: Houston, Texas, United States; 29.761926°N 95.391763°W

Tolerance is an outdoor aluminum and granite sculpture in Houston. Internationally-renowned Spanish sculptor Jaume Plensa was commissioned to create the sculpture by the Houston Arts Alliance in 2009, and it was installed as part of Harmony Walk at Buffalo Bayou Park in 2011.

The seven figures represent the seven continents. Each figure is about 10 feet tall and composed of metal mesh of letters from many languages. They kneel on Spanish granite boulders which are the main difference between each of the figures. At night, they are lit from within.

The project was initiated after the 2006 hate crime assault of David Ritcheson, who courageously testified before Congress about passing more stringent hate crime laws, and then committed suicide a few months later. The Aga Khan Foundation and Robert Mosbacher's widow Mica Mosbacher were instrumental in bringing the project to fruition. At the dedication, Mosbacher said, "In contemplating how in some small way I could help to right that wrong, I began to think about Houston, and that in Houston our city is an open city, and those are not part of our values. We are tolerant, we embrace other cultures, and in fact, those other cultures have been the engines of our healthy and prosperous economy."

== Other works by Plensa in the Houston area ==
Also in 2011, Jaume Plensa's Mirror was permanently installed on the Rice University campus. It has two seated figures similarly composed of a metal mesh of letters.

== See also ==
- 2011 in art
- List of public art in Houston
