= Joe Jamail =

American lawyer

Joseph D. Jamail Jr.
- Born: Joseph Dahr Jamail Jr. October 19, 1925; Houston, Texas, U.S.
- Died: December 23, 2015 (aged 90); Houston, Texas, U.S.
- Education: University of Texas at Austin (BA); University of Texas School of Law (JD)
- Occupation: Attorney

Joseph Dahr Jamail Jr. (October 19, 1925 – December 23, 2015) was an American attorney and billionaire. As the wealthiest practicing attorney in America, he was frequently referred to as the "King of Torts".

In 2015, his net worth was estimated by Forbes to be $1.7 billion. Jamail died on December 23, 2015, in Houston, TX from complications related to pneumonia.

== Early life and education ==
Jamail was born to a Lebanese family. He was a graduate of St. Thomas High School in Houston, Texas. He attended the University of Texas at Austin (UT) for one semester before joining the United States Marine Corps in 1943.

After serving in the Pacific during World War II, Jamail returned to UT, where he received his B.A. in 1950. He then attended the University of Texas School of Law, where he received his J.D. in 1953. In 1986, the University of Texas School of Law created the Joseph D. Jamail Centennial Chair in Law and Advocacy in his honor. His son is also a practicing lawyer in Texas.

== Career ==
In 1985, Jamail represented Pennzoil, whose CEO Hugh Liedtke was Jamail's close friend, in a lawsuit against Texaco. Pennzoil won the case and his contingency fee was $335 million.

Jamail was known for his passionate, aggressive, sometimes abrasive advocacy on behalf of his clients; a tendency that has been noted in the National Law Journal, by the Delaware Supreme Court as well as other sources.

On its own motion, having reviewed deposition transcripts in the Paramount Communications, Inc. v. QVC Network, Inc. case, the Delaware Supreme Court wrote that "Mr. Jamail abused the privilege of representing a witness in a Delaware proceeding, in that he: (a) improperly directed the witness not to answer certain questions; (b) was extraordinarily rude, uncivil, and vulgar; and (c) obstructed the ability of the questioner to elicit testimony to assist the Court . . . ." One of Jamail's statements that the court pointed to, in the deposition transcript, was Jamail's statement to deposing counsel that "you could gag a maggot off a meatwagon." The court included its admonition of Jamail in an Addendum to its opinion "as a lesson for the future—a lesson of conduct not to be tolerated or repeated." In April 2006, a particularly sharp exchange, titled "Joe Jamail takes a deposition defended by Edward Carstarphen. Hilarity ensues" or "Texas-Style Deposition," appeared on various blogs and internet sites (particularly related to American law). Following a reprimand by the Delaware Supreme Court, Jamail stated in the press "I'd rather have a nose on my ass than go to Delaware for any reason."

== Charity ==
Jamail made large donations to Rice University and the University of Texas at Austin. The football field at Darrell K. Royal–Texas Memorial Stadium was named Joe Jamail Field in his honor. However, on July 13, 2020, it was announced that the field would be renamed to the Earl Campbell-Ricky Williams Field at the Jamail family's request. The Joseph D. Jamail Jr. Pavilion at the University of Texas School of Law is named after him. Also located on the University of Texas campus is the Lee and Joe Jamail Texas Swimming Center, named for him and his wife. The university has erected two statues on campus in his honor.

On May 14, 2008, The University of Texas at Austin announced a $15 million gift from Joe Jamail to support the law school, nursing school, and the college of undergraduate studies. In response to the gift, the university renamed a large meeting room in the tower building to the Lee Hage Jamail Academic Room.

In 2008, the Lee and Joe Jamail Skatepark opened near downtown Houston. It was a $2.7 million project, and is open to the public.

On April 27, 2011, the San Marcos Baptist Academy announced a $1 million gift from Joe Jamail to help establish a fund to build a special event center on the academy campus in memory of Jamail's wife, Lee, who graduated from San Marcos Academy in 1944.
