= Lee and Joe Jamail Skatepark =

Public skatepark in Houston, Texas

Coordinates: 29.7621°N 95.3768°W

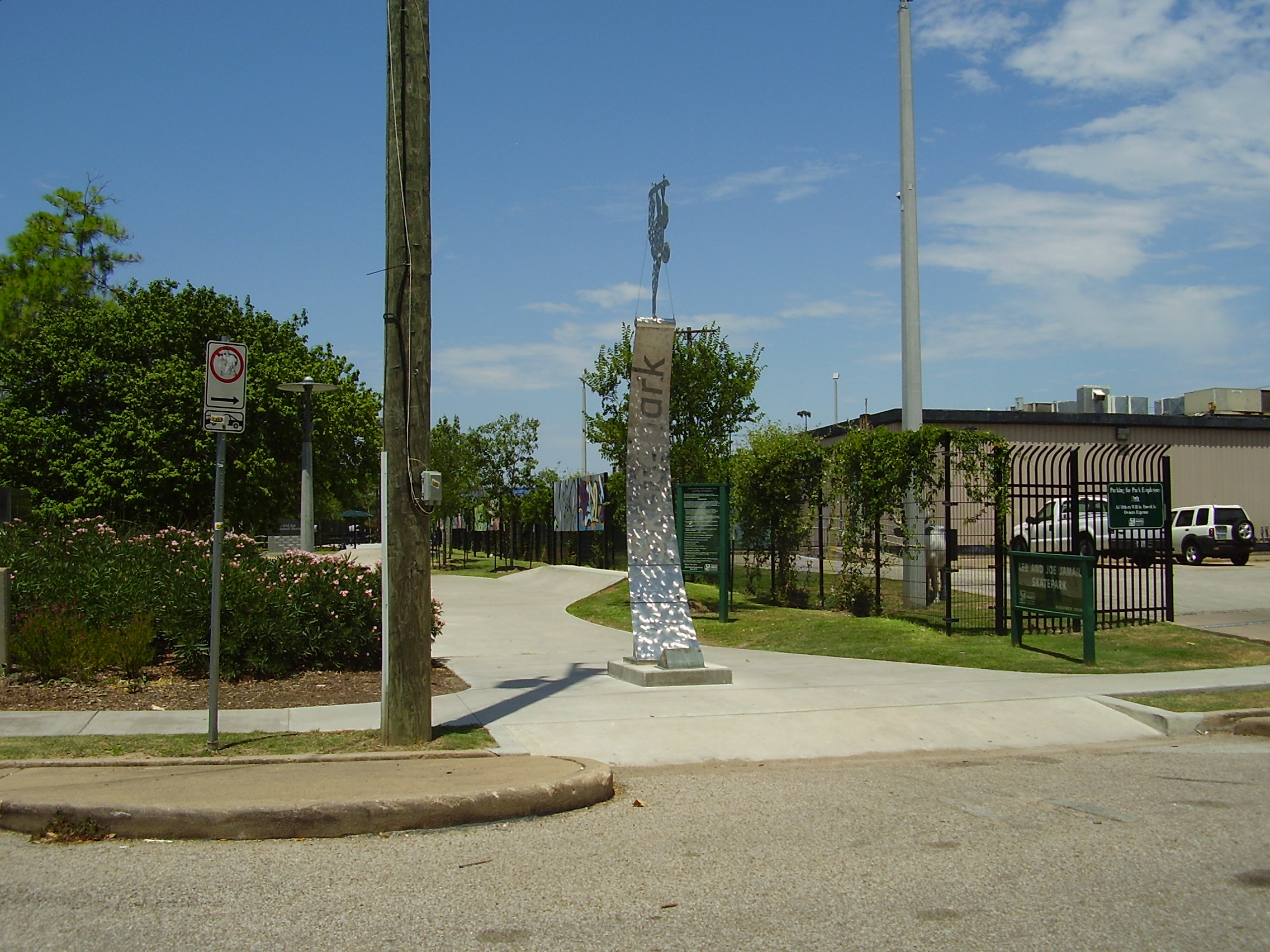
Lee and Joe Jamail Skatepark

The Lee and Joe Jamail Skatepark is a public skatepark in Houston, Texas, United States. The $2.7 million project opened in June 2008. At over 40,000 square feet (3,700 m2), it is one of the largest in Texas. It has two cradles, one of which is thought to be the largest in the United States, as well as a kidney pool, a large bowl with 12.5 ft (3.8 m) deep end and a street/flow area. The park was designed by Gridline Concrete Skatepark Design. The facility is free to the public. BMX bikes are not permitted. It is named after Texas billionaire lawyer Joe Jamail and his wife Lee. The Lee and Joe Jamail Skatepark is located at 103 Sabine Street Houston, TX 77007, on the Sabine Street bridge with a view of the Houston skyline.

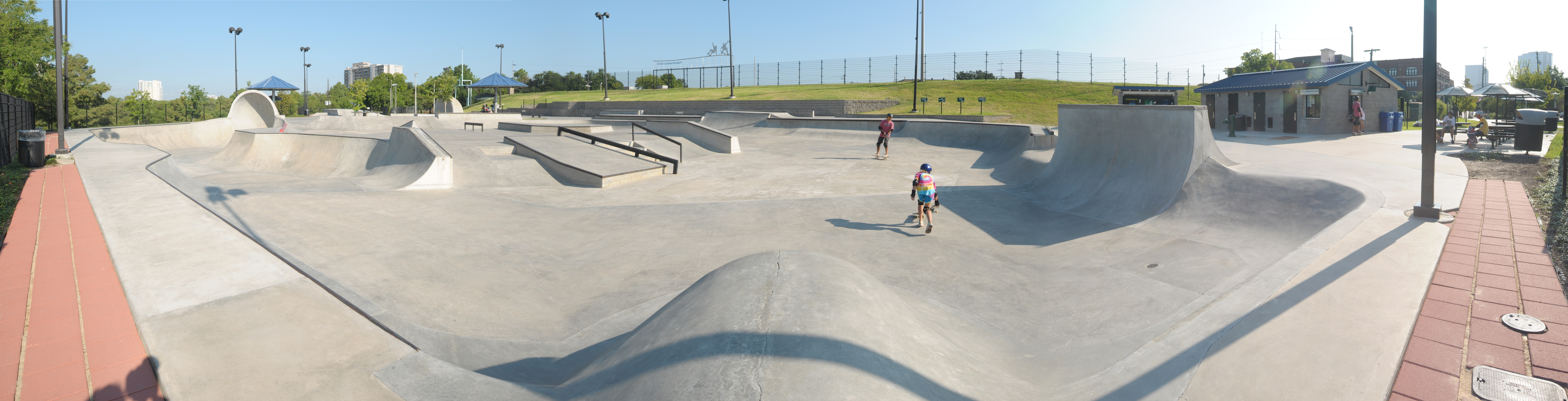
Lee and Joe Jamail Skatepark
