= Gun-Free Schools Act of 1994 =

- Other short titles: Improving America's Schools Act of 1994
- Long title: To extend for six years the authorizations of appropriations for the programs under the Elementary and Secondary Education Act of 1965, and for other purposes
- Acronyms (colloquial): GFSA
- Enacted by: the 103rd United States Congress

Citations
- Public law: Pub. L. 103–382
- Statutes at Large: 108 Stat. 3518

Codification
- Acts amended: Elementary and Secondary Education Act of 1965
- Titles amended: Title 20 of the United States Code: Education

Legislative history
- Introduced in the House as H.R. 6 by Rep. Dale E. Kildee D‑MI on January 5, 1993; Committee consideration by House Education and Labor; Senate Labor and Human Resources; Passed the House on March 24, 1994 (289–146); Passed the Senate on October 7, 1994 (74–24); Agreed to by the House on October 8, 1994 (310–112); Signed into law by President Bill Clinton on March 31, 1994

United States Supreme Court cases
- Goss v. Lopez

The Gun-Free Schools Act of 1994 (GFSA) was part of the Improving America's Schools Act of 1994 (IASA). The Gun-Free Schools Act of 1994 also amends the Elementary and Secondary Education Act of 1965.

In 1994, Congress introduced the Gun-Free Schools Act of 1994, which encouraged each state receiving federal funds for education to follow suit and introduce their own laws, now known as zero-tolerance laws. President Bill Clinton signed the Gun-Free Schools Act of 1994 into law on March 31, 1994. The Gun-Free Schools Act of 1994 requires each state receiving federal funds to have a state law in effect requiring local educational agencies to expel, for at least one year, any student who is determined to have brought a weapon to school. The one-year expulsion is mandatory, except when a chief administering officer of such local education agency may modify it on a case-by-case basis. In addition, schools are directed to develop policies requiring referral to the criminal justice or juvenile delinquency system for any student who brings a firearm or weapon to school.

== Criticisms ==
The Gun-Free Schools Act of 1994 and the state laws passed in pursuance thereof "zero tolerance" laws, must afford the maximum amount of procedural due process to the student who are expelled for bringing a weapon to school. The Gun-Free Schools Act of 1994 makes no mention or provision for procedural due process, except to make a provision for adherence to the Individual with Disabilities Education Act. States lack uniformity in the procedural process prior to the one-year expulsion. Some states, such as West Virginia, offer formal procedural due process procedures, while others, such as Utah, offer limited procedural due process. Procedural due process further requires that orderly and legally defensible procedural steps be employed in depriving students. The U.S. Supreme Court determined in Goss v. Lopez that students facing suspensions of up to 10 days or less were entitled to oral or written notice of charges, an explanation of evidence to be used against them and an opportunity to present their side of the issue. Another concern expressed was that it would fail to reach private schools that do not receive federal support and would therefore fail to achieve its goal.

== Comparison ==
These laws have the potential of imposing strict and harsh punishment upon school children that are not dangerous and will only suffer detrimental results from a full year expulsion. In addition, these laws do not prevent school violence. The shield for students offered by the Gun-Free Schools Act of 1994 stops the moment the line between school property and public property is crossed. And in fact, there is no "shield" offered by the Gun-Free Schools Act of 1994, as the act does nothing to prevent a student or person who is committed to perpetuating a violent attack from bringing a weapon to a school with which to commit said violent attack. The act is not preventive but merely punitive. To violate the act, the weapon must be brought on to the schools grounds.

== See also ==
- Gun law in the United States
- Gun politics in the United States
