= Zero-defects mentality =

A zero-defects mentality (also known as Zero Error Syndrome) exists when a command-and-control structure does not tolerate mistakes. This atmosphere is now widely acknowledged to be ineffective in both military and corporate life.

The results of a zero-defects mentality can include careerism, reduced motivation and stifled innovation. Soldiers or employees will feel neither empowered by their successes nor accountable for their failures.

Eliminating a zero-defects mentality is one of the primary goals of lean manufacturing, specifically through the application of Kaizen and Andon in the Toyota Production System.

== See also ==
- Zero defects
- Zero tolerance (disambiguation), the civilian version
