= School district drug policies =

Measures to discourage student drug use

School district drug policies are measures that administrators of a school district put into place to discourage drug use by students.

== Background ==
Over the decades of the war on drugs in the United States, primary and secondary school drug and alcohol policies have become increasingly strict, in punishment and in the kinds of behavior regulated. Some school districts include off-campus and out-of-school behavior in their policy's jurisdiction. These policies are frequently part of comprehensive "Drug and alcohol" policies, and are particularly common in urban school districts.

Aspects of the policies may include random drug testing, searches of lockers and personal effects, anti-drug education (e.g., "Just Say No" curricula), and punitive measures including expulsion and suspension.

Advocates of random drug testing argue that it is not just a punitive measure, but may deter drug use. Opponents, however, have argued that drugs commonly used by students, such as alcohol, MDMA, and prescription drugs are either not detected by the tests or are metabolized within a short period of time.

There are about 600 school districts in about 15,000 nationwide that use drug tests, according to officials from the White House Office of National Drug Control Policy. White House officials liken drug testing to programs that screen for tuberculosis or other diseases, and said students who test positive don't face criminal charges.

== Legal challenges ==
Civil libertarians have raised concerns with these policies, citing student civil rights and student privacy as principle objections. These cases have resulted in a number of legal challenges in the United States, as well as in related case law (e.g., Morse v. Frederick, the so-called "Bong Hits 4 Jesus" case").

In a 1995 case, Vernonia School District 47J v. Acton, the Supreme Court upheld the legality of random drug tests of student athletes who were not suspected of drug use. The Court reasoned that because school athletes routinely face mandatory physicals and other similar invasions of privacy, they have lower expectations of privacy than the average student. The Court specified that its decision should not be seen as a justification for further expansion of drug testing programs.

In the 2002 case Board of Education v. Earls the Supreme Court extended the holding in Vernonia, holding that all students who participate in voluntary activities, like cheerleading, band, or debate, could be subjected to random tests as part of a comprehensive program. The Court, in an opinion by Justice Thomas, stated that the diminished expectations of privacy of athletes was less important to their decision in Vernonia than a school's innate custodial responsibility and authority over its students.

In December 2009, a challenge was made to the Haddonfield, New Jersey, Board of Education's 24/7 policy regulating drug and alcohol use of students outside of school property and off school time. The lawsuit contends that the Board of Education does not have the authority to discipline students unless the conduct in question has some connection to school safety and discipline. A federal judge denied a request to stop the policy because the student who filed the lawsuit had already graduated. In 2012, the plaintiff's lawyer convinced a different judge to find that the school's 24/7 policy was illegal and the judge found that Haddonfield’s policy fails to differentiate between off-campus offenses that simply break the law and those that affect the school district’s ability to provide a safe environment. The NJ Commissioner of Education then reviewed the policy. In 2013, after the Commissioner of Education ruled against the Haddonfield School Board, the Board voted to scrap the policy for good.

== Case study ==
In late 2001, in Ashland, Oregon, the Ashland School Board enacted a Drug and Alcohol Policy for students in leadership positions, igniting a local controversy. The policy extended to off-campus and after-school conduct, but the controversy reached the general efficacy and constitutionality of drug testing policies.

Opposing the policy were local student groups and the local Oregon American Civil Liberties Union, which had advocated on behalf of various students expelled by the Ashland School District for drug use in May 2001 at a national forensics tournament. Students at Ashland High School argued that their off campus behavior after school hours should have no effect on their academic standing.

To resolve the dispute, a community committee was formed, meeting for five months. The committee's recommendations led to a rewriting of the Code of Conduct and a re-evaluation of the School District's entire Drug and Alcohol Policy.

== See also ==
- Legal issues of cannabis
- November Coalition
- Prohibition (drugs)
- Students for Sensible Drug Policy
- Zero-tolerance policy
- Drug policy reform
