= Juan Segundo =

Juan Segundo may refer to:

- Juan Segundo (murderer) (born 1963), American serial killer and rapist
- Juan Luis Segundo (1925–1996), Jesuit priest and theologian
