= Juan Segundo (murderer) =

American serial killer and rapist

- Born: Juan Ramon Segundo Meza; January 25, 1963 (age 63); Los Angeles, California, U.S.
- Convictions: Capital murder Driving under the influence Burglary of a habitat
- Penalty: Death; commuted to life imprisonment

Details
- Victims: 4+
- Span of crimes: August 3, 1986 – June 17, 1995
- Country: United States
- State: Texas
- Date apprehended: April 19, 2005
- Imprisoned at: Coffield Unit

Juan Ramon Segundo Meza (born January 25, 1963) is an American serial killer and rapist convicted of the 1986 murder of Vanessa Villa, 11, in Fort Worth, Texas. Segundo was arrested in 2005 after his DNA profile was found to match semen collected from Villa's crime scene. He received the death penalty in 2006. Between 2005 and 2010, Segundo was also linked by DNA to three unsolved murders that occurred in the Fort Worth area in the mid-1990s.

Segundo received an execution date in 2018, but the execution was stayed because of questions over how Texas courts make determinations of intellectual disability. In May 2022, the Texas Court of Criminal Appeals resentenced him to life in prison with the possibility of parole because he is considered to be intellectually disabled under the criteria in place today.

== Early life ==
Segundo was born in California on January 25, 1963. Around the time of his first birthday, Segundo moved with his mother and two brothers to El Paso, Texas, to get away from Segundo's abusive father. The family lived in a small apartment with no running water. Segundo's mother sometimes left the children alone for several days at a time, and Segundo's eight-year-old brother had to look for food in trash bins. The brothers were once placed in an orphanage before being returned to their mother. Segundo's mother later married an alcoholic who was abusive toward Segundo and his brothers.

According to court testimony from his brother, Segundo fell down some stairs when he was a small child, striking his head and experiencing convulsions. Thereafter, according to his brother, he acted "kind of slow" and was "always in a daze". He attended school until seventh grade.

== Murder of Vanessa Villa ==
Vanessa Villa (October 3, 1974 – August 4, 1986) was an 11-year-old girl living in Fort Worth with her mother and two siblings at the time of her death. She was regarded as being hard-working in school, despite not having mastered English, and was well liked by the staff there. Vanessa had expressed fear at the high crime rate in her Fort Worth neighborhood. She wrote a note asking her mother to "take me from this place" and left it inside a dictionary, where it was found after her death.

On the day of the killing, a Sunday, she had gone to a flea market in Dallas where she worked before returning home later in the day. That night, Segundo broke into the family home while Villa's mother and siblings were running an errand. In newspaper reports right after Vanessa's death, the family was said to have left the home for 20 minutes, but subsequent reports said that the family left for about an hour. When they returned, Villa's mother found her unconscious in her bedroom. Three cousins were in the home but remained asleep during the attack. Vanessa was pronounced dead at a local hospital in the early hours of August 4.

The following Sunday, August 10, the family held a wake for Vanessa at the family home. Segundo is alleged to have attended the ceremony. Vanessa's mother and two other relatives had worked with Segundo's ex-wife at a Lake Worth nursing home, and they considered Segundo to be a friend.

== Subsequent crimes ==
Segundo's next known crime took place on October 6, 1987, when an unnamed woman woke up to find herself being fondled by him. Segundo physically assaulted her and fled as the woman's daughter woke up. The victim's daughter identified Segundo as a former coworker, and in June 1988 he was sentenced to 10 years for burglary of a dwelling in connection with the incident. Segundo was paroled in July 1989, but in 1990 he entered a woman's home while he was not wearing any clothes. When the woman woke up, Segundo attempted to choke her and then jumped out of a second-story window. The victim recognized Segundo because he had dated several women in her neighborhood. For that attack, he was sent back to prison from 1991 until his parole in 1993.

Segundo was also linked to three cold case murders by DNA. The three killings took place over the course of nine months in the mid-1990s.

- Melissa Badillo, 23, was kidnapped and killed in September 1994. Segundo was linked to her death by DNA in 2010 while he was on death row.
- Francis Williams, a convicted prostitute, was found dead in a drainage ditch on November 15, 1994. She was identified as one of Segundo's victims before his capital trial.
- Maria Reyna Navarro, 32, was kidnapped on June 16, 1995. Her body was found the following day in Buck Sansom Park. Her killing was linked to Segundo in December 2005.

Segundo served five years in prison for driving while intoxicated. He was paroled in 2000 and released from supervision a month later. Segundo was released to a halfway house and then went to live with one of his brothers in Keene, Texas. Segundo became involved in a local church and married a woman from that congregation in 2001. One of Segundo's stepbrothers said that their relationship had been strained before Segundo's imprisonment, but he said that they had grown closer since Segundo had been paroled. He said that Segundo had started a lawn care business and had stopped abusing alcohol.

== Arrest, conviction, and subsequent proceedings ==
While Segundo was serving one of his prison sentences, a blood sample was taken from him so that his DNA profile could be entered into the Combined DNA Index System (CODIS), a database that compares the DNA of convicted criminals with evidence from unsolved crimes. In early 2005, Fort Worth forensic investigators were reviewing cold cases and decided to enter some crime scene evidence from Villa's murder into CODIS. Shortly thereafter, they were notified of a CODIS match between Segundo's DNA and semen from Villa's murder scene.

Segundo was tried for capital murder in Villa's death. Testifying witnesses included a deputy chief medical examiner for Tarrant County; an expert on DNA analysis; an expert on child sexual abuse; and the director of the CODIS program. Prosecutors also suggested that Segundo might be responsible for additional unsolved crimes, and they called Segundo's ex-wife to testify that Segundo had come home covered in blood one night in 1983. When Segundo would not tell his ex-wife where he had been that night, she searched his car and found an unfamiliar purse and a pair of panties under the passenger seat. Defense attorneys attempted to highlight lapses in evidence handling. The deputy chief medical examiner said he did not know if photos had been developed from Villa's autopsy. One of the crime scene investigators said he could not find his notes related to the investigation. Segundo was found guilty of Villa's murder.

During the sentencing phase, prosecution witnesses included two victims associated with Segundo's previous assault convictions. Additionally, a 21-year-old woman testified that she had recently notified authorities that when she was four or five years old, Segundo repeatedly sexually abused her while he was dating her mother. Defense attorneys brought up Segundo's difficult childhood, his head injury, and his low IQ. Segundo was condemned to death when the jury found no factors in his background that would make life imprisonment a more appropriate sentence.

Segundo's final appeal to the U.S. Supreme Court was denied in February 2017. On May 16, 2018, during the press debrief following the execution of San Antonio murderer Juan Castillo, Texas Department of Criminal Justice spokesman Jeremy Desel announced that Segundo and another inmate from Fort Worth, Kwame Rockwell, had been given execution dates for October 2018. Segundo was scheduled to die by lethal injection on October 10, 2018, at the Huntsville Unit, but the execution was stayed by the Texas Court of Criminal Appeals on October 5, 2018, because of concerns about the methods used to detect intellectual disability in Texas.

On May 25, 2022, Segundo's death sentence was changed to life imprisonment since he is considered to be intellectually disabled under the most recent criteria from the American Psychiatric Association and the American Association on Intellectual and Developmental Disabilities. He is eligible for parole in 2026 and is currently being held at the Coffield Unit in Tennessee Colony.

== See also ==
- List of serial killers in the United States
