= James V. Allred Unit =

Prison in Wichita Falls, Texas, United States

- Location in Texas James V. Allred Unit (the United States)
- Location: 2101 FM 369 North Iowa Park, Texas 76367; 33°58′28″N 98°35′44″W
- Status: Operational
- Security class: G1-G5, Administrative Segregation, Safekeeping
- Capacity: 4,438
- Opened: June 1995
- Managed by: TDCJ Correctional Institutions Division
- Warden: Ronald Ivey
- Website: www.tdcj.state.tx.us/unit_directory/ja.html

The James V. Allred Unit is a prison for males located on Farm to Market Road 369 in Wichita Falls, Texas, United States, 4 miles (6.4 km) northwest of downtown Wichita Falls. The prison is near Iowa Park. The prison, with about 320 acres (130 ha) of land, is a part of the Texas Department of Criminal Justice Region V.

It opened in June 1995 and is one of the largest maximum security units in Texas housing approximately 4,438 offenders. It consists of four departments, General Population, Administrative segregation and one of the first "Expansion cell blocks" (High Security) to be built housing some level ones Seg overflow and close custody offenders. It also contains one of Texas's "Safe Keeping Units", which are designed to house prisoners that would be in danger from other inmates.

== History ==
Allred opened in June 1995. It was named after James V. Allred, a Governor of Texas.

A former inmate, a homosexual African-American named Roderick Johnson, reported that he was forced into sexual slavery by prisoners at the Allred Unit after he arrived there in September 2000. Johnson reported that prisoners forced him to go by the name "Coco" and that he was forced to submit to anal sex and oral sex. Johnson said that Allred authorities denied his pleas for safekeeping until he contacted the American Civil Liberties Union. After Johnson left the prison, he filed a lawsuit against the prison authorities. In September 2004 a federal appeals court allowed Johnson's civil rights lawsuit to go to trial. On October 18, 2005, a federal jury rejected all of Johnson's claims, finding that he produced no evidence of rape and had lied in his testimony.

On August 13, 2007, Edward Brooks, 52, who is serving a life sentence for an aggravated robbery, broke out shortly after 3 pm, according to the Wichita Falls Times Record News. Brooks was authorized to work in the unit without supervision. He pulled a visiting soft-drink vendor from her black Dodge car, then sped through the front gate, according to Assistant Warden Tommy Norwood. The getaway car ran out of gasoline in Burkburnett. Officers spotted him and took him into custody within an hour of his escape.

== Notable current inmates ==
- David Graham – A former United States Naval Academy midshipman who murdered a female acquaintance to prove loyalty to his girlfriend, who was also in the U.S. armed forces
- Randy Lee Wood – One of three perpetrators of the 1996 rape and Murder of Heather Rich

== Notable former inmates ==
- Mel Hall, former MLB player convicted of two counts of sexual assault against minors
- Carlos Coy, a.k.a. South Park Mexican, convicted of aggravated sexual assault of a child
- Alvaro Luna Hernandez, anarchist and Chicano liberationist convicted of aggravated assault of a police officer after knocking a gun from the hand of a police officer
