= George Beto =

American criminal justice expert

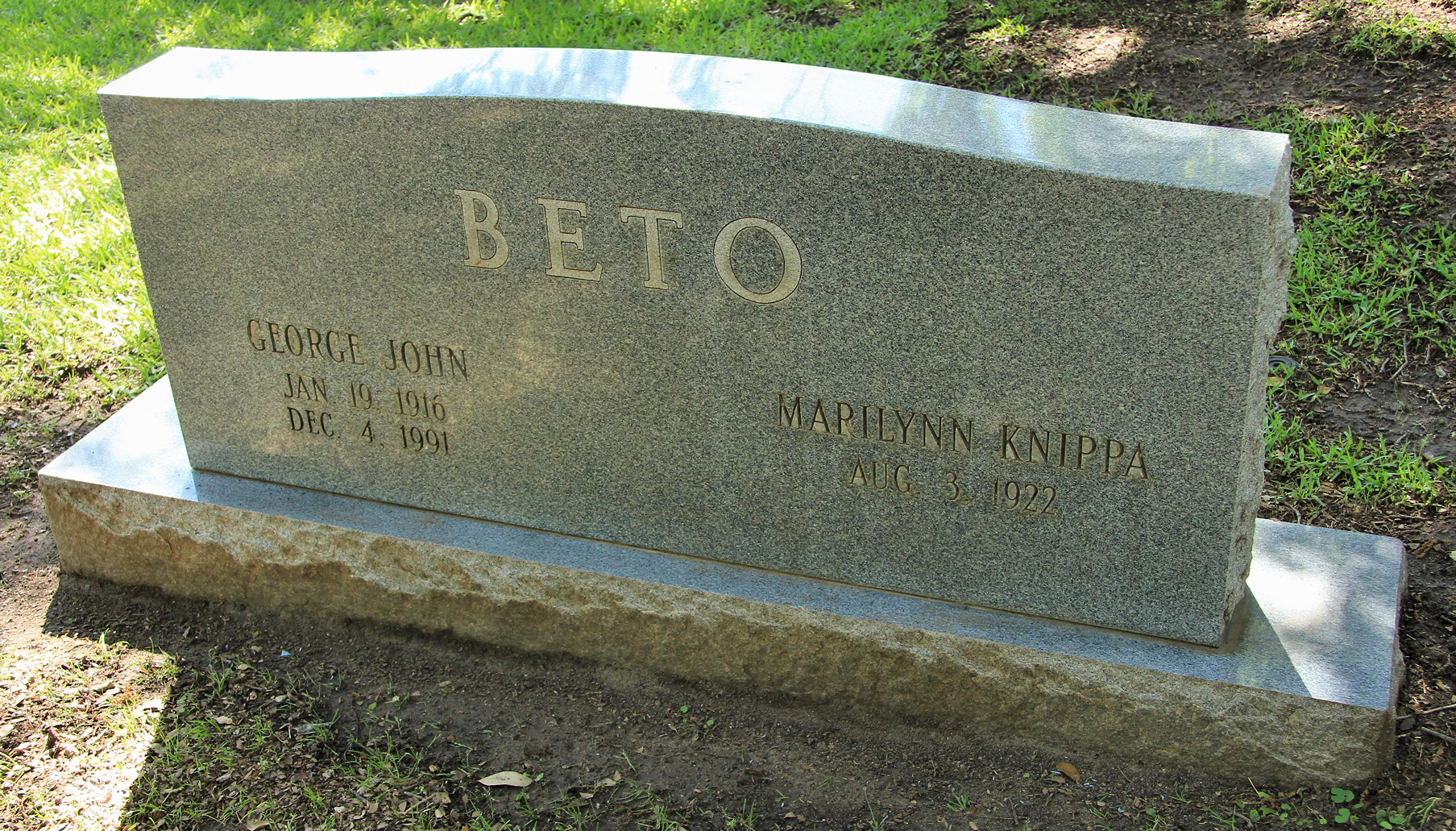
Grave of Beto at the Texas State Cemetery

George John Beto (January 19, 1916 – December 4, 1991) was a director of the Texas Department of Corrections (TDC), a criminal justice expert in penology, a professor, and a Lutheran minister. He was previously the president of Concordia Lutheran College in Austin and Concordia Theological Seminary in Springfield, Illinois.

== Early life ==
Beto was born in Hysham, Montana, on January 19, 1916. He was raised in Lena, Illinois. He enrolled in Concordia College in Milwaukee, Wisconsin, in 1930 and completed the six-year pre-seminary program in five years. He then attended Concordia Seminary in St. Louis, Missouri, from 1935 to 1937, interrupting his study for the ministry to attend Valparaiso University in Valparaiso, Indiana, where he earned a bachelor of arts degree in 1938. He then returned to Concordia Seminary to finish his studies. He received his Doctor of Divinity degree much later, in 1989.

== Texas Department of Corrections ==
Beto was appointed to the Texas Prison Board in 1953 by Allan Shivers and became director in 1961.

In his career, he greatly expanded the industry of prison-manufactured goods and oversaw the construction of new prison facilities. Beto advocated for the establishing a school district serving prisoners; in 1969, the Texas Legislature authorized the establishment of the Windham School District. During his career, Beto received awards for his management of the TDC.

=== Criticism ===
Beto was a master of publicity and was well-regarded by the media for his modernization of prisons. However, he faced accusations of cruel and unusual punishment of prisoners and denial of prisoners' access to their attorneys.

Toward the end of Beto's career as the head of TDC, attorney Frances Freeman Jalet assisted Fred Cruz and other prisoners in planning legal challenges to the TDC system. Beto banned her from the TDC units on two occasions, but court orders forced the TDC to let her back in. Beto then arranged to have three trustees sue Jalet in federal court; the lawsuit said that Jalet incited revolutionary violence and imperiled the lives of the prisoners. Beto lost the lawsuit and was ordered to pay $10,291 to Jalet and the prisoners and $27,825 for their attorney fees, with the judge commenting that "...Beto instituted reprisals against Mrs. Cruz and … her clients, for reasons unrelated to considerations of proper prison administration."

In the 1972 U.S. Supreme Court case Cruz v. Beto, the court upheld a Free Exercise discrimination claim against a Buddhist prisoner, Fred Cruz. In early 1972, Beto announced that he planned to resign from TDC but was still director on June 29, 1972, at the beginning of the lawsuit Ruiz v. Estelle.

== Later life ==
He then served as a professor of criminal justice at Sam Houston State University in Huntsville for several years. Upon retirement from that position, he moved to Austin, where he died about a year later of a heart attack. Beto is buried in the Texas State Cemetery in Austin.

=== Legacy ===
Two Texas Department of Criminal Justice prisons, the Beto Unit and the Beto II Unit (now the Louis C. Powledge Unit) in Anderson County, were named after Beto, as is the Criminal Justice Center at Sam Houston State University.
