= Murder of Heather Rich =

1996 American murder case

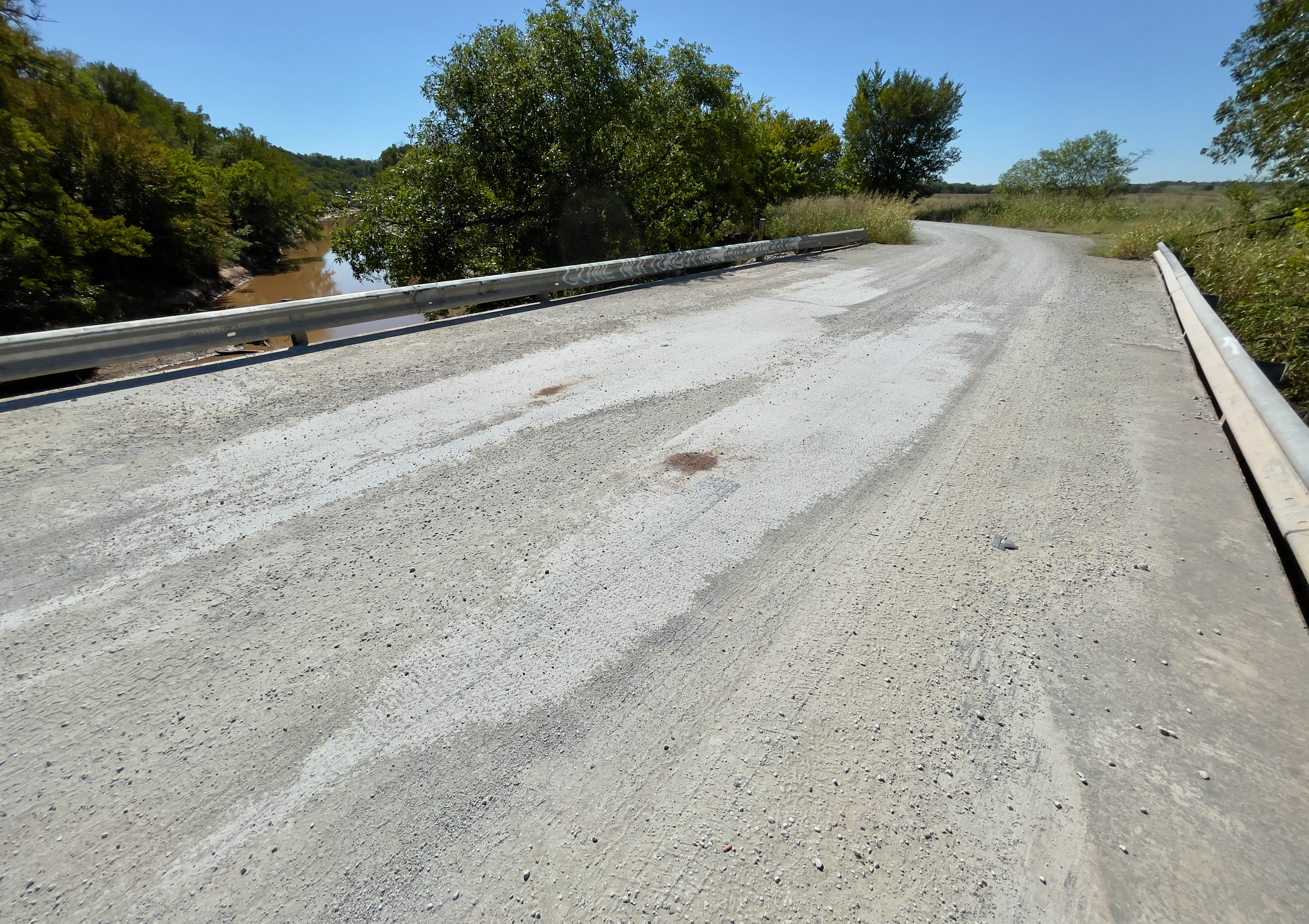
- The bridge over Belknap Creek (2022); Guardrail graffito says "GONE NOT FORGOTTEN ♥ RIP HEATHER 1996 ♥"
- Date: October 3, 1996
- Location: Bridge over Belknap Creek Montague County, Texas, US; 33.84722°N 97.84472°W
- Cause: Cranial shotgun wound
- Target: Heather Rose Rich
- Convicted: Joshua Luke Bagwell; Capital murder; Conspiracy thereto; Curtis Allen Gambill; Murder (1997); Conspiracy thereto (2002); Randy Lee Wood; Capital murder
- Sentence: Bagwell: Life + 99 years (Parolable: Nov 28, 2036); Gambill: Life × 2 (Parolable: Oct 31, 2026); Wood: Life (Parolable: Nov 20, 2036)

The murder of Heather Rich was the 1996 child murder of a Waurika, Oklahoma, 16-year-old by three local teenagers. After Rich's body was found, an investigation led to the trials and convictions of the three perpetrators.

Saddled with a recent series of negative events in her life, high-school student Heather Rich began acting out by drinking alcohol at school, using illegal drugs, and inflicting self-harm. After a family argument, Rich left home before midnight on October 2, 1996, to meet local teen Joshua Bagwell for a first date. The 17-year-old Bagwell came from a wealthy Waurikan family, and enjoyed the social status his affluence afforded him.

He was accompanied that night by Curtis Gambill, a 19-year-old high-school dropout, and 17-year-old Randy Wood. The three boys plied Rich with alcohol until she was intoxicated; then, after raping her, drove her to a Montague County, Texas, bridge, shot her nine times, and dumped her body into the creek below.

Rich's body was found and identified on October 10, and investigators from Montague County, Jefferson County, Oklahoma, the Federal Bureau of Investigation, and the Texas Ranger Division worked together to find Rich's killers. In the two weeks after the body was found, law-enforcement uncovered forensic evidence tying Bagwell and Gambill to the murder weapon. After the arrest of all three on October 24, Gambill and Wood gave differing accounts of Heather's murder, while Bagwell exercised his right to silence.

The Montague County district attorney (DA) tried Gambill first; in exchange for admission to being the triggerman, and testimony against the well-defended Bagwell, the DA did not seek capital punishment. In the successive trial against Bagwell however, Gambill reneged on his plea deal and named Wood as the shooter. Wood then forsook his own plea agreement and testified against Bagwell, exposing himself to capital punishment to avoid tainting his testimony with the appearance of favorable treatment. Bagwell was found guilty, as was Wood when his own trial came around. Imprisoned in Texas, Gambill is eligible for parole in 2026, while Bagwell and Wood have until 2036 for the same opportunity.

== Background ==
=== Heather Rich ===
Born on January 19, 1980, Heather Rose Rich was the third child of Gail and Duane Rich, who moved to Waurika, Oklahoma, in 1974. The Riches chose Waurika for its insulating nature; it reminded them of their hometown of Elgin, Oklahoma—a "place where kids couldn't get into too much trouble because there wasn't much trouble to get into." Heather Rich however, pushed back against the monotony of Waurika, a town of 1,988 in 2000.

At Waurika High School, Rich was a school cheerleader, the voted-for "sophomore-class favorite", a nominee for homecoming queen, and an honors student. Away from school, Rich and other Waurika youths would commonly spend their evenings and nights cruising Main Street, drinking alcohol, building bonfires, and smoking—cigarettes, cannabis, and/or methamphetamine. One of Rich's close friends would later describe her as "very troubled" beneath her façade of ebullience, and Rich's mother would later lament not having the time to vet her daughter's friends.

Rich was known to "[enjoy] the attention of boys"; her mother would later quote her daughter, who liked to say, "If you’ve got it, flaunt it." Gail Rich opined that Heather was unaware of her effects on men, having seen adults in their forties flirt with the teenager. Rich's parents curtailed her dating prerogative, prompting the teen to complain about allegedly being the only virgin at her school. The summer before her eighth grade, Rich began purging because "boys liked her figure, and she was determined to stay a size 2."

At home, Rich became "moody and withdrawn", and began cutting herself. When her father was almost killed on the job, her mother began working long hours to make up for the lost family income. As a result, the responsibility of caring for her father and accomplishing household chores largely fell to Rich. A few weeks into the 1996–1997 academic year, Rich's boyfriend, eventual perpetrator Randy Wood, ended their relationship due to the rumor of Rich skinny-dipping at a co-ed party; Pamela Colloff with Texas Monthly described this dissolution as having "deeply rattled" Rich. Soon thereafter, Rich began using methamphetamine. Then, less than a week after her breakup, an acquaintance of Rich, Wood, Bagwell, and Gambill—twenty-year-old Dennis Wayne Goss—committed suicide by gun. Rich's mother described her daughter during this time as having "a brightness, a glitteryness, about her eyes". At the Friday, September 27 football game, Rich led school cheers while drunk, and received a three-day school suspension and consideration for being dropped from the school cheerleading program. Concerned for their daughter, Rich's parents scheduled her for an October 3 therapy appointment, later saying, "We wanted to get her help and figure out why she wanted to hurt herself."

=== Perpetrators ===
==== Josh Bagwell ====
At the time of Rich's murder, Joshua Luke Bagwell lived with his wealthy grandparents in Waurika. The recipient of six new cars, Bagwell was variously described as "a snob" and pampered. Undisciplined at home, the teen was unreceptive to any discipline outside his home: once arrested for driving under the influence, Bagwell demanded his lawyer and resisted arrest. Both Wood and Rich were impressed by Bagwell's means, the latter such that she flirted with him until securing a spot in his white Dodge Stealth for the Waurika homecoming parade. In October 1996, Bagwell was a senior at Waurika High. In early 2002, he was described as blonde, 5 feet 8 inches (1.73 m) tall, and weighing 160 pounds (73 kg).

==== Curtis Gambill ====
At the time of Rich's murder, Curtis Allen Gambill, a high-school-dropout, was living with his 64-year-old grandmother Reda Robbins in Terral, Oklahoma—20 miles (32 km) downriver from Waurika. The great-grandson of Kate Rich (murdered locally in 1982 by Henry Lee Lucas), Gambill was described as having "a mean streak […] He was always raising Cain, and everyone knew to steer clear of him." In 2002, Gambill was described by law-enforcement as "the most violent person I've ever known, […] When you're around him, you literally feel like you're in the presence of evil." At school, Gambill forced other boys to fight each other; in the community, it was believed that he killed livestock "for sport". Gambill escaped every youth detention center in which he was incarcerated, was briefly committed to a psychiatric hospital at seventeen, and was convicted of "feloniously carrying a firearm" on February 13, 1996 (receiving a five-year suspended sentence). In early 2002, he was described as blonde, 5 feet 8 inches (1.73 m) tall, and weighing 160 pounds (73 kg).

Gambill was friends with Bagwell through their shared interests in guns, camping, fishing, and "hanging out along the river"; Gambill and Wood were acquaintances having spent one summer working in watermelon fields. In the lead-up to Rich's disappearance, Gambill was described by his grandmother as "brooding" over the suicide of his best friend, Dennis Wayne Goss. Robbins later said that Gambill "had made some strange remarks to her about his late friend: Dennis Wayne hadn't killed himself; he had been murdered, and Curtis intended to find out who did it." When Robbins told Gambill about the recovery of Rich's body, Gambill said, "Grandma, I don't give a f— [sic] about that little girl."

==== Randy Wood ====
Randy Lee Wood and his mother spent his childhood relocating throughout Oklahoma; in his fifth-grade year, Wood attended three different schools. In 1996, Wood lived with his single-parent mother as one of the poorest families in Waurika; their poverty was evident to other Waurikans as their frame house was dotted with broken windows. Wood began smoking cannabis in the third grade, stealing the psychotropic from his mother. Despite these disadvantages, Wood endeavored to better. In the community, other Waurikans liked him as the "soft-spoken, well-mannered teenager" who wore Oxford shirts and khakis, and walked the one mile (1.6 km) to school. There, he was respected by his players as captain of the Waurika High football team.

In 1996, Wood was regarded as a "big, dumb kid", "a little slow", and adored around town. Rich's mother opined that it was Wood's "underdog" status that drew her teenager to the other. Rich and Wood were a couple for five months, during which time they attended church and would simply "talk for hours on end". Wood would drive Rich around in his grandmother's Cadillac Fleetwood, once allowing Rich to take the wheel while taking her to an orthodontics appointment in Duncan, Oklahoma. Though in an intimate relationship, the two never had sexual intercourse and were frequently mistaken as just friends. Wood resented Rich flirting with others, and later admitted that "I knew her but not like I wanted to, […] not like I should have." The night after Rich's body was found, Wood was crowned homecoming king by Waurika High School. Prior to his involvement in the killing of Heather Rich, Wood had no history of trouble with the law.

== Disappearance and discovery ==
On October 2, over an unaffordable US$300 (equivalent to $615.85 in 2025) long-distance phone bill, Rich's mother snapped at the teen, declaring "All you ever do is cost me money". Rich later wished her father good-night, ignoring her mother. Then, before midnight, Rich discreetly left via her bedroom window to meet Josh Bagwell for their first date.

The morning of October 3, the Jefferson County Sheriff's Department wouldn't accept a missing-person report, telling Rich's parents that she had probably only run away temporarily. Gail Rich did not accept that theory because her daughter's possessions were left behind. Instead, the mother-of-four canvassed Waurika, making inquiries about her daughter's whereabouts. That same day, she was given the Waurika High School list of absentees; Randy Wood and Joshua Bagwell were both listed. When Rich reached out to Wood about Heather, he replied flatly that he had not seen her, saying he had been "with Josh Bagwell all night, till six this morning." Absent due to a three-day suspension, when questioned by Rich's family, Bagwell shrugged and said he had not seen her for a week. In the following days, Gail and Duane Rich both hired a private investigator and made use of bloodhounds to search the woodlands around Waurika.

The evening of October 9, 1996, a Texas rancher and his granddaughter came across Rich's body floating in Belknap Creek, a Texas-side, backwater stream of the Red River of the South. Without his glasses, the rancher assumed they had come across a drowned calf from upstream, so he shot the body twice with his .22-caliber rifle to sink it. He realized his mistake the next morning when Rich's body was still afloat in the creek. Law-enforcement determined she was thrown from a nearby concrete bridge, where dirt had been used to obscure her blood. Rich's face was unrecognizable due to the gunshot wound to the back of her head; she was identified within a few hours only by her gold-and-diamond signet ring—a gift for her sixteenth birthday. The teenager had been shot nine times (once to the head, eight times to the back) with a shotgun; her body was so disfigured that her family was not allowed to see it, and photos of the autopsy "would later make jurors recoil."

=== Funeral ===
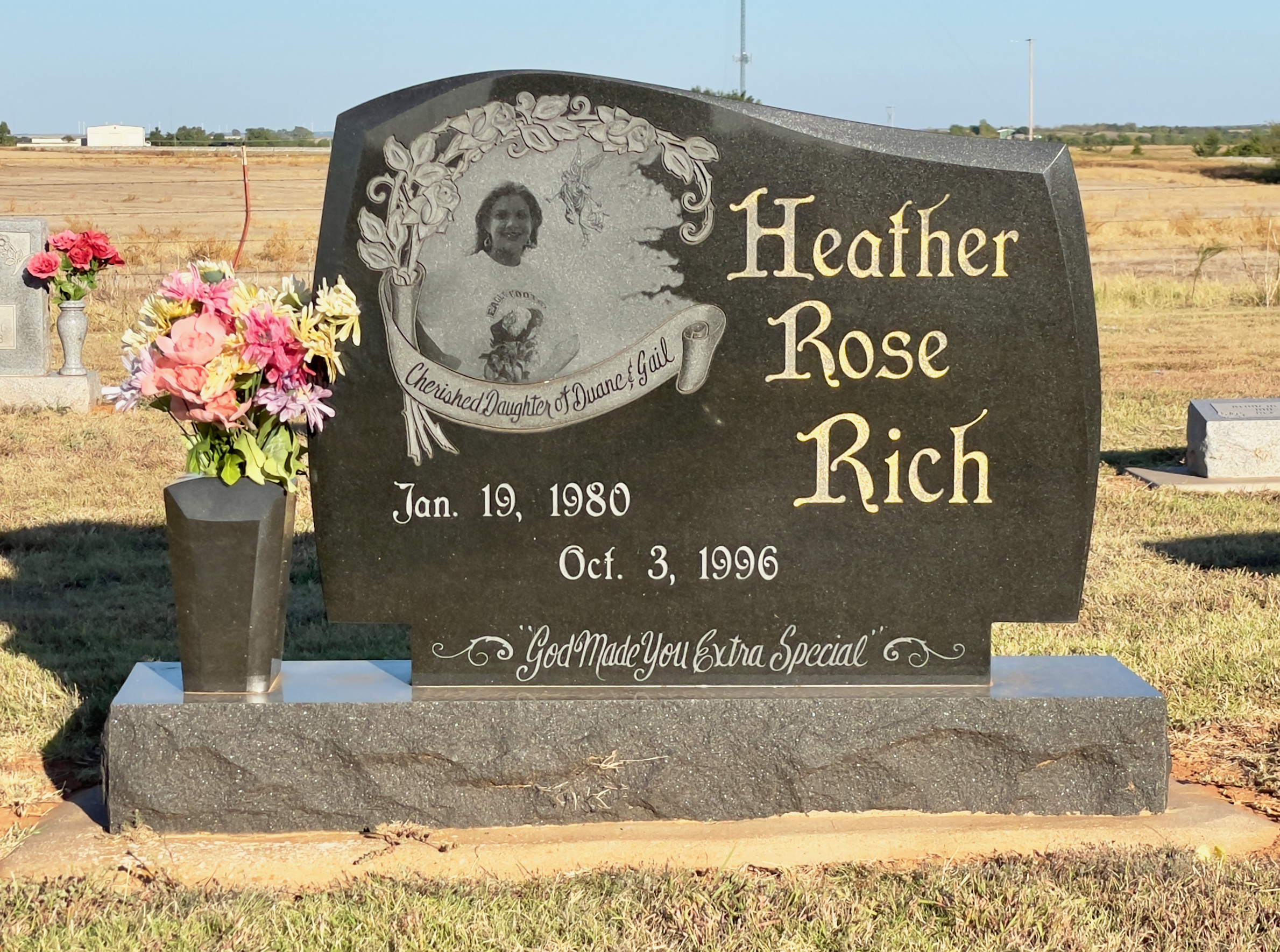
Rich's headstone in Fletcher, Oklahoma

Rich's funeral was on October 14 at the Praise Assembly of God Church in Comanche, Oklahoma. Because Rich's family suspected the perpetrator was not a stranger, nobody was allowed to touch her casket so that, as her mother promised, "whoever did this to her would never touch her again". Heather Rich was buried in Fletcher, Oklahoma.

== Investigation ==
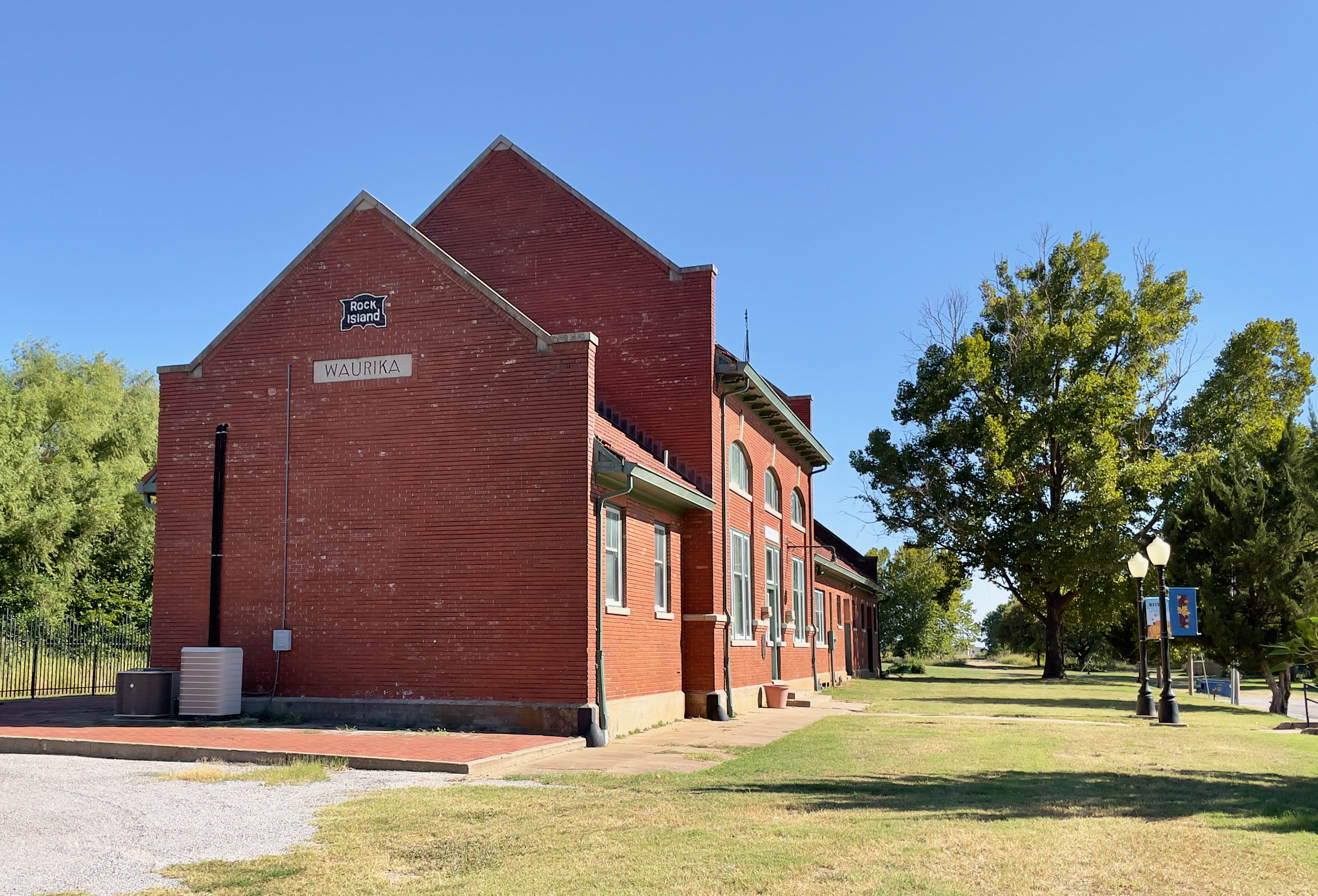
The investigation's ad hoc headquarters was in the Rock Island Depot in Waurika (pictured 2022).

Investigators from Montague County, Texas were joined by those from Jefferson County, Oklahoma, the Federal Bureau of Investigation, and the Texas Ranger Division; Sheriff Chris Hamilton from Montague County was one of twenty state- and federal-level investigators working from the Waurika train depot to solve Rich's murder. These investigators interviewed over 100 people in the days after Rich's body was found, but had made little progress after a week. Of local teenagers' refusal to speak with police and investigators, Sheriff Hamilton noted that, "[t]here was a party culture up there, and kids didn’t want to snitch. There was a code of honor, an us-against-the-police kind of attitude." Many tips concerned the Waurika drug culture, and one credible lead said that Rich snuck away from home to attend a party at the home of Josh Bagwell, though Bagwell, Wood, and Gambill all denied seeing her there.

After the investigation took a wrong turn towards a methamphetamine dealer whose alibi proved truthful, Lane Akin with the Texas Ranger Division focused on the lead claiming that Rich left home on the night of October 2 to attend Josh Bagwell's party. Though the three boys claimed they had not seen Rich while playing dominoes and drinking whisky all night at Josh's, Akin believed that Wood's then-current behavior was indicative of something more, or something else: the Waurika High homecoming king was intoxicated most of the time, and in a newspaper interview, gave cryptic responses that fueled Akin's suspicions.

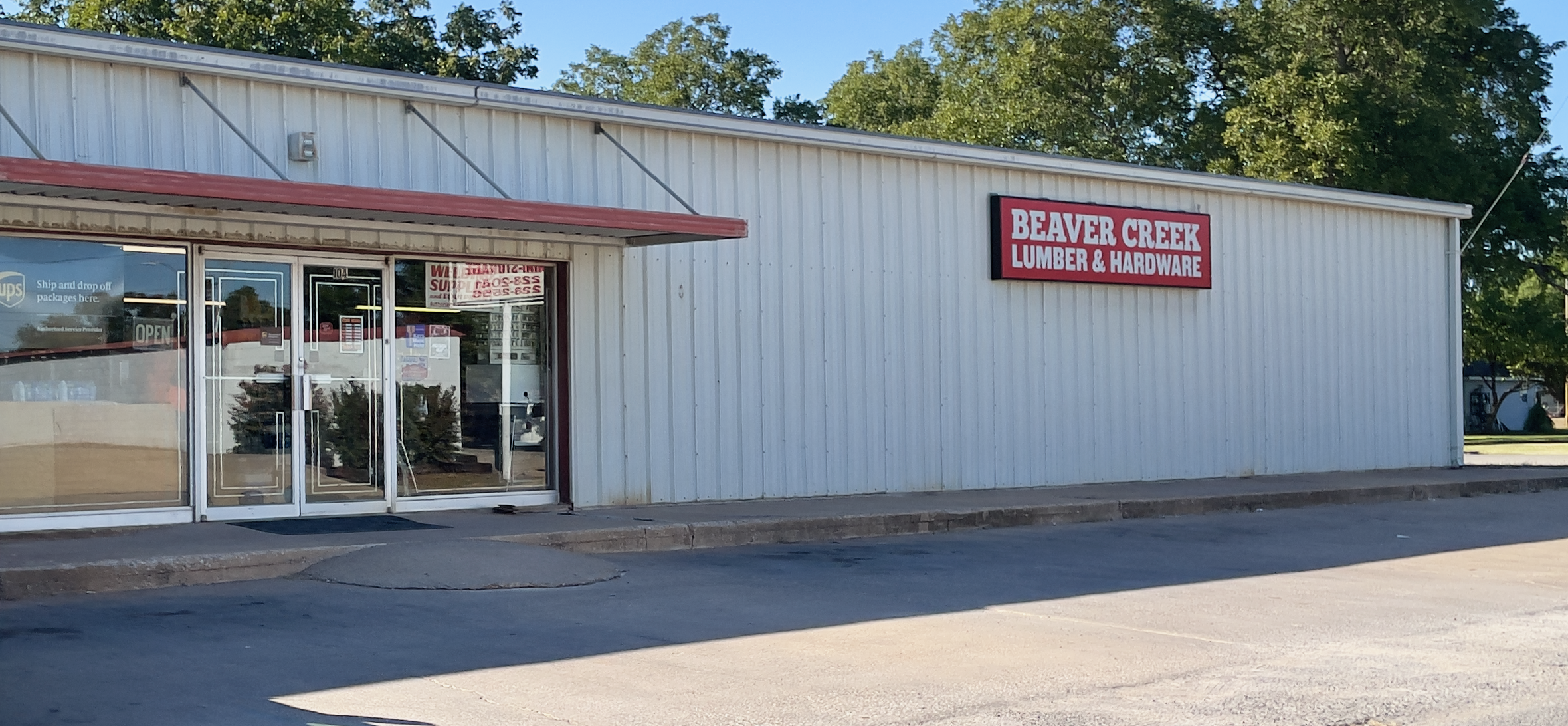
The hardware store (pictured 2022) from which Bagwell bought the buckshot

Forensic tests determined that the buckshot and wadding in Rich's body was "consistent with 00 Winchester ammunition, and that the likely murder weapon was an Mossberg M-9 shotgun." Investigators also learned that, with permission from Bagwell's mother on October 1, Carolyn Beaver sold Bagwell and Gambill four boxes of the same ammunition from Beaver Hardware in Waurika, and that Gambill owned a Mossberg M-9. Paul Smith was an investigator with the Montague County district attorney's office, and having previously investigated Gambill's great-grandmother's murder, Smith intuited that he and Akin should interview Reda Robbins, who had previously been uncooperative with investigators. Set at ease by Smith, Robbins told the men about "Old Blackie", Gambill's O.F. Mossberg & Sons 12-gauge shotgun, a firearm that would later be identified as the murder weapon.

=== Interrogations ===
Bagwell, Gambill, and Wood were arrested in the late hours of October 24, 1996, and formally charged with first-degree murder in Montague County, Texas, on October 25.

==== Bagwell's arrest ====
Akin served the arrest warrant on Bagwell, finding the teen at home amongst two swords, two assault rifles (one a bayoneted SKS), and a book on bombmaking. When the Ranger suggested Rich's murder had caused the teen insomnia, Bagwell replied that, "You just woke me up, […] Did it look like I was having trouble sleeping?" Of the three murder suspects, only Josh Bagwell exercised his right to silence and provided no statement to police, nor did he submit himself to a polygraph. Before being tried for Rich's murder, Bagwell bragged to friends "that there wasn’t enough evidence to try him."

==== Gambill's version of events ====
When questioned on October 24 about the shotgun and ammunition, Gambill said they were for hunting, and that he could prove so. However, after leading the Federal Bureau of Investigation on a wild-goose chase through pastures looking for spent hulls, Gambill conceded the possibility that he was involved in Rich's murder.

When Curtis Gambill was questioned, Ranger Akin would later say that the teen "was extremely cooperative and seemed to be enjoying the attention." Gambill professed he didn't previously know Rich; he told Akin that she had snuck out of her house for her date with Josh Bagwell. Bagwell plied Rich with alcohol until she was intoxicated, and the two had sex "for a couple of hours". Gambill said that after Rich began drunkenly flirting with Wood and himself, they were going to "get a piece, but she passed out." According to Gambill, after Rich momentarily regained consciousness, began crying and screaming, and then passed out again, it was Bagwell and Wood who began to panic about having just committed rape and attempted rape (respectively). Wood allegedly carried the unconscious Rich to Bagwell's pickup truck, shot her after arriving at the Belknap Creek bridge, and then instigated the disposal of her body into the Belknap Creek saying, "Throw her ass over." Gambill described Wood's motive as sexual jealousy after Rich had sex with Bagwell.

Akin believed most of what Gambill claimed, while suspecting the teen himself was the one to shoot Heather; the Montague County, Texas, district attorney on the other hand "never gave any credence to Curtis's account". Both men cited Wood's clean record, Gambill's ownership of the murder weapon, and the Montague-County crime scene's location being known only to Gambill. When polygraph-tested on his statement, Gambill failed.

==== Wood's version of events ====
Wood was interrogated after Gambill implicated him as the shooter.

Much of Wood's statement to Sheriff Hamilton matched what Gambill said. Wood added that Gambill raped Rich while she was incapacitated, but claimed that though he was partially undressed at the time, Wood himself did not. Wood also admitted to dressing the unconscious Rich. Picking up the story at the bridge, Wood claimed that after Rich was sat upon the roadway, he climbed back into the truck and covered his face with his hands. Bagwell and Gambill were still outside the truck when Wood heard the gunshots; "After the shots stopped, I looked up and Curtis had the shotgun." Upon further questioning, Wood conceded that he had digitally penetrated the unconscious Rich—an act of rape. Wood's description of events passed the polygraph.

== Trials ==
=== Gambill ===
Represented by Wichita Falls, Texas, attorney Bruce Martin, Gambill's trial began on October 2, 1997, in Fort Worth, Texas, after a 67-mile (108 km) change of venue from Montague County, Texas. The first to be tried for the murder of Heather Rich, Gambill benefited from the courtroom tactics of the Montague County district attorney, Tim Cole. Seeing Gambill's conviction as a surer gamble than Bagwell's, and with the approval of Rich's family, Cole offered to eschew capital punishment for Gambill in exchange for a guilty plea and testimony against Josh Bagwell. The deal was struck, and Gambill pleaded guilty to murder. During the trial, Gambill had to be restrained by nine men when the teen overpowered a court bailiff. According to the Texas Department of Criminal Justice, Gambill was convicted on October 15, 1997, sentenced to life imprisonment, and will become eligible for parole on October 31, 2026.

In January 2002, Curtis Gambill and Josh Bagwell were transferred from state prison to the Montague County jail so that Gambill could be tried for conspiracy to commit murder. On January 16, Gambill was convicted and sentenced to a second, cumulative, life imprisonment.

=== Bagwell ===
While remanded, Joshua Bagwell received white-supremacy prison tattoos, attempted escape, attempted to instigate a prison riot, threatened to murder prison officers, and attacked a police officer.

Texas v. Bagwell
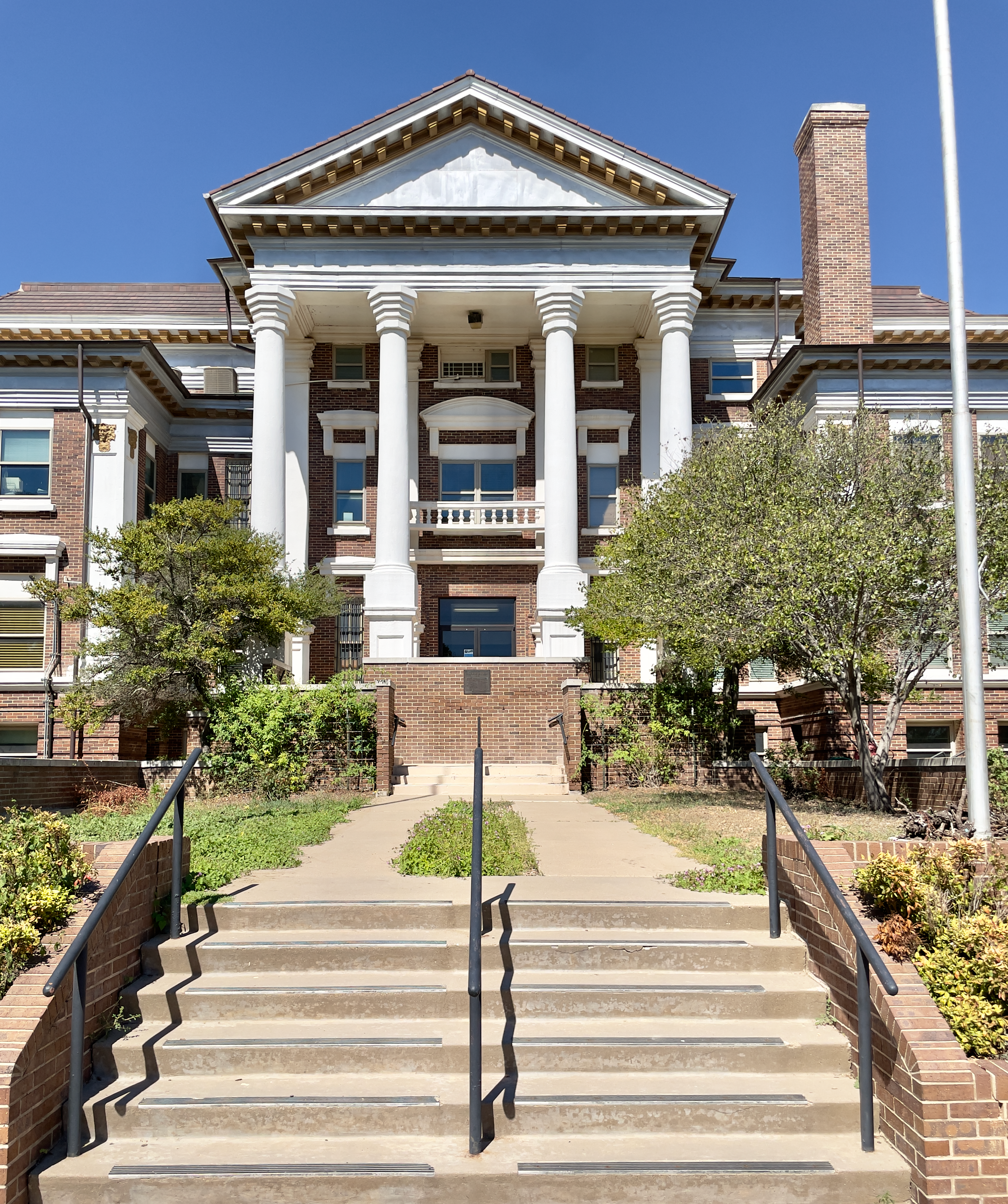
- Montague County, Texas courthouse (2022)
- Full case name: The State of Texas v. Joshua Luke Bagwell
- Decided: February 17, 1998

Case history
- Appealed to: 2nd Court of Appeals of TX; US District Court N.D. Tex.

Bagwell's family wealth afforded him expensive, private criminal defense lawyers for his trial: Oklahoman attorneys John Zelbst and Barry Cousins, and a former Montague County district attorney, Jack McGaughey. A change of venue having been denied by District Judge Roger Towery, jury selection began on February 3, 1998, in the county courthouse in Montague, Texas (population 300). Bagwell's attorneys took the tack of highlighting Rich's own apparent failings so as to paint the picture that Bagwell 'couldn't rape the willing'. A one-time publisher of the Waurika News-Democrat described the defense as "[making] her look like the Whore of Babylon"; Gail Rich herself was cross-examined, requiring her to acknowledge her daughter's smoking, bulimia, and recreational cannabis use, summing it up by asking Mrs. Rich, "She was your perfect child, but she wasn't quite perfect, right?"

District Attorney Cole was already worried about the Bagwell trial when both Gambill and Wood reneged on their plea bargains. However, while Gambill was returning to his original claims of Wood being Rich's murderer, Wood was forfeiting only the benefits of his plea deal so as to make assurances that his testimony against Bagwell would not be seen as reciprocation. On February 10, 1998, against counsel's recommendation, Wood incriminated himself, setting aside a guaranteed 40-year imprisonment (with the possibility of parole after 30) in exchange for the possibility of capital punishment, all to strengthen his testimony against Bagwell; Wood said, "I wanted everyone to know I was telling the truth, […] I owed that to Heather and her family." Testifying for the prosecution, Wood said that not only was Bagwell fully aware of the plan to murder Rich, he also carried her to the bridge, weighed down her body, and helped toss it into the creek.

Zelbst's cross-examination was described as relentless in his attempts to portray Wood as "a lying, scheming, drug-abusing, jealous killer who was angry at Heather [Rich] for having sex with his drinking buddies, then rejecting him by screaming in her sleep when he fondled her." Zelbst succeeded in having Wood acknowledge that Bagwell did not explicitly agree to kill Rich, nor did he carry Rich that night. DA Cole conducted redirect examination on Wood, and brought out "the legally-significant facts" of Bagwell's awareness of Gambill's intent to kill, and Bagwell's assistance in disposing of the body and obscuring Rich's blood on the bridge.

The final witness for February 10 was a military policeman who guarded Gambill during the teen's 1992 tenure in an Oklahoman youth detention center. In the prosecution's effort to refute Bagwell's claim that Wood was the shooter, testimony was heard that during his time so incarcerated, Gambill allegedly claimed "that his 'ultimate fantasy' was to commit a crime that would shock the nation. His fantasy, the witness said, was to kidnap and rape a beautiful young girl, then 'blow her head off.'"

Bagwell climbed the witness stand on February 11. Described as seemingly reading from a script, Bagwell refuted Wood's testimony. According to Bagwell, it was Wood who unexpectedly killed Rich, yet while Bagwell was recalling the early hours of October 3, 1996, in the first-person present-tense, a speech error (his only) slipped in: "I see Curtis—or, I mean, excuse me—I see Randy lowering the gun."

After more than seven hours of jury deliberation on February 17, 1998, Bagwell was found guilty of capital murder and conspiracy to commit capital murder. Capital murder earned Bagwell an automatic sentence of life imprisonment; for the conspiracy charge, his jury deliberated for three hours before recommending a concurrent 99-year sentence because of the crime's brutality. A fine of $10,000 (equivalent to $19,753 in 2025) was also imposed with the conspiracy conviction. Bagwell's mother believed Wood had received a "secret deal", furiously accused DA Cole of prosecutorial misconduct, and blamed the jury for "not following the judge's instructions." Zelbst said he would appeal the jury's decision and request a new trial.

On November 22, 2000, an appeal was filed with the Second Court of Appeals of Texas on behalf of Joshua Luke Bagwell. The appeal (a petition for writ of habeas corpus) argued that because Heather Rich was unconscious when taken to Belknap Creek, she could not move, and if unable to move, she therefore had no movements to restrain, and restraint of the victim is an integral component of kidnapping. Therefore, because the Texas Penal Code defines capital murder as "a level of murder that requires a kidnapping component", Bagwell could not be guilty of the level of murder for which he was convicted. The appeal blamed Bagwell's 1998 lawyers for failing to demonstrate this incongruity before the court, and therefore the imprisonment was a rights violation. The appeal was rejected on January 31, 2001.

On April 14, 2006, Bagwell's lawyers elevated their appeal to the United States District Court for the Northern District of Texas. The following day, a United States magistrate judge acknowledged that though Bagwell was a "cretin", the petition had merit and would be considered by the federal court. In an interview with the Duncan Banner, and in his assurances to Montague County residents, the county district attorney said that "no matter what happens next, Mr. Bagwell is not going to be getting out of prison". To bolster his statement, the DA explained that he had never filed Bagwell's indictment for escaping custody in 2002, "which could be done if necessary".

=== Wood ===
Texas v. Wood
- Full case name: The State of Texas v. Randy Lee Wood
- Decided: August 25, 1998

Case history
- Appealed to: 2nd Court of Appeals of TX

As reported in The Victoria Advocate, Wood's original trial was scheduled to begin in May 1998, but because his trial drew significant national media attention, it was postponed until that autumn. Among the media to descend upon Waurika, Oklahoma, and nearby Montague, Texas were numerous television personalities and interviewers, Mike Cochran with the Associated Press, and ABC's Primetime Live. Bagwell's mother joined her son at his jail for a televised interview—now alleging that her 19-year-old was the victim of a frameup; Randy Wood reiterated his previous testimony on national television; and Gail Rich forewent paid interview offers after "Primetime Live […] producers convinced her they would not sensationalize the story."

Wood declined another plea deal, refusing to say that he had murdered Rich. District Attorney Cole prosecuted Wood for, and secured a conviction of, capital murder. Found guilty on August 25, 1998, Wood was automatically sentenced to life imprisonment on August 27; he will become eligible for parole on November 20, 2036. Wood intended to appeal his conviction, telling the Times Record News that "You can look it up in the dictionary, and 'murder' says to take someone's life, and I didn't do that". Cole and Rich's mother both regret that Wood received such a long sentence, describing him as "the teenager who, late in the game, found the strength of character to own up to his crime and paid for it dearly."

Wood filed an appeal with the Second Court of Appeals of Texas (Randy Lee WOOD, Appellant, v. The STATE of Texas, State), contending that his trial attorney was ineffective, both failing to "request an instruction on the lesser-included offense of murder", and failing to notice that "the trial court's application paragraph at the guilt-innocence phase of trial was erroneous". On October 14, 1999, the state overruled each of Wood's points and re-affirmed the trial's conclusion.

== Aftermath ==
The Texas prisons in which Bagwell, Gambill, and Wood are incarcerated

As of January 14, 2023, all three murderers were incarcerated in Texas: Joshua Luke Bagwell was imprisoned at the Coffield Unit in Tennessee Colony, and will become eligible for parole on November 28, 2036 (10 years' time); Curtis Allen Gambill was at the Wynne Unit in Huntsville, eligible for parole on October 31, 2026 (3 months' time); and Randy Lee Wood was at the James V. Allred Unit in Iowa Park, parole-eligible on November 20, 2036 (10 years' time).

=== Wrongful death suit ===
In 1998, Rich's father filed a wrongful death lawsuit against Carolyn Beaver and the hardware store, alleging that she "negligently delivered and/or sold the ammunition to Bagwell and/or Gambill and that Beaver's negligence was the proximate cause of Heather Rich's death." The United States District Court for the Western District of Oklahoma denied Rich's motion for partial summary judgment on May 13, 1999, saying that Okla. Stat. tit. 21, § 1272 did not define the shotgun ammunition as an offensive weapon, and that Beaver therefore did not violate § 1273 by selling it to Bagwell. Eight days later, the same court granted Beaver's motion for summary judgment, finding that "there was no evidence that Beaver should have foreseen that Bagwell and Gambill would use the ammunition to murder Heather Rich and that the criminal act of murder was the supervening cause of Heather Rich's death."

Rich appealed to the United States Court of Appeals for the Tenth Circuit, which concurred with the district court, affirming the lower court's summary judgment on May 3, 2000.

=== Escape ===
After already failing to escape jail once, Gambill told Cynthia McFadden in a 1998 interview that he would continue to try until he escaped: "Yes, this is nothing … because I'm mentally strong, know what I'm saying? […] Can't keep me here forever."

In the late hours of January 28, 2002, Josh Bagwell, Curtis Gambill, and two other inmates (Charles Wilson Jordan and Chrystal Gale Soto) overpowered two jailers and escaped the uncertified Montague County, Texas jail in one jailer's 2001 Geo Chevrolet Tracker. The four killers eluded hundreds of Texan, Oklahoman, and federal law-enforcement officers for nine days before being caught at an Ardmore, Oklahoma, filling station on February 7. Jordan and Soto were captured outside the store without incident. Bagwell and Gambill held officers at bay for six hours by holding the 70-year-old owner hostage with a stolen .22-caliber firearm. Both surrendered at 4:30 a.m. after negotiating with Federal Bureau of Investigation agents. After their capture, both men were held in the Carter County, Oklahoma, jail. On August 15, Carter County prosecutors dismissed the charges against Bagwell and Gambill ("kidnapping, conspiracy to commit first-degree robbery, felonious possession of a firearm, unauthorized use of a motor vehicle and being a fugitive from justice") without prejudice, citing the complicated process of extradition to Oklahoma for trial.

In February 2002, Bagwell's mother (Twana "Cherese" Smith) sought out Curtis Gambill's brother (Rick Gambill) to assist her in helping the two felons escape again. After the former Lawton, Oklahoma city attorney asked Rick Gambill for "firearms, cell phones and maps to help the two felons after their planned escape" from the Carter County jail, Rick Gambill went to and cooperated with the police to collect evidence. Police stymied Smith's attempt—in her capacity as Bagwell's attorney—to smuggle hacksaw blades, hidden inside two bibles, to Bagwell and Gambill. While still under police surveillance, Smith left the jail, bought more blades at a Wal-Mart, wrapped them in a balloon, and successfully snuck them past prison officers who believe she hid them inside "a body cavity". Smith was arrested in Terral, Oklahoma, on February 27, 2002, and on February 28, she was charged with "conspiring to commit a felony and use of a firearm during the commission of a felony"; bail was set at $200,000 (equivalent to $358,002 in 2025). On August 16, Smith plead guilty to conspiracy to assist in an escape and conspiracy to commit a felony with a firearm; she was sentenced to 20 years in prison, with twelve deferred.

=== Goss investigation ===
A week before Rich's murder, Goss—a good friend of Gambill's—died from apparent suicide by gun. In the early 2000s, the Jefferson County, Oklahoma then-sheriff, Stan Barnes, reopened the Goss case. Barnes' reasons included a mismatch of the found shell casing and wadding, as well as Goss having told his father in 1996 that "he feared for his life." Barnes and much of Waurika, Oklahoma, believed that there was a connection between the two deaths, and that Rich may have been a witness. The Oklahoma Office of the Chief Medical Examiner later changed Goss' official cause of death from suicide to "unknown".

=== Reconsideration for Wood ===
Denise Horner, a cousin of Randy Wood, began a campaign in the late 2000s for a commutation of his sentence. As of March 2014, then-Texas Governor Rick Perry had only commuted one capital murder sentence in his over-thirteen years in office. Furthermore, before any commutation request could even be sent to Austin for consideration, two of three current elected officials in Montague County, Texas ("the sitting DA, the district judge, and the sheriff") would need to approve the effort, as would the Texas Board of Pardons and Paroles.

Regretful that he had not instead tried Wood for the lesser charge of conspiracy to commit capital murder in 1998, Tim Cole agreed to help Horner. An acquaintance of the new Montague County district attorney, Jack McGaughey, when Cole approached the man in 2010, he was reluctant to consider the proposal. McGaughey expressed the same feelings to Horner in 2011, and followed up with her lawyer, writing, "I am unwilling to recommend this, […] After consultation with the Sheriff and District Judge, it is my understanding from them that they are also unwilling to recommend a reduction of sentence."

In October 2016, Wood married Larissa Huia, an Auckland woman who first saw Wood on a television documentary in 2014. "Horrified" by Wood's lengthy sentence, Huia was driven to "write to him and tell him there's one person in the world that doesn't think he's a bad person." By August 2018, Wood's wife was lobbying to overturn state laws that allowed minors to be tried as an adult. She told Stuff, "Although my motivation is Randy [Wood], this is not about one person. This is about as many as 1700 inmates in Texas who were incarcerated as juveniles to prison terms NZ would never see, even for adults."

== See also ==
- Capital punishment in Texas
- Crime in Oklahoma
- Crime in Texas
- List of murdered American children
- List of punishments for murder in the United States
- List of solved missing person cases: 1950–1999
