= Billy Chemirmir =

Kenyan-American convicted murderer (1972–2023)

- Chemirmir's mugshot
- Born: Billy Kipkorir Chemirmir; December 8, 1972; Eldama Ravine, Rift Valley Province, Kenya
- Died: September 19, 2023 (aged 50); Tennessee Colony, Texas, U.S.
- Cause of death: Blunt force trauma
- Status: Deceased
- Motive: Robbery
- Conviction: Capital murder (×2)
- Penalty: Life imprisonment

Details
- Victims: 2 confirmed, 22–24+ suspected
- Span of crimes: May 2016 – March 2018
- Country: United States
- State: Texas
- Date apprehended: March 20, 2018
- Imprisoned at: Coffield Unit

Billy Kipkorir Chemirmir (December 8, 1972 – September 19, 2023) was a Kenyan murderer and suspected serial killer accused of the murders of at least 18 elderly women in Dallas, Texas, United States, and its surrounding suburbs. Chemirmir was indicted for 22 murders and convicted of two. Civil suits were also filed accusing him of two other similar murders. In September 2023, Chemirmir was killed in prison.

== Biography ==
Billy Kipkorir Chemirmir was born in Kabonyony village, a suburb of Eldama Ravine, as one of 29 children. His father, Joel Chemirmir, was a long-serving Lembus chief and prosperous farmer, and his mother was the second of Joel's three wives. Chemirmir was raised in Solai and returned to his hometown after finishing high school in Nakuru to live with his maternal grandmother. He was described as an introverted loner, but also remembered for his generosity to fellow villagers. Due to problems with alcoholism, his sisters arranged for him and two brothers to emigrate to the United States in 2003. He was trained as a caregiver at a senior living agency co-owned by his family in North Texas and received permanent residency status with a green card.

Chemirmir cut ties with his family a few years after his immigration, claiming he wanted to freelance as an in-home caregiver, supplementing his income by working as a car salesman. In 2004, he married a woman in Denton County, but the couple divorced in October 2006, as his then-wife complained that Chemirmir left her and could not be found through his family or employers.

=== Prior criminal record ===
Chemirmir had convictions for driving under the influence in Addison and Dallas in 2010 and 2011, receiving fines and short custodial sentences. In July 2012, Chemirmir was arrested for assault on a female companion. He had repeatedly kicked and punched her as well as beaten her with a pot and later stabbed a knife into a chair. He received a 70-day jail sentence after pleading no contest. In 2016, Chemirmir was twice caught trespassing at Edgemere Retirement Community, both times giving the name Benjamin Koitaba. During the second arrest in July 2016, he provided identification for both his real name and the Koitaba alias. Chemirmir again pled no contest and received a 70-day sentence, being released after serving 12 days for good behavior. Police later considered three deaths at the facility as possibly linked to Chemirmir.

== Murders ==
Chemirmir was accused of posing as a medical professional or maintenance person and gaining access to the properties of at least twenty-one elderly people. Police in several North Texas communities have investigated Chemirmir for additional victims, believing that a number of previously reported natural deaths may be linked to him. Investigators stated that Chemirmir was believed to have been motivated by robbery and that he stole some of the victims' jewelry, which he then sold online.

=== Arrest ===
On March 19, 2018, 91-year-old Mary Annis Bartel (née Crawford), a resident of Preston Place Retirement Community in Plano, Texas, told police that Chemirmir had attempted to smother her with a pillow the day before, telling her "Go to the bed. Don't fight me". Bartel lost consciousness during the attack and after her assailant left the apartment, a neighbor found her and alerted the authorities. Through Bartel's description, Chemirmir was arrested at his home the following day on March 20. Officers had seen Chemirmir discard a jewelry box in a dumpster before entering, and an examination of the item led police to a final victim, 81-year-old Lu Thi Harris (née Vang), who was found dead in her home the same evening. Bartel and Frisco resident Kay Lawson are the only known surviving victims.

== Chronology ==
Police categorized the deaths linked to Chemirmir as first taking place solely in Dallas through mid-late 2016 and again through late 2017 to early 2018, broadening out to the counties of Collin and Denton. Twenty-two of the victims were killed while two survived. The majority of victims were smothered with pillows while at least one died from blunt force trauma to the head. All but one were female.

=== Indicted murders and attacks ===
==== 2016 ====
- May 14, Edgemere, Dallas: Phyllis Payne (91)
- June 5, Edgemere: Phoebe Perry (94)
- July 18, The Tradition-Prestonwood, Dallas: Joyce Abramowitz (82)
- July 31, The Tradition-Prestonwood: Juanita Purdy (82)
- August 19, The Tradition-Prestonwood: Leah Corken (83)
- August 28, The Tradition-Prestonwood: Margaret White (86)
- October 8, The Tradition-Prestonwood: Norma French (85)
- October 15, The Tradition-Prestonwood: Glenna Day (87)
- October 29, The Tradition-Prestonwood: Doris Gleason (92)

==== 2017 ====
- September 2, Parkview, Frisco: Helen Lee (82)
- September 17, Parkview: Marilyn Bixler (90)
- October 29, Parkview: Kay Lawson (93), survived
- October 31, Preston Place, Plano: Minnie Campbell (84)
- December 3, Preston Place: Diane Delahunty (79)
- December 9, Preston Place: Mamie Dell Miya (93)
- December 23: The Tradition-Prestonwood: Doris Wasserman (90)
- December 31, private home, Plano: Carolyn MacPhee (81)

==== 2018 ====
- January 19, private home, Dallas: Rosemary Curtis (75)
- January 31, private home, Richardson: Mary Brooks (88)
- March 4, Preston Place: Martha Williams (80)
- March 9, Preston Place: Miriam Nelson (81)
- March 18, Preston Place: Ann Conklin (82)
- March 19, Preston Place: Mary Bartel (91), survived
- March 20, private home, Dallas: Lu Thi Harris (81)

=== Suspected murders ===
- April 8, 2016, Edgemere, Dallas: Catherine Probst Sinclair (87)
- October 1, 2016, The Tradition-Prestonwood, Dallas: Solomon Spring (89)
- December 10, 2017: Preston Place, Plano: Unnamed woman (81)

== Trial ==
At his trial, Chemirmir was accused of smothering 81-year-old Lu Thi Harris to death. He was indicted on 11 additional counts of capital murder in May 2019. On February 7, 2020, trial was set for April 5, 2021. The trial was later delayed to November 12, 2021. Chemirmir's trial began November 15, 2021. On November 19, 2021, a judge declared a mistrial due to an 11–1 jury deadlock. Chemirmir's retrial began April 25, 2022.

On April 28, 2022, Chemirmir was convicted in the murder of Harris and was sentenced to life in prison. Dallas County District Attorney John Creuzot told families in May 2021 that his office would not seek a death sentence for Chemirmir.

On August 24, 2023, Collin County District Attorney Greg Willis announced he also would not seek the death penalty for Chemirmir. Chemirmir's trial for the murder of 87-year-old Mary Brooks began on October 3, 2022. On October 7, 2022, Chemirmir was convicted in the murder of Mary Brooks and was sentenced to life in prison. After his convictions, the remaining charges against Chemirmir were dismissed, which disappointed many of his victims' families.

== Death ==
Chemirmir was killed by his cellmate on September 19, 2023, at the Coffield Unit in Tennessee Colony, Anderson County, Texas. He was 50 years old. Chemirmir was fatally bludgeoned and attacked with an edged weapon. The alleged attacker was Wyatt Busby, who had been serving a 50-year sentence for the 2016 stabbing murder of a Houston area man. Prior to his death, Chemirmir had allegedly made sexual comments about his cellmate's children. As of 2024, it is not publicly known whether Busby faced legal charges as a result of Chemirmir's killing.
