= Hornbuckle =

Hornbuckle is a surname. Notable people with the surname include:

- Alexis Hornbuckle (born 1985), American basketball player
- Dan Hornbuckle (born 1980), American mixed martial artist
- Sean Hornbuckle (born 1985), American politician from West Virginia
- Terry Hornbuckle (born 1962), American pastor convicted of rape

== See also ==
- Hornbuckle, a character rumored to exist in Mortal Kombat II as a result of a joke hidden in certain versions of the game
