= Cruz v. Beto =

- Supreme Court of the United States

Decided March 20, 1972
- Full case name: Cruz v. Beto, Corrections Director
- Citations: 405 U.S. 319 (more) 92 S. Ct. 1079; 31 L. Ed. 2d 263

Holding
- Cruz cannot be denied a reasonable opportunity of pursuing his faith comparable to the opportunity afforded fellow prisoners who adhere to conventional religious precepts. Texas has violated the First and Fourteenth Amendments.

Court membership
- Chief Justice Warren E. Burger Associate Justices William O. Douglas · William J. Brennan Jr. Potter Stewart · Byron White; Thurgood Marshall · Harry Blackmun; Lewis F. Powell Jr. · William Rehnquist

Case opinions
- Per curiam
- Concurrence: Burger
- Concurrence: Blackmun
- Dissent: Rehnquist

Cruz v. Beto, 405 U.S. 319 (1972), was a United States Supreme Court case in which the court upheld a Free Exercise claim based on the allegations that the state of Texas had discriminated against a Buddhist prisoner by "denying him a reasonable opportunity to pursue his Buddhist faith comparable to that offered other prisoners adhering to conventional religious precepts."

== Background ==
Fred Arispe Cruz, a Mexican-American born in San Antonio, Texas in 1939, was often in trouble with the police in his teenage years and became addicted to heroin. In 1960, at 21, Cruz was arrested and convicted of “robbery by assault”. He was sentenced to 50 years in a state prison in 1961.

Cruz denied taking part in the robberies. Wanting to appeal his conviction but unable to afford a lawyer, Cruz began to read all of the law books that he could find in the prison library. Despite only having an 8th-grade education, Cruz filed his first pro se appeal to the robbery charge in 1962. Fed up with the harsh field labor, brutal corporal punishments, and arbitrary disciplinary hearings experienced by prisoners, Cruz used his newfound knowledge to write a lawsuit against the prison system.

Because of his “legal activities” Cruz was classified as an agitator and transferred to the “Ellis Unit” in 1963. At the Ellis Unit, Cruz was pushed to drop his lawsuit by enduring many hours of solitary confinement. In 1967 Cruz wrote to Reverend Hogen Fujimoto, minister in the Shin Buddhist Churches of America (BCA) to request information on Buddhism. Cruz shared the information he received with other inmates which landed him back in solitary, which at the time meant a bread and water diet with a small meal served every third day.

Despite the abusive conditions, Cruz succeeded in filing his own lawsuit as well as those of other inmates. One of the suits Cruz assisted with is that of a Muslim at the facility who argued that his civil rights were being violated. Warden McAdams punished two inmates for the incident and kept Muslim prisoners at work in the fields six days a week instead of the five days assigned to other inmates. Within days a riot broke out in the Muslim cell block.

This 1968 riot was the first at Ellis Unit and helped build solidarity among prisoners and gain the attention of outsiders. One of these outsiders was Frances Jalet (later Frances Jalet-Cruz, as Cruz and Jalet were married after his prison release), an attorney whom Cruz had contacted in 1967 after reading about her in a newspaper. Jalet, along with attorney William Bennett Turner, would assist Cruz in his watershed case, Cruz v. Beto.

== Case ==
Cruz filed a lawsuit against the by the Texas Department of Corrections director George Beto. A Buddhist, Cruz complained that he was not allowed to use the prison chapel, that he was prohibited from writing to his religious advisor, and that he was placed in solitary confinement for sharing his religious material with other prisoners. Cruz filed the lawsuit using his own toilet paper ration. The Federal District Court initially denied relief without a hearing or findings, holding the complaint to be in an area that should be left "to the sound discretion of prison administration."

An amended complaint argued that:

"While prisoners who are members of other religious sects are allowed to use the prison chapel, Cruz is not. He shared his Buddhist religious material with other prisoners and, according to the allegations, in retaliation was placed in solitary confinement on a diet of bread and water for two weeks, without access to newspapers, magazines, or other sources of news. He also alleged that he was prohibited from corresponding with his religious advisor in the Buddhist sect."

and contrasted that with the fact that the prison:

"...encourages inmates to participate in other religious programs, providing at state expense chaplains of the Catholic, Jewish, and Protestant faiths; providing also at state expense copies of the Jewish and Christian Bibles, and conducting weekly Sunday school classes and religious services. According to the allegations, points of good merit are given to prisoners as a reward for attending orthodox religious services, those points enhancing a prisoner's eligibility for desirable job assignments and early parole consideration"

so:

"...plaintiff and the members of the class he represents are being subjected to an arbitrary and unreasonable exclusion without any lawful justification which invidiously discriminates against them in violation of their constitutional right of religious freedom and denies them equal protection of the laws."

== Outcome ==
The court found that:

"Texas has discriminated against petitioner by denying him a reasonable opportunity to pursue his Buddhist faith comparable to that offered other prisoners adhering to conventional religious precepts..."

== Concurrence ==
Chief Justice Warren Burger concurred in the result: "I concur in the result reached even though the allegations of the complaint are on the borderline necessary to compel an evidentiary hearing. Some of the claims alleged are frivolous; others do not present justiciable issues. There cannot possibly be any constitutional or legal requirement that the government provides materials for every religion and sect practiced in this diverse country. At most, Buddhist materials cannot be denied to prisoners if someone offers to supply them".

== Dissenting opinion ==
Justice William Rehnquist offered a dissenting view of the decision. That dissent is summarized below:

Unlike the Court, I am not persuaded that the petitioner's complaint states a claim under the First Amendment, or that if the opinion of the Court of Appeals is vacated the trial court must necessarily conduct a trial upon the complaint.

Petitioner alleges that voluntary services are made available at prison facilities so that Protestants, Catholics, and Jews may attend church services of their choice. None of our prior holdings [405 U.S. 319, 324] indicates that such a program on the part of prison officials amounts to the establishment of a religion.

Petitioner is a prisoner serving 15 years for robbery in a Texas penitentiary. He is understandably not as free to practice his religion as if he were outside the prison walls. But there is no intimation in his pleadings that he is being punished for his religious views, as was the case in Cooper v. Pate, 378 U.S. 546 (1964)

None of our holdings under the First Amendment requires that, in addition to being allowed freedom of religious belief, prisoners be allowed freely to evangelize their views among other prisoners.

Presumably prison officials are not obligated to provide facilities for any particular denominational services within a prison, although once they undertake to provide them for some they must make only such reasonable distinctions as may survive analysis under the Equal Protection Clause. [405 U.S. 319, 325]

A long line of decisions by this Court has recognized that the "equal protection of the laws" guaranteed by the Fourteenth Amendment is not to be applied in a precisely equivalent way in the multitudinous fact situations 405 U.S. 319, 326 that may confront the courts. On the one hand, we have held that racial classifications are "invidious" and "suspect." I think it is quite consistent with the intent of the framers of the Fourteenth Amendment, many of whom would doubtless be surprised to know that convicts came within its ambit, to treat prisoner claims at the other end of the spectrum from claims of racial discrimination. Absent a complaint alleging facts showing that the difference in treatment between the petitioner and his fellow Buddhists and practitioners of denominations with more numerous adherents could not reasonably be justified under any rational hypothesis, I would leave the matter in the hands of the prison officials.

It has been assumed that the dismissal by the trial court must be treated as proper only if the standard of Conley v. Gibson, 355 U.S. 41 (1957), would permit the grant of a motion under Fed. Rule Civ. Proc. 12 (b). I would not require the district court to inflexibly apply this general principle to the complaint of every inmate, who is in many respects in a different litigating posture than persons who are unconfined. The inmate stands to [405 U.S. 319, 327] gain something and loses nothing from a complaint stating facts that he is ultimately unable to prove. Though he may be denied legal relief, he will nonetheless have obtained a short sabbatical in the nearest federal courthouse. To expand the availability of such courtroom appearances by requiring the district court to construe [405 U.S. 319, 328] every inmate's complaint under the liberal rule of Conley v. Gibson deprives those courts of the latitude necessary to process this ever-increasing species of complaint.

In addition, the trial court had before it the dismissal of another of petitioner's cases filed shortly before the instant action, where the trial judge had been exposed to myriad previous actions and found them to be "voluminous, repetitious, duplicitous and in many instances deceitful." Whatever might be the posture of this constitutional claim if the petitioner had never flooded the courts with repetitive and duplicitous claims, and if it had not recently been adjudicated in an identical proceeding, I believe it could be dismissed as frivolous in the case before us.

A film chronicling the life of Fred Cruz was produced and directed by Susanne Mason. The film, Writ Writer, was broadcast/presented by PBS TV Broadcast on Independent Lens on Thursday, June 8, 2008.
