= Mark W. Michael Unit =

Men's prison in Texas, United States

- Interactive map of Mark W. Michael Unit
- Location: 2664 FM 2054 Tennessee Colony, Texas 75886; 31.7942667°N 095.9034500°W
- Status: Operational
- Security class: G1-G5, Administrative Segregation, Outside Trusty, Safekeeping
- Capacity: Unit: 2,984 Trusty Camp: 321
- Opened: September 1987
- Managed by: TDCJ Correctional Institutions Division
- Warden: Martin
- Website: www.tdcj.state.tx.us/unit_directory../mi.html

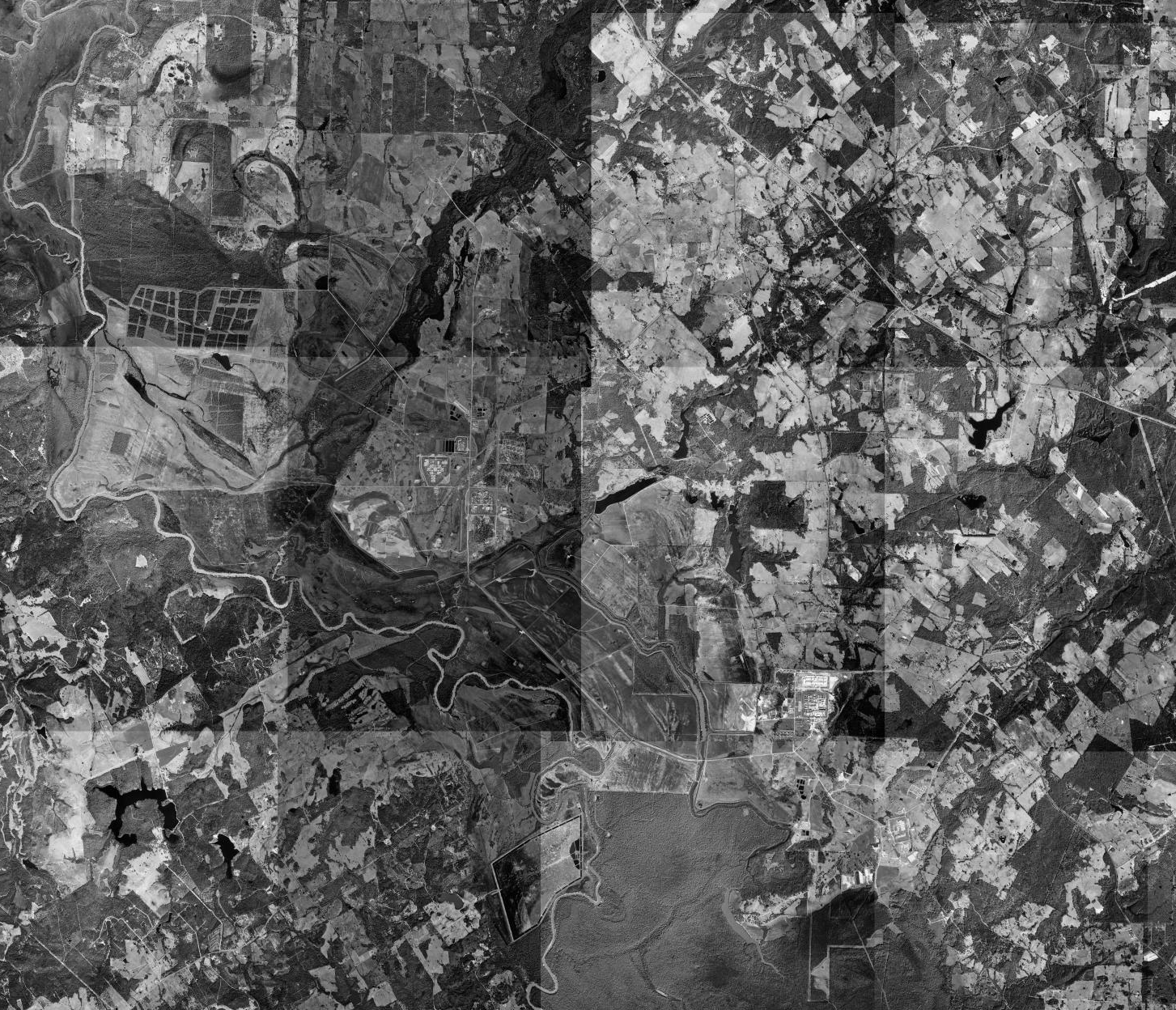
Aerial view of the Coffield Prison Farm Property (The Michael, Beto, Coffield, Gurney, and Powledge units)

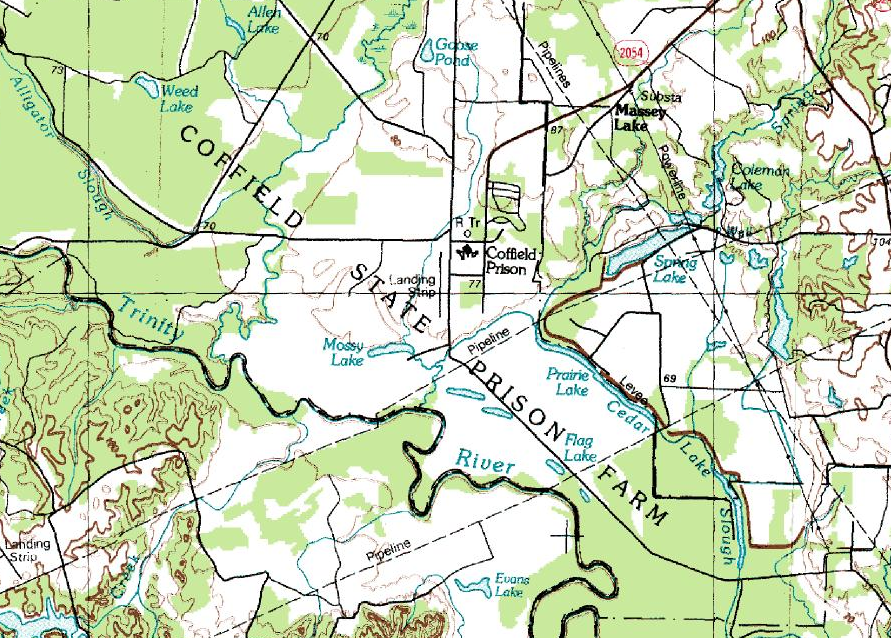
1977 United States Geological Survey map of the land which now houses the Michael Unit

The Mark W. Michael Unit (MI) is a Texas Department of Criminal Justice men's prison located in unincorporated Anderson County, Texas. The unit is along Farm to Market Road 2054, 4 miles (6.4 km) south of Tennessee Colony. The unit, on 20,518 acres (8,303 ha) of land, is co-located with the Beto, Coffield, and Powledge prison units and the Gurney Transfer Unit. The unit is in proximity to Palestine and the Rusk ironworks, and it is in about a one-hour driving distance from Dallas.

The Michael Unit opened in September 1987. Texas officials referred to the facility as "model for the future." Robert Perkinson, author of Texas Tough: The Rise of America's Prison Empire, described Michael as "one of the meanest lockups" in Texas.

== Operations ==
Michael was one of the first prisons to no longer use the "telephone-pole" layout, which has central pickets with dead-end cell blocks extending from them. The telephone-pole layout, while inexpensive to build, is difficult to police without "building tenders" (convicts paid to police other convicts). Instead, Michael uses a modular pod design, which allows for riot control and visual surveillance. Most pods have double-bunk, reinforced concrete cells with security features such as slit windows and bolted-down metal toilets. Some pods have dormitories. Michael was one of several new prisons to have the ability to have many prisoners in extended lockdowns. State officials said that Michael's features allowing for extended lockdowns of prisoners were modeled on the United States Penitentiary, Marion.

== Notable prisoners ==
Current:

Inmate Name	Register Number	Status	Details
Shannon Miles	07462349 / 02150490	Serving a life sentence without parole.	Perpetrator of the 2015 Murder of Darren Goforth, in which Miles killed him at a gas station.
Matt Baker	01634552	Serving a 65-year sentence.	Former pastor who murdered his wife Kari Baker.
Christian Cavazos aka “Guero10k” & “Houston’s top crash out”	02525215	Serving a life sentence.	Former “rapper” who was found guilty of murdering 5 people, 2 being an elderly couple he mistook as gang members.

Former:

- Richard Acosta Jr. - One of the perpetrators of the 2021 Garland Shooting serving life without parole. Currently incarcerated at Telford Unit
- Michael Morton - Exonerated of the crime which he was convicted of. He was transferred to Michael after obtaining his master's degree.
- Steven Jay Russell - The prisoner is a character in the film I Love You Phillip Morris
- Elmer Wayne Henley
