= Mark Stiles Unit =

Prison in Texas, United States

Mark W. Stiles Unit
- Location in Texas
- Location: 3060 FM 3514 Beaumont, Texas 77705; 29.9932333°N 094.0503167°W
- Status: Operational
- Security class: G1-G5, Security Detention, Safekeeping
- Capacity: 2,981
- Opened: June 1993
- Managed by: TDCJ Correctional Institutions Division
- Warden: Vernet Davis
- Website: tdcj.texas.gov/unit_directory/st.html

Mark W. Stiles Unit is a Texas Department of Criminal Justice men's prison located in an unincorporated area of Jefferson County, Texas, near Beaumont. The unit, located along Farm to Market Road 3514, is 4 miles (6.4 km) southeast of downtown Beaumont. The approximately 776 acres (314 ha) unit is co-located with the Gist Unit and the LeBlanc Unit.

The unit opened in June 1993. The unit serves as the University of Texas Medical Branch hub site for treatment of HIV and other infectious diseases. As a result, the Stiles facility houses many HIV positive prisoners. A hospice for prisoners with HIV opened at Stiles in 1997.

The unit has offered Buddhist meditation classes since 2003.

In 2011 the metal products plant closed; its operations were consolidated to the plants at the Coffield Unit and the Powledge Unit.

In 2023 the unit saw three inmate on inmate homicides. The homicides were part of a trend of rising violence in TDCJ facilities which prompted a statewide lockdown of all facilities.

== Notable prisoners ==
- Elmer Wayne Henley
- John Curtis Dewberry
- James Bergstrom
