= Joe F. Gurney Transfer Facility =

American law enforcement building

Coordinates: 31°45′32″N 95°49′22″W

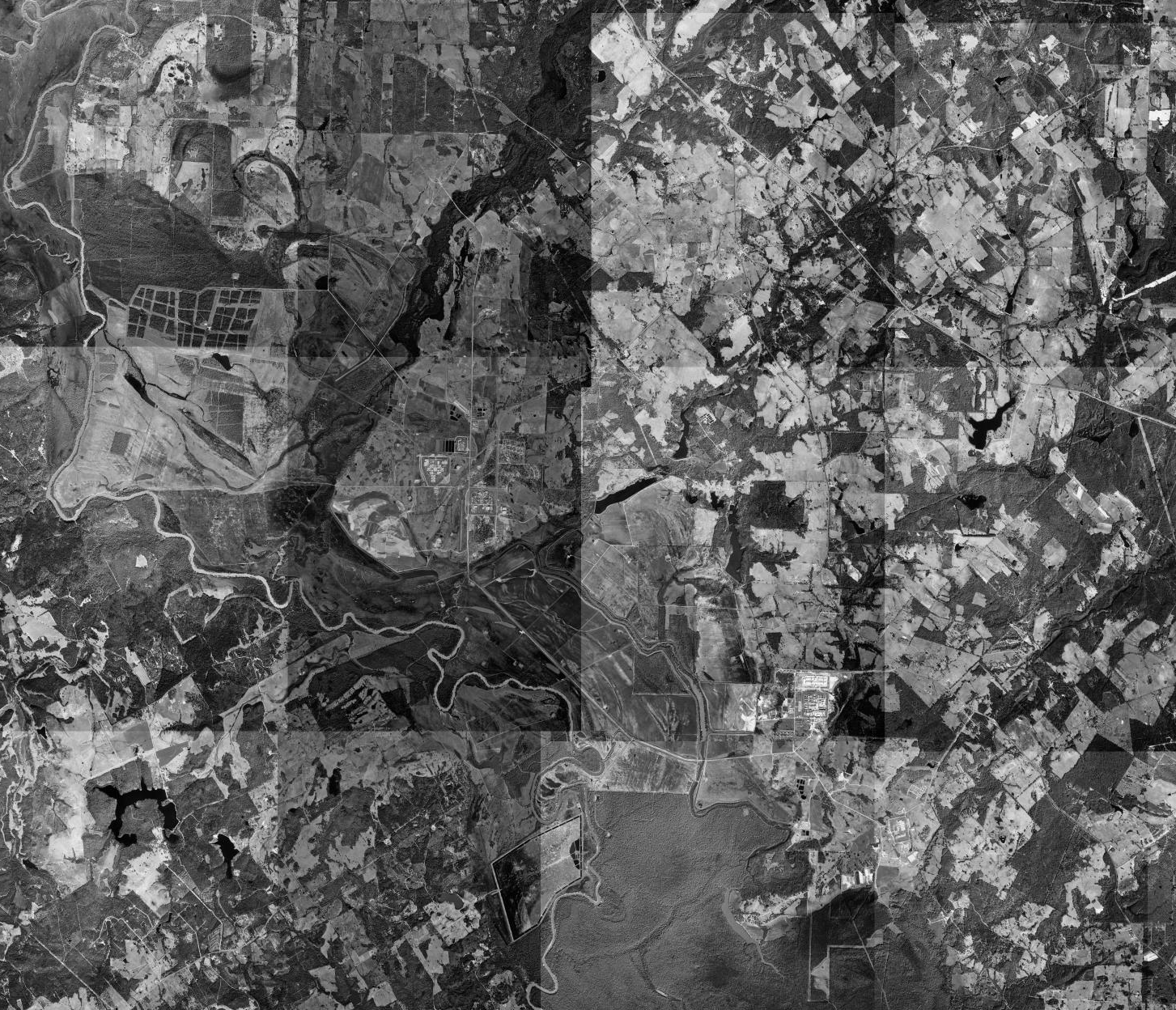
Aerial view of the Coffield Prison Farm Property (The Gurney, Beto, Coffield, Michael, and Powledge units)

The Joe F. Gurney Transfer Facility or Joe F. Gurney Unit (ND) is a Texas Department of Criminal Justice men's Transfer Unit located in unincorporated Anderson County, Texas. The unit is along Farm to Market Road 2054, 4 miles (6.4 km) south of Tennessee Colony. The unit, on 20,518 acres (8,303 ha) of land, is co-located with the Beto (directly across the road), Coffield, Michael and Powledge prison. The unit closed temporarily in December 2020.

It is named for Sergeant Joe F. Gurney. While working at Beto, Sergeant Gurney was killed when his horse fell and rolled over him.

== Gallery ==
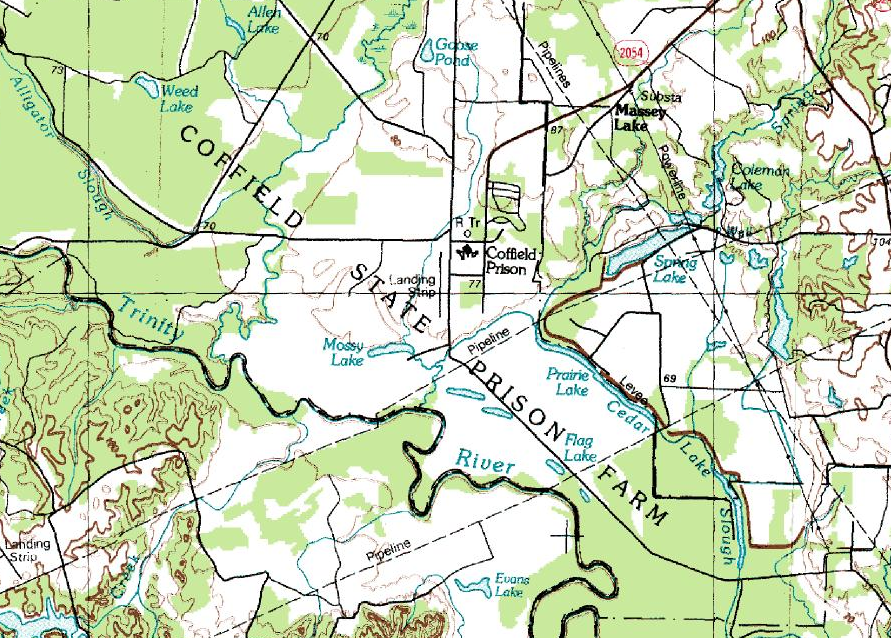
1977 United States Geological Survey map of the land which now houses the Gurney Unit

== Notable Inmates ==
- Scott Freeman, former voice actor for Funimation.
