= Louis C. Powledge Unit =

Minimum-security prison in Palestine, Texas

- Interactive map of Louis C. Powledge Unit
- Location: 1400 FM 3452 Palestine, Texas 75803; 31.7334000°N 095.8042833°W
- Status: Operational
- Security class: G2, G3, Administrative Segregation, Outside Trusty
- Capacity: Unit: 816 Trustee Camp: 321
- Opened: July 1982
- Former name: Beto II Unit
- Managed by: TDCJ Correctional Institutions Division
- Warden: Jimmy Bowman
- Website: www.tdcj.texas.gov/unit_directory/b2.html

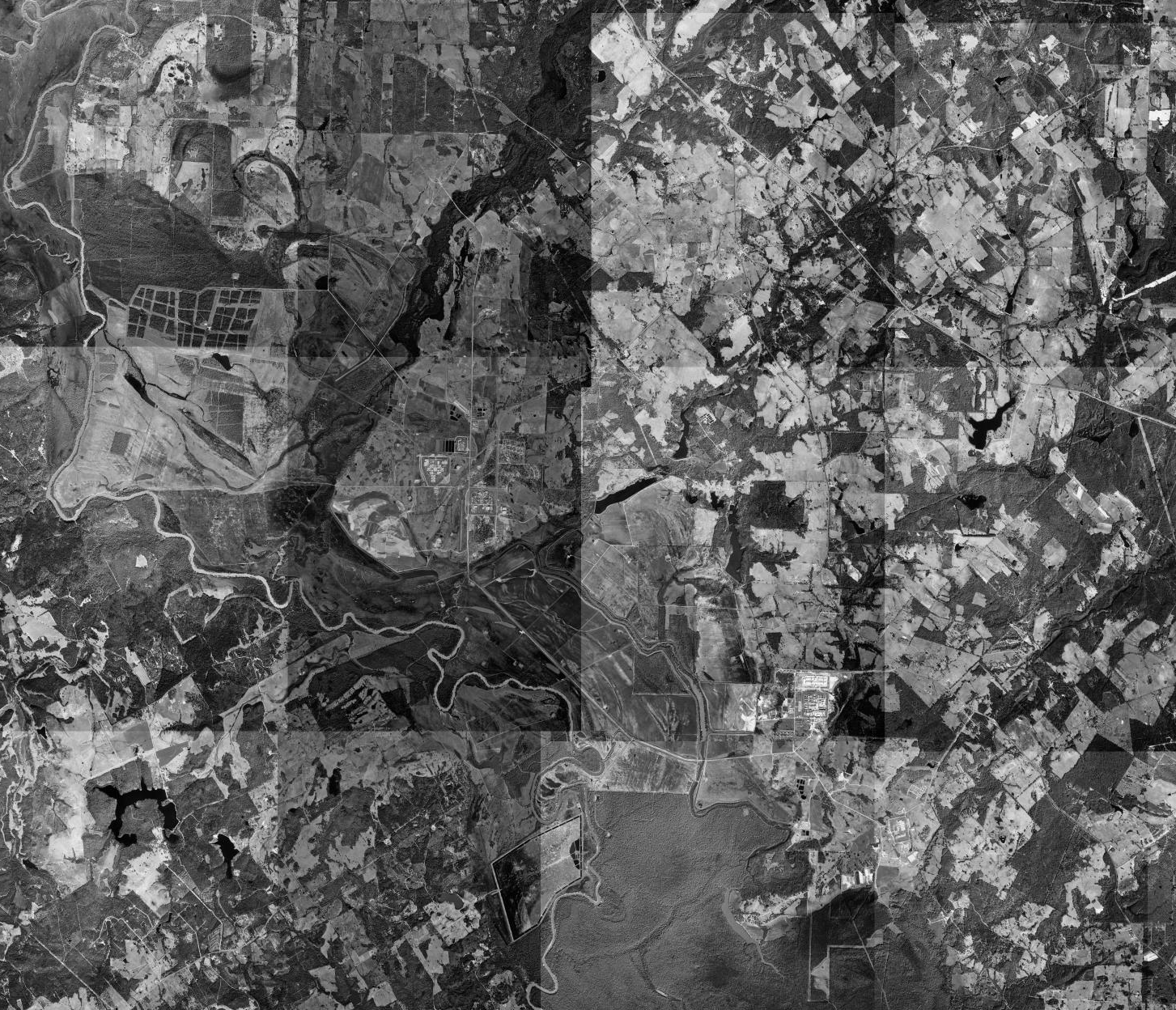
Aerial view of the Coffield Prison Farm Property (the Powledge, Beto, Coffield, Gurney, and Michael units)

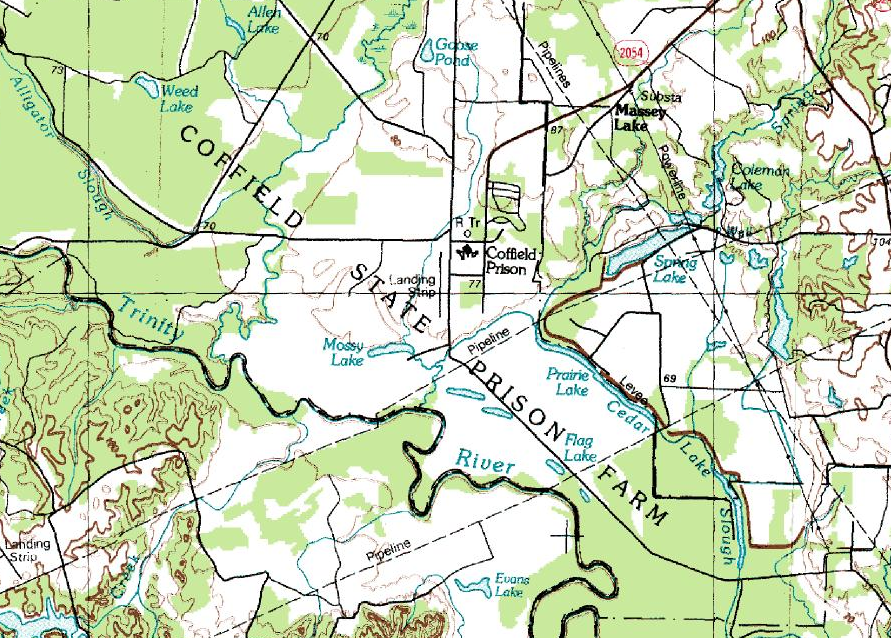
1977 United States Geological Survey map of the land which now houses the Powledge Unit

The Louis C. Powledge Unit (B2, originally the Beto II Unit) is a Texas Department of Criminal Justice (TDCJ) prison for men located in unincorporated Anderson County, Texas. The approximately 20,518-acre (8,303 ha) unit, co-located with the Beto, Coffield, and Michael prison units and the Gurney Unit transfer facility, is along Farm to Market Road 3452. The facility is located off of Farm to Market Road 645, 7 miles (11 km) west of Palestine.

The unit opened in July 1982 as the Beto II Unit. It was originally named after former Texas Department of Corrections (TDC) head George Beto. Construction of the bus repair facility began in October 1982 and ended in October 1984. The unit acquired additional acreage in October 1986. Construction of a 200-person trusty camp facility began in 1987 and ended in January 1989. In October 1988 the bus repair facility was converted into a manufacturer of dump beds and spreader boxes for the Highway Department dump trucks and of jail steel products for the construction of additional TDCJ units. The Louis C. Powledge Unit received its current name on May 5, 1995, after Louie C. Powledge, a former assistant director of contract construction.

In 2011, the Stiles Unit metal products plant closed. Its operations were consolidated with those of Powledge and Coffield Unit.

== Notable offenders ==
Current (as of 2019):

- Patrick Crusius – perpetrator of the 2019 El Paso Walmart shooting
- Warren Jeffs – leader of Fundamentalist Church of Jesus Christ of Latter-Day Saints, convicted of aggravated sexual assault of multiple children

Former:

- Carlos Coy (South Park Mexican) – Houston, Texas rapper convicted of aggravated sexual assault of a child
- Eddie Ray Routh – serving life without parole for the murders of Chris Kyle and Chad Littlefield
- Royce Zeigler – convicted of the murder of Riley Ann Sawyers
- Terry Hornbuckle – former pastor in Arlington, Texas church, convicted of raping females in congregation
