= George Beto Unit =

Prison in Anderson County, Texas, US

- Location in Texas
- Location: 1391 FM 3328 Tennessee Colony, Texas, US; 31.7545333°N 95.822777°W
- Status: Operational
- Security class: G1-G5, Outside Trusty, Transient
- Capacity: Unit: 3,150 Trusty Camp: 321
- Opened: June 1980
- Managed by: TDCJ Correctional Institutions Division
- Warden: Terry Andrews
- Website: tdcj.texas.gov/unit_directory/b.html

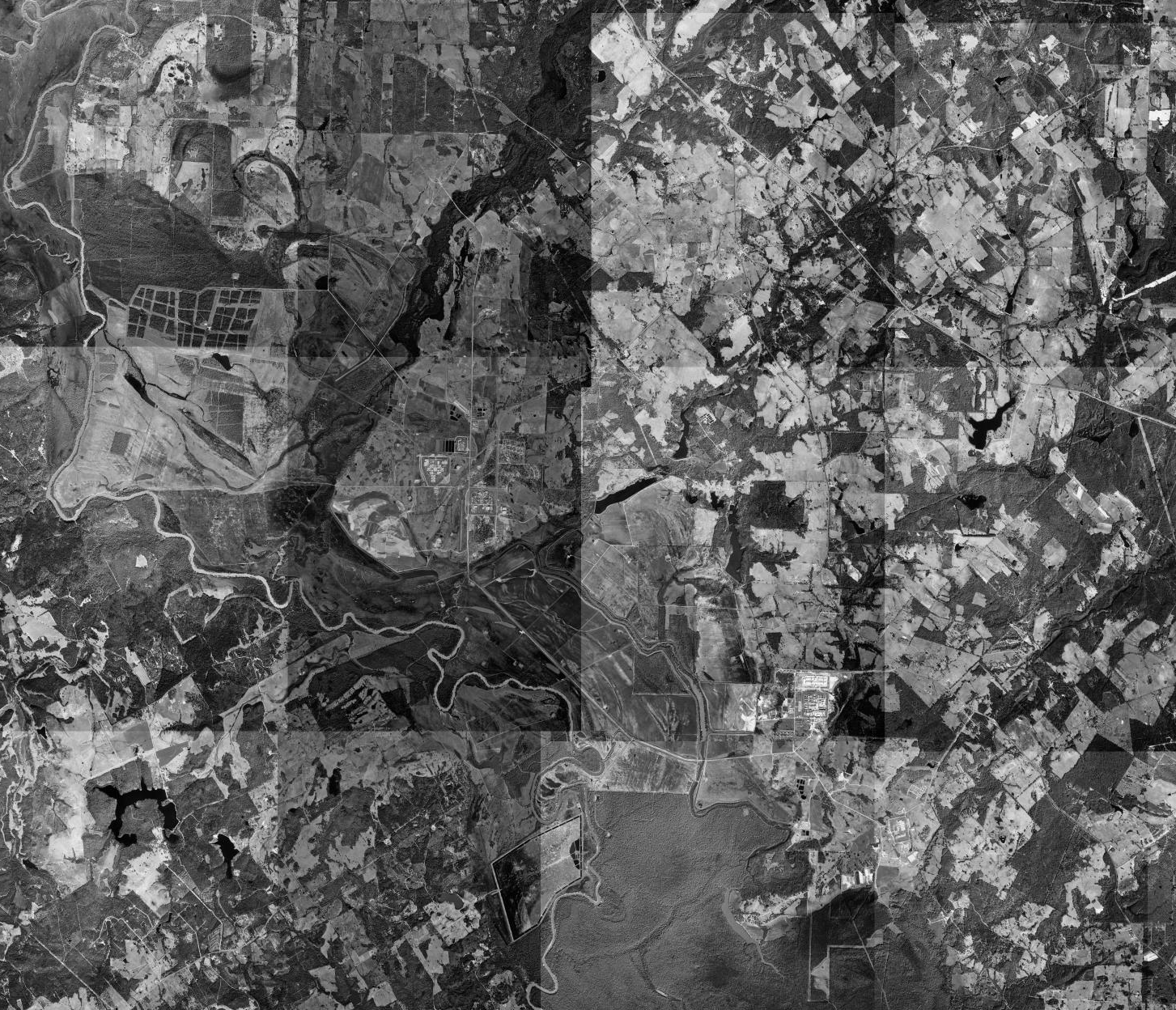
Aerial view of the Coffield Prison Farm Property (The Beto, Coffield, Gurney, Michael, and Powledge units)

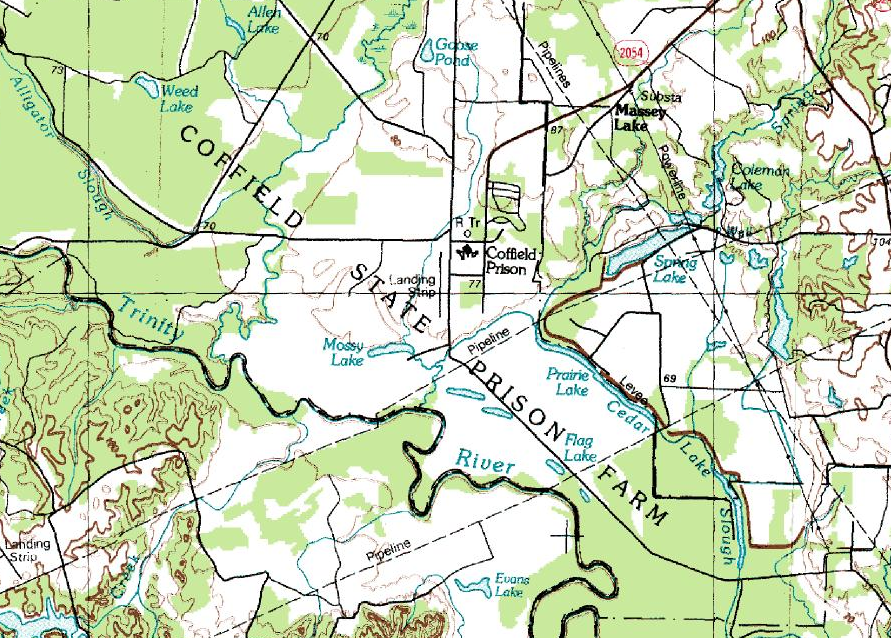
1977 United States Geological Survey map of the land which now houses the Beto Unit

The George Beto Unit (B) is a men's maximum security prison of the Texas Department of Criminal Justice located in unincorporated Anderson County, Texas, US. The unit is located along Farm to Market Road 3328, 6 miles (10 kilometers) south of Tennessee Colony. The prison, co-located with Coffield Unit, Michael Unit, and Powledge Unit prisons and the Gurney Unit transfer facility, has 20,518 acres (8,303 ha) of land. The unit currently houses over 3,400 offenders.

The unit opened in June 1980. It has the Correctional Institutions Division Region II Maintenance headquarters. The unit was named after George Beto, who served as prison director from 1962 to 1972. In 2008, Perryn Keys of the Beaumont Enterprise said that Beto "has been described as a gladiator’s playground — a hardcore joint, even as prisons go." That year, Ricardo Ainslie, an author and a professor in the educational psychology department of the University of Texas, said that when he toured Beto with the warden, he was "scared (expletive)." Joyce King, author of the 2002 book Hate Crime: The Story of a Dragging in Jasper, Texas, said that Beto's reputation as a "gladiator" prison stems from the fact that most of its prisoners are in their mid-20s, relatively young. As of that year, some inmates are at the equivalent of a 4th year high school student (senior), and a few are near their 30s. King also said "The dubious distinction is also a warning—gladiators either fight because they must or because they like to."

== History ==
In 2014, Curtis Garland, Jr., a prisoner from Dallas who began a 12-year sentence for family violence in 2012, died of an asthma attack. His family believed that prison officials did not disclose the true details related to the death.

On March 11, 2022, inmate Damien Bryant burned alive in his cell. After guards noticed smoke coming from his cell during a routine security check, they extinguished the fire and called EMS. Damien Bryant was pronounced dead on the scene by the attending Physician at Palestine Regional Hospital.

== Facility ==
Beto has housing for its warden. The warden housing, in one duplex unit, is a part of three duplexes. One other duplex has housing for the warden of another unit, and one is unoccupied as of 2002.

The prison places its confirmed gang members in the F Wing. The far southern wing, PTRC, is a pre-release wing.

The prison currently has three unoccupied wings that are kept for emergency overflow. The three wings are old administrative segregation wings from when the unit housed MROP offenders. Currently, the only occupied wings are A, B, C, D, E, G, H, I, J, K, L, M, N, P, T, U, O (transient wing), X (PHD, Seg, solitary wing).

== Custody levels ==
- General Population: G1 - G4
- Administrative Segregation
- Transient
- Outside
- Trusty

== Notable inmates ==
Inmate Name	Register Number	Status	Details
Raul Omar Villarreal	05128548 / 01306432	Serving a life sentence; eligible for parole in 2029.	One of six perpetrators of the 1993 Murders of Jennifer Ertman and Elizabeth Peña in which the two girls were brutally gang raped and tortured before being killed. Villarreal was originally given a death sentence.

- Lawrence Russell Brewer: murderer of James Byrd, Jr., executed in 2011.
- John William "Bill" King: murderer of James Byrd, Jr., executed in 2019.
