= Mel Hall =

American baseball player (born 1960)

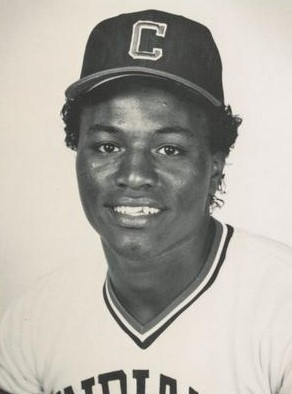
- Outfielder
- Born: September 16, 1960 (age 66); Lyons, New York, U.S.
- Batted: Left Threw: Left

Professional debut
- MLB: September 3, 1981, for the Chicago Cubs
- NPB: April 10, 1993, for the Chiba Lotte Marines

Last appearance
- NPB: June 27, 1995, for the Chunichi Dragons
- MLB: May 21, 1996, for the San Francisco Giants

MLB statistics
- Batting average: .276
- Home runs: 134
- Runs batted in: 620

NPB statistics
- Batting average: .278
- Home runs: 64
- Runs batted in: 207
- Stats at Baseball Reference

Teams
- Chicago Cubs (1981–1984); Cleveland Indians (1984–1988); New York Yankees (1989–1992); Chiba Lotte Marines (1993–1994); Chunichi Dragons (1995); San Francisco Giants (1996)
Criminal information
Status	Incarcerated at H. H. Coffield Unit of Texas Department of Criminal Justice; earliest possible parole November 15, 2031
Conviction	June 16, 2009
Criminal charges	Aggravated sexual assault of a child, indecency with a child
Penalty	45 years in prison, with 22 years and four months minimum

Melvin Hall Jr. (born September 16, 1960) is an American former professional baseball player who played in Major League Baseball (MLB) from 1981 to 1992 with the Chicago Cubs, Cleveland Indians, and New York Yankees, and in 1996 with the San Francisco Giants. He also played in Nippon Professional Baseball (NPB) from 1993 to 1995 with the Chiba Lotte Marines and Chunichi Dragons. Hall primarily played as an outfielder. In 2009, he was sentenced to 45 years in prison after being found guilty of two counts of sexual assault against minors.

== Playing career ==
Hall made his MLB debut in 1981 with the Chicago Cubs. In his first full major league season in 1983, Hall hit 17 home runs in 112 games. In 1987, he had the best fielding percentage and range factor of all MLB left-fielders.

On June 13, 1984, the Cubs traded Hall along with Joe Carter, Don Schulze, and Darryl Banks to the Cleveland Indians for Rick Sutcliffe, Ron Hassey, and George Frazier. On March 19, 1989, Cleveland traded Hall to the New York Yankees for Turner Ward and Joel Skinner.

In 1991, when Bernie Williams was a rookie, Hall taunted him by giving him the nickname "Zero". Hall reportedly would scream "Shut up, Zero!" whenever Williams would talk, nearly making him cry. In 1992, Hall hit 15 home runs, drove in a career-high 81 RBI and had a career high of 163 hits in 152 games with the New York Yankees. During that year's Yankees Old-Timers' Day, he walked onto the field and asked manager Buck Showalter, "Who are these old fucking guys?" Showalter said: "That's when I knew he had to go." That season he earned $1.2 million.

Hall became a free agent following the 1992 season. When no major league team showed interest in him, the 32-year-old Hall agreed to a two-year, $4 million contract with the Chiba Lotte Marines in Nippon Professional Baseball in Japan. In 1995, he played for the Chunichi Dragons. He returned to MLB to play for the San Francisco Giants in 1996, but was released a month into the season after hitting only three singles in 25 games. He signed a minor-league contract with the Chicago White Sox, but was released 12 days later after only playing four games with the Triple-A Nashville Sounds. He retired shortly thereafter. Hall played for three teams in the independent Central Baseball League in 2002 and 2003.

== Sexual assault conviction ==
Hall was arrested in Lewisville, Texas, on June 21, 2007, and charged with two counts of sexual assault after police in North Richland Hills, Texas, received a report from a woman who reported she was sexually assaulted in March 1999, when she was under the age of 17. During the investigation, a second victim under the age of 14 was identified. One of these girls was 12 at the time of the rape. On June 16, 2009, Hall was convicted on three counts of aggravated sexual assault of a child and two counts of indecency with a child. On June 17, 2009, he was sentenced to 45 years in prison, with 22 years and 4 months minimum. Hall is currently serving his sentence at H. H. Coffield Unit in Tennessee Colony, Texas; his earliest possible parole will be November 15, 2031, when he will be 71 years old.

In 2014, SB Nation published a long-form article detailing allegations that Hall serially preyed upon and sexually abused numerous girls throughout his career.

== See also ==
- Chad Curtis, former MLB player convicted of sexual assault
- Luis Polonia, former MLB player convicted of sexual assault

Preceded by Dusty Baker	National League Player of the Month; August 1983	Succeeded by Dale Murphy
