= Frances Jalet-Cruz =

American lawyer

- Born: Frances Tuckerman Freeman; November 10, 1910; Boston, Massachusetts, U.S.
- Died: November 29, 1994 (aged 84); Trumbull, Connecticut, U.S.
- Education: Harvard University (BA); Columbia University (JD, MEd); Georgetown University (LLM)
- Known for: Providing legal aid to Texas prison inmates
- Spouses: Jack Jalet (m. 1935; div. 1956) Fred Cruz (m. 1972; div. 1978)
- Children: 5

Frances Jalet-Cruz (November 10, 1910 – November 29, 1994) was an American lawyer who represented Texas inmates in a number of lawsuits against the Texas Department of Corrections. She was one of the central figures in the Texas prison reform movement during the late 1960s and 1970s that led to broad changes in the Texas prison system in the 1980s.

== Early life and career ==
Frances Tuckerman Freeman, born in Boston, Massachusetts on November 10, 1910. She attended Radcliffe College of Harvard University at age 16 and earned a degree in government in 1931. She and her fiance, Marius ("Jack") Stephens Jalet whom she met at Harvard, planned to go to law school but postponed law school and took jobs in New York. Frances worked at Sullivan and Cromwell in the secretarial pool (she could type 105 words per minute) and "Jack" Jalet worked as an "CB-OB" ("college boy-office boy") at Time Inc. In 1935, at age 24, Frances married Marius Jalet.

While pregnant with her first of five children, in 1937, Jalet received her J.D. from Columbia Law School and later, she obtained a degree in Education from Columbia Teachers College. She had decided to postpone the practice of law to teach elementary school in Norwalk and Darien, Connecticut (where she and her husband had settled) to be in close proximity to her children. When Frances Jalet was working for American Association of University Women in Washington, D. C., as Director of the "Status of Women", she obtained a master's degree in law from Georgetown University in 1958.

== Work in Texas ==
In 1967, Jalet applied for and received a Reginald Heber fellowship at the University of Pennsylvania School of Law where she studied poverty law with fifty other lawyers in a special program sponsored by the Office of Economic Opportunity. Upon completion of the six-week course in 1967, Jalet inquired as to where help was most needed and was told the State of Texas. So she moved to Austin, Texas and began her work for the Legal Aid and Defender Society of Travis County. She served as a legal aid or poverty lawyer in Dallas, Houston, and some years later in New York and Illinois.

While in Austin, Texas Department of Corrections (TDC) inmate, writ writer, Fred Arispe Cruz contacted Jalet to enlist her assistance in filing legal papers on his behalf. Shortly thereafter, Jalet began litigating for prisoners' rights, not only on Cruz's behalf but for other TDC inmates as well. Her work led Texas Penal Officials to organize other inmates to sue her, saying that she was fomenting rebellion among the inmates. These inmates later recanted their stories, dropping their suit. The attention she brought eventually led to a broader movement focusing on prison reform, and in the 1980s the Federal courts ordered sweeping changes in prisons statewide.

Jalet later worked as a legal aid lawyer in Austin, Dallas, Houston, and in New York and Illinois.

== Personal life ==
She caused a scandal when she married Fred Cruz in 1972 after his release from prison. She was then 61 years old and he was 32. They divorced six years later because of his return to heroin usage. Frances Jalet-Cruz died in Trumbull, Connecticut in December 1994 at the age of 84.

== In media ==
Her work with Fred Arispe Cruz was chronicled in:

- Writ Writer, 2008 documentary.
- Texas Prisons: The Walls Came Tumbling Down, by Steve J. Martin and Sheldon Ekland-Olson.
  The book's dedication cited "her unwavering belief in the rule of law."
- The Love Story that Upended the Prison, by Ethan Watters in Texas Monthly magazine, Jan 2019.

== See also ==
- Cruz v. Beto, 405 U.S. 319 (1972), the Supreme Court case she was involved in
