= Coffield Unit =

Men's prison in Texas, United States

H. H. Coffield Unit
- Interactive map of H. H. Coffield Unit
- Location: 2661 FM 2054 Tennessee Colony, Texas 75884; 31.7906000°N 095.8932667°W
- Status: Operational
- Security class: G1-G4, Administrative Segregation, Outside Trusty
- Capacity: Unit: 3,818; Trusty Camp:321
- Opened: June 1965
- Managed by: TDCJ Correctional Institutions Division
- Warden: Jamadre Enge
- Website: www.tdcj.state.tx.us/unit_directory/co.html

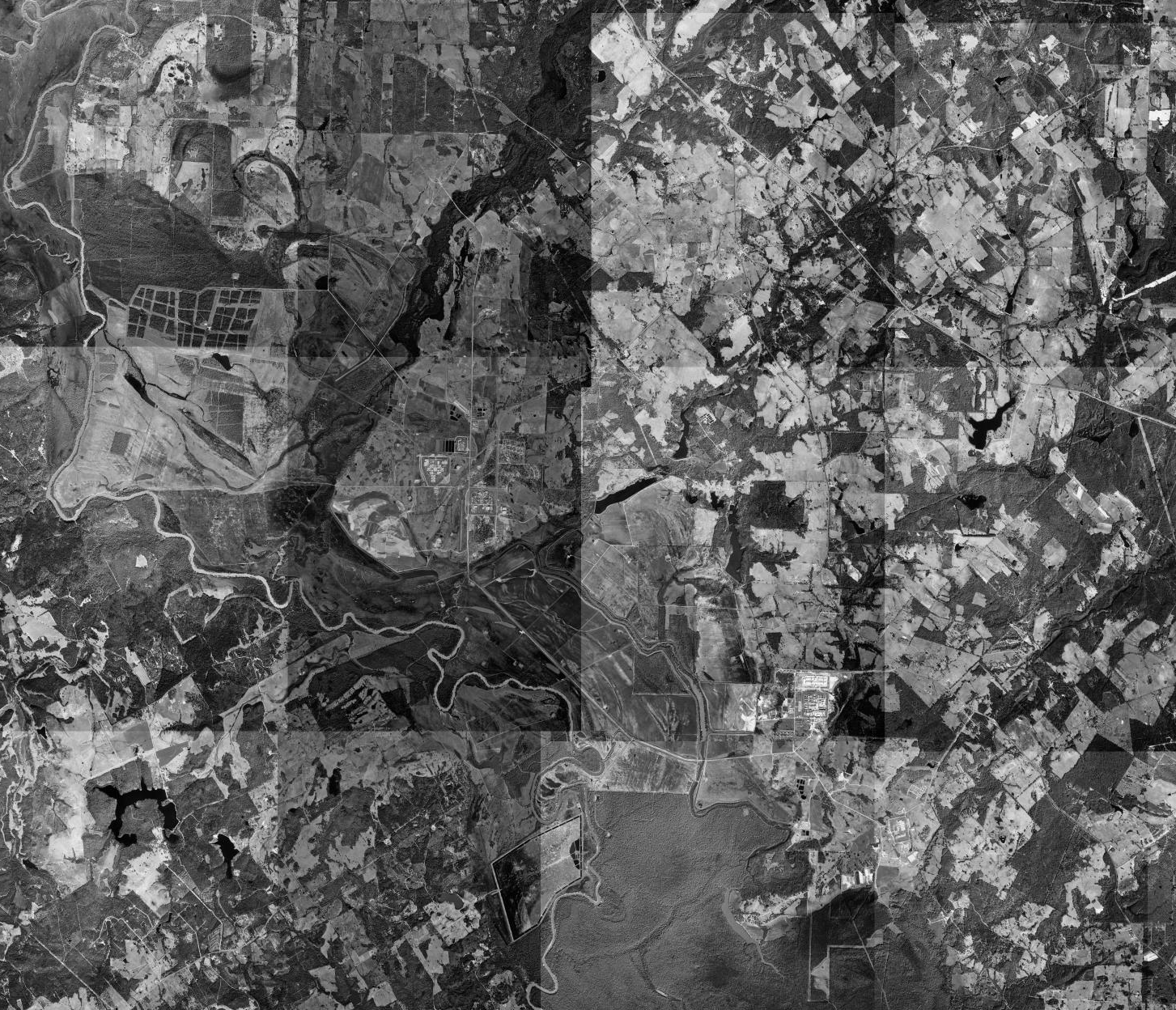
Aerial view of the Coffield Prison Farm Property (The Coffield, Beto, Gurney, Michael, and Powledge units)

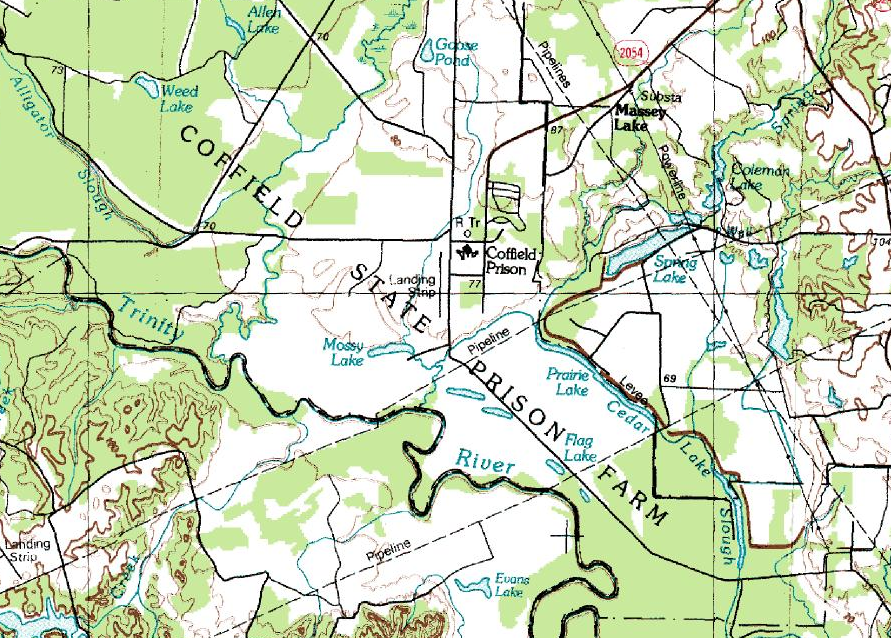
Topographic map of the Coffield State Prison Farm, July 1, 1977, U.S. Geological Survey

The H. H. Coffield Unit (CO) is a Texas Department of Criminal Justice prison for men in unincorporated Anderson County, Texas. The prison, near Tennessee Colony, is along Farm to Market Road 2054. The unit, on a 20,518 acres (8,303 ha) plot of land, is co-located with Beto, Gurney, Michael, and Powledge units. With a capacity of 4,139 inmates, Coffield is the TDCJ's largest prison. Coffield opened in June 1965.

In 2011 the Stiles Unit metal products plant closed. Its operations were consolidated with those of Coffield and Powledge Unit.

Coffield has employee housing.

In early 2019 Gateway Church opened its first prison campus inside Coffield.

== Notable Inmates ==
Current:

Inmate Name	Register Number	Status	Details
Joshua Luke Bagwell	05759612 / 00815991	Serving a life sentence. Eligible for parole in 2036.	One of three perpetrators of the 1996 rape and Murder of Heather Rich. The case experienced renewed attention after Bagwell, one of his co-defendants, and a few other inmates escaped custody in 2002, and after a 10 day manhunt were apprehended .
Mel Hall	06023953/01581384	40 year sentence. Eligible for parole in 2031.	Former Major League Baseball player (1981-92, 1996). Convicted of sexually assaulting two underage females.

Former:

- Billy Chemirmir (two time convicted murderer and alleged serial killer), killed in the prison on September 19, 2023, allegedly by Wyatt Busby, who was serving a 50 year sentence for murder in connection with the 2016 stabbing death of a man in the Houston area.
