= Terry Hornbuckle =

American serial rapist (born 1962)

Terry Hornbuckle (born February 2, 1962) is a former pastor from Texas who was convicted of raping members of his congregation.

Hornbuckle started Victory Temple Bible Church in Arlington, Texas with 15 members in 1986. The church moved into a former Dairy Queen building in 1987. The church was renamed Agape Christian Fellowship in 1992, and moved into an 8,000-square-foot (740 m^{2}) strip mall storefront in Arlington in 1995. Hornbuckle's church moved into a 30,000-square-foot (2,800 m^{2}), $3 million building in Arlington in 1999.

He earned a B.S. degree in Pre-Law/Business from the University of Texas at Arlington; a Pre-Law degree from the Oral Roberts University School of Law in Tulsa, Oklahoma; a Master's degree in Christian Education/Social Work from the Southwestern Theological Seminary in Fort Worth, Texas; and was trying to pursue a PhD in Conflicts Management at Trinity Theological Seminary in Newburgh, Indiana via the Internet.

On August 22, 2006, Hornbuckle was found guilty of drugging and raping three women. Two of the three women were members of his church. Hornbuckle was not freed at the end of his 15-year sentence as he was found to be a sexually violent predator likely to re-offend and was committed to a psychiatric institution.
