= Tennessee Colony, Texas =

Tennessee Colony
- Unincorporated community
- Location within the state of Texas Tennessee Colony (the United States)
- Coordinates: 31°50′8″N 95°50′20″W
- Country: United States
- State: Texas
- County: Anderson
- Elevation: 364 ft (111 m)

Population (2000)
  - Total: 150
- Time zone: UTC-6 (Central (CST))
  - Summer (DST): UTC-5 (CDT)
- ZIP codes: 75861, 75880, 75884, and 75886
- Area codes: 903, 430
- GNIS feature ID: 1348366

Tennessee Colony is an unincorporated community in Anderson County, in the U.S. state of Texas. According to the Handbook of Texas, the community had a population of 300 in 2000. It is located within the Palestine, Texas micropolitan area.

== History ==
Tennessee Colony was established in 1847 by settlers from Tennessee and Alabama, who named their settlement for one of their home states. The first settlers who settled in the community had the last names Shelton, Avant, Hank, and Seagler. The community's fertile soil and moist climate made it feasible to grow cotton, and several plantations were established, including the Jackson Plantation, which, at one time, was one of the largest plantations in East Texas. They were extremely successful. A post office was established at Tennessee Colony in 1852. Before the Civil War, as well as after, the community fell victim to racial tensions. Two white men from Mississippi named Cable and Wyrick were accused of plotting a slave uprising in 1860, suspected of encouraging slaves to kill most of the community's white residents by poisoning the water supply in the settlement. They were tried and hanged soon after. The nearby city of Palestine had the community's first railroad built there. As of 1884, Tennessee Colony boasted a population of 200 and three churches, a steam-powered gristmill, and a cotton gin. As the community's businesses moved to the nearby city of Palestine, the community's population plummeted over the next few decades. There were a few grocers and cotton gins in the area, and it eventually received a telephone connection. It functioned as a small cultural port in the 20th century. The population declined to just 100 people by 1914, rose again to 300 in 1927, but again declined during the 1930s. In 1941 there were 150 people in Tennessee Colony. A total of 21,000 acres of land was purchased just southwest of the settlement by the Texas Department of Corrections in 1965, and the first medium-security prison facility named the Coffield Unit was built in the community and held approximately 2,000 prisoners. It reached its population zenith of 400 by that year. Then the Beto Unit, the community's second prison, was finished in 1984. There were factories built for fabricating metal, as well as building concrete blocks and highway signs, in these prison facilities. It also had thriving agricultural and livestock operations. It had a steady population of 120 from the 1970s to 1990. It had a population of 300 in 2000. It currently has two historical markers, with one honoring the community, and the other commemorating the community's cemetery.

It was reported that the community's first businesses included a general store, a blacksmith shop, and a cabinet shop. Cotton was shipped on a ferry on the Trinity River. The community traded goods to cities as far as Dallas. Circuit riders held church services in their homes before the first log church was built, presumably in 1838. Another was built later on. A Masonic lodge was established in 1857. Another building that was used as a church, a school, and lodge was completed in 1860 and closed in 1948. Most of the community's current residents are descendants of the original settlers.

Although Tennessee Colony is unincorporated, it has a post office, with the ZIP code of 75861.

On November 15, 2015, a deadly mass shooting took place at a campsite between Tennessee Colony and Palestine, where six people were killed by an intoxicated neighbor upset about losing his family's land. The shooter, William Mitchell Hudson, was charged with capital murder and was sentenced to death by a Brazos County court on November 15, 2017.

The Los Mexicles street gang was founded in the community.

== Geography ==
Tennessee Colony stands along Farm to Market Road 321, 14 mi (23 km) northwest of Palestine, in the northwestern part of Anderson County.

== Education ==
A log school opened in Tennessee Colony in 1851, and the name of the teacher was Mr. Grant Kersky. A man named Seymour tried to open a school for African American children when he arrived in the community in 1869, but the white settlers ardently opposed this and forced him to leave. It had a school in 1884. Today the community is served by the Cayuga Independent School District. Schools in the community were classified as "outstanding" and were also taught by a teacher surnamed Hooker as well as Professor Sydney Newsome. They were supported by schools from Palestine and other nearby communities. The founders of Texas Christian University were alumni of the school.

== Government and infrastructure ==
Three major Texas Department of Criminal Justice correctional facilities, the George Beto Unit, the Coffield Unit, and the Mark W. Michael Unit, are located near Tennessee Colony and use the community's name in their mailing addresses. They are all co-located with the Louis C. Powledge Unit and the Gurney Unit, which use Palestine mailing addresses.

== Notable person ==
- Mel Hall, former baseball player serving a 45-year prison sentence at the Coffield Unit.
