= List of Texas state prisons =

This is a list of state prisons in Texas.

The list includes only those facilities under the supervision of the Texas Department of Criminal Justice and includes some facilities operated under contract by private entities to TDCJ. It does not include federal prisons or county jails, nor does it include the North Texas State Hospital; though the facility houses those classified as "criminally insane" (such as Andrea Yates) the facility is under the supervision of the Texas Department of State Health Services.

Facilities listed are for males unless otherwise stated.

== Facilities operated by the TDCJ ==
Texas state prisons

=== Prisons ===
Region I

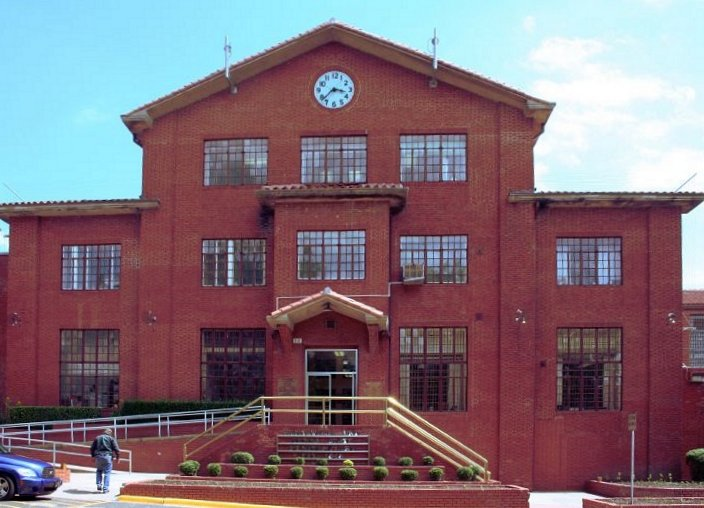
The Huntsville Unit in Huntsville is a prison operated by the Correctional Institutions Division; it houses the state execution chamber

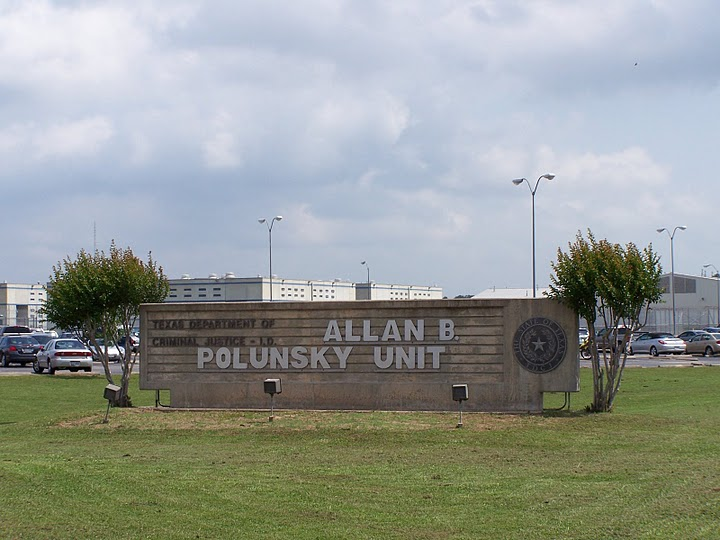
Allan B. Polunsky Unit, the location of the men's death row

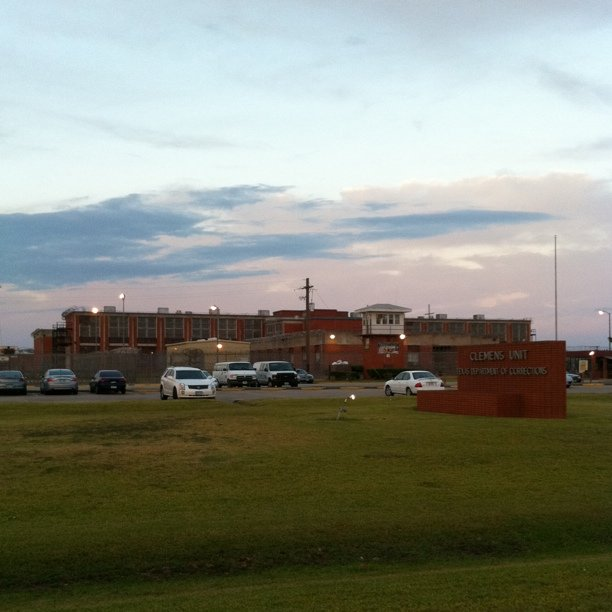
Clemens Unit

- Eastham Unit
- Ellis Unit
- W.J. Estelle Unit
- Ferguson Unit
- Thomas Goree Unit
- Huntsville Unit – Contains the state execution chamber
- Gib Lewis Unit
- Allan B. Polunsky Unit - Male death row
- Wynne Unit

Region II

- George Beto Unit
- William R. Boyd Unit
- Coffield Unit
- Mark W. Michael Unit
- Louis C. Powledge Unit
- Barry Telford Unit

Region III

- Clemens Unit
- Darrington Unit
- L.V. Hightower Unit
- Jester III Unit (formerly Harlem III)
- Ramsey Unit (formerly W. F. Ramsey I Unit)
- Mark W. Stiles Unit
- Richard P. LeBlanc Unit
- Stringfellow Unit (formerly W. F. Ramsey II Unit)
- Terrell Unit (formerly W. F. Ramsey III Unit)
- Carol Vance Unit (formerly Harlem II and Jester II)

Region IV

- Dolph Briscoe Unit
- John B. Connally Unit
- James Lynaugh Unit
- William G. McConnell Unit
- Clarence N. Stevenson Unit
- Ruben M. Torres Unit

Region V

- James V. Allred Unit
- William P. "Bill" Clements Unit
- Dalhart Unit
- Price Daniel Unit
- Rufe Jordan Unit
- Nathaniel J. Neal Unit
  - It was previously the only unit for women in West Texas. In 1997 the TDCJ proposed changing it into a men's unit.
- T.L. Roach, Jr. Unit (Includes a Boot Camp)
- Preston E. Smith Unit
- Daniel Webster Wallace Unit

Region VI

- Crain Unit (Female) (Formerly the Gatesville Unit)
- Hilltop Unit (Female)
- William P. Hobby Unit (Female)
- Alfred D. Hughes Unit
- O.L. Luther Unit
- Bartlett State Jail
- Mountain View Unit (Female)
- Dr. Lane Murray Unit (Female)
- Wallace Pack Unit
- French M. Robertson Unit

=== State jails ===
Texas state jails

Region II

- Buster Cole State Jail
- Hutchins State Jail

Region III

- Larry Gist State Jail
- Dempsie Henley State Jail (Female)
- Pam Lychner State Jail (originally Atascocita Unit)
- Lucille G. Plane State Jail (Female)

Region IV

- Fabian Dale Dominguez State Jail
- Renaldo V. Lopez State Jail
- Joe Ney State Jail (originally the Hondo Unit)
- Rogelio Sanchez State Jail

Region V

- Marshall Formby State Jail
- J.B. Wheeler State Jail

Region VI

- Travis County State Jail
- Linda Woodman State Jail (Female)

=== Transfer facilities ===
Region I

- Glen Ray Goodman Unit
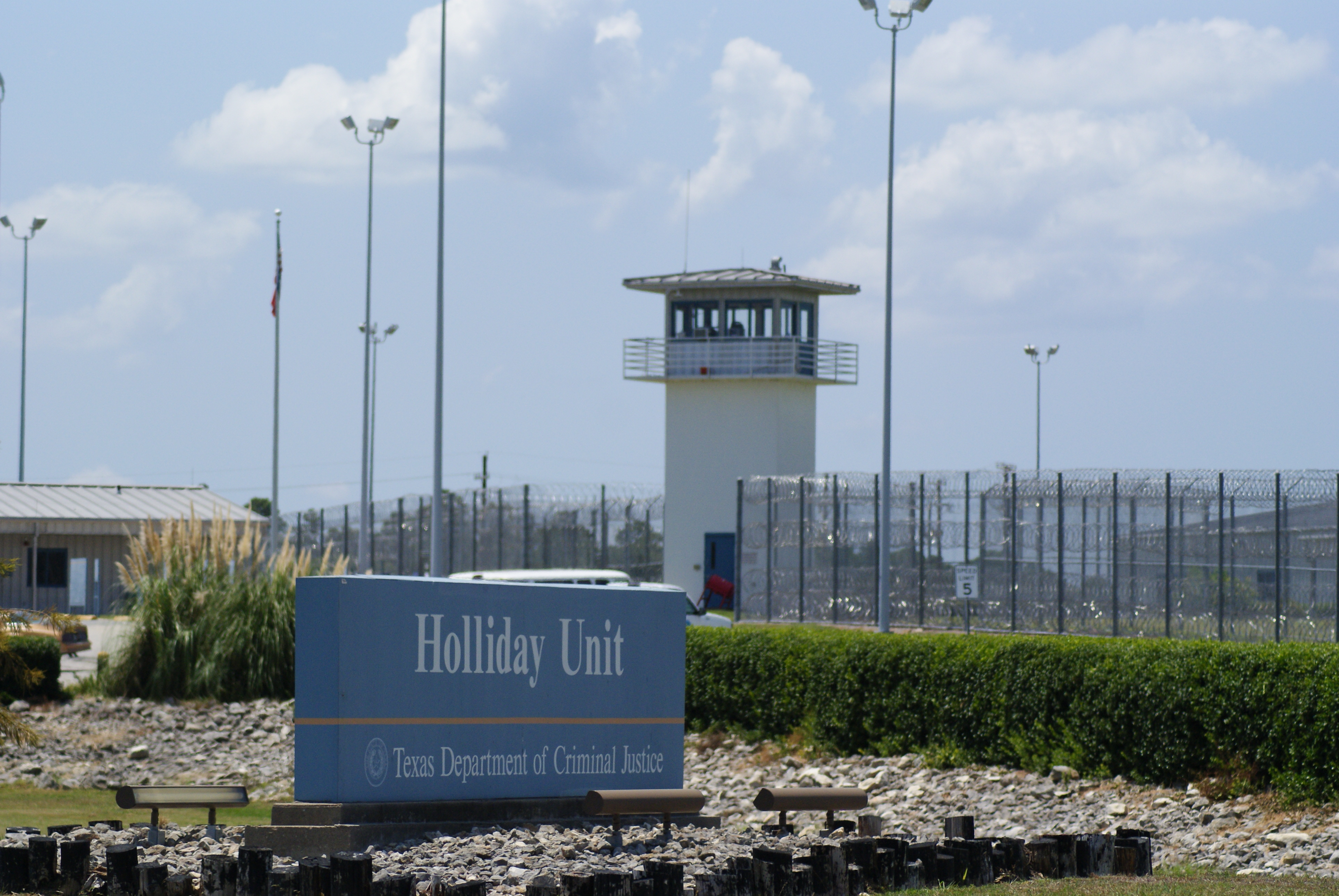
  C.A. Holliday Unit in Huntsville
- Joe F. Gurney Unit
- Reverend C.A. Holliday Unit

Region II

- Choice Moore Unit

Region III

- Cotulla Unit
- Fort Stockton Unit
- Garza East Unit (Originally Chase Field East Unit)
- Garza West Unit (Originally Chase Field West Unit)

Region V

- Jim Rudd Unit, named for former State Representative Jim Rudd of Brownfield
- Tulia Unit
- Dick Ware Unit

Region VI

- Marlin Unit
- John W. Middleton Unit
- San Saba Unit

=== Medical facilities ===
Texas prison medical facilities

Region III

- Hospital Galveston (Co-gender)
- Carole S. Young Medical Facility Complex (Female) (formerly Texas City Regional Medical Unit)

=== Pre-release facilities ===
Texas Pre-release facilities

Region III

- Richard J. LeBlanc Unit

Region IV

- Manuel A. Segovia Unit

Region VI

- Hamilton Unit
- Thomas Havins Unit

=== Substance abuse felony punishment facilities ===
Texas SAFPS

Region II

- Clyde M. Johnston Unit

Region III

- Jester I Unit

Region IV

- Ernestine Glossbrenner Unit

Region VI

- Ellen Halbert Unit (Female)
- Walker Sayle Unit

=== Psychiatric facilities ===
Texas psychiatric facilities

Region II

- Skyview Unit (Co-gender)

Region III

- Wayne Scott Unit (formerly Beauford H. Jester IV Unit), renamed in 2021

Region V

- Montford Psychiatric Unit

=== Geriatric facilities ===
Texas facilities for geriatrics and mentally disabled

Region I

- Rufus H. Duncan Geriatric Facility

=== Mentally challenged offender program ===
Region II

- Jerry H. Hodge Unit

== Privately operated facilities ==
=== Private prisons ===
- Bridgeport Unit
- Kyle Unit (previously known as the Kyle New Vision Unit)
- Lockhart Unit (female only)
- Billy Moore Unit

=== Private state jails ===
- Bradshaw State Jail
- Jesse R. Dawson Unit (Co-gender; closed)
- John R. Lindsey Unit
- Willacy County State Jail

=== Private pre-parole transfer facilities ===
- Bridgeport Unit
- Mineral Wells Unit

=== Private work programs ===
- Lockhart Unit

=== Private multi-use facilities ===
- East Texas Multi-Use Facility (Co-gender)

== Parole confinement facilities ==
Region III

- Joe Kegans State Jail

Region V

- William P. "Bill" Baten Unit

Private

- Burnet Unit (Co-gender)
- South Texas Unit (Closed)
- West Texas Unit

== Former facilities ==
- Bowie County Unit
- Central Unit (Closed 2011)
- Dickens County Unit
- Don Hutto Unit
- Jefferson County Unit
- Gregg County Unit
- Limestone County Unit
- North Texas Intermediate Sanctions Facility (closed 2011)
- Retrieve Unit (later Wayne Scott Unit) - Main prison closed in 2020
- Western Regional Medical Unit
