= Edward George McGregor =

American serial killer

- Born: March 29, 1973 (age 53); Missouri City, Texas, U.S.
- Conviction: Capital murder
- Penalty: Life imprisonment

Details
- Victims: 4
- Span of crimes: 1990–2006
- Country: United States
- State: Texas
- Date apprehended: May 1, 2006

Edward George McGregor (born March 29, 1973) is an American serial killer. A former UPS delivery driver, McGregor raped and killed four women in the Greater Houston area between 1990 and 2006. He was connected to the crimes via DNA evidence in 2006, after which he was convicted of one and sentenced to life imprisonment.

== Murders ==
=== Kim Wildman ===
At approximately 11:45 p.m. on April 17, 1990, the Missouri City police department received a frantic 911 call from a woman identifying herself as 38-year-old Kim Louis Wildman. Wildman reportedly was crying out for help claiming to have been stabbed multiple times in her home by a black man. The call abruptly ended, and police cars hurriedly drove to her home, and when they arrived they forced themselves in and found her nude body on the kitchen floor. It was later concluded that the killer entered the home through an unlocked window and that Wildman was likely asleep when she was attacked. Since she did not identify the attacker during the call, the recording was forwarded to the FBI for further investigation. At the same time, Missouri City detectives investigated Wildman's neighbors, including McGregor, at the time a 17-year-old who lived two houses down, who denied having any involvement in her death. Despite an extensive investigation, with even the Ku Klux Klan (KKK) putting up a $1,000 bounty to find the killer, the case stalled and the only piece of evidence of the perpetrator was his DNA. In 2001, the DNA was entered into the Combined DNA Index System (CODIS), but this failed to turn up any suspects.

=== Edwina Barnum ===
On May 25, 1994, at approximately 2:20 am, the neighbors of Edwina Latriss Barnum, 23, noticed her apartment door was slightly ajar. Upon realizing it had been kicked in they contacted the apartment management and entered the apartment. In the bathroom they located her dead body. Responding officers arrived, and along with a subsequent autopsy, they concluded that the killer had used a belt to strangle Barnum to death. They also stated that she had been murdered a few hours beforehand, likely when she returned home from work, and that the killer followed her back to the apartment. Investigators struggled to find potential suspects, and the case went cold. In 2004, on the ten-year anniversary of the murder, Barnum's mother, Betty Gregory, contacted the Houston Police Department pleading for a re-investigation. In a press conference for the ten-year anniversary, Gregory requested the department to open its own cold case unit.

=== Danielle Subjects ===
At around 1 p.m. on August 5, 2005, the roommates of 28-year-old Danielle Subjects let themselves into her home in South Houston and discovered her nude body lying over her partially filled bathtub. The previous day, Subjects had dropped off her two children at a daycare before returning home, and investigators believe she was killed at around 10:30 am. She had been stripped, sexually assaulted, and strangled to death, with her killer subsequently ransacking the house and rummaging through her purse before leaving. Male DNA was discovered at the crime scene.

=== Mandy Rubin ===
In the morning hours of February 4, 2006, at approximately 11:50 am, friends who came to visit 25-year-old Mandy Rubin in her apartment noticed that her door was unlocked. They called security personnel who arrived and discovered Rubin's body posed in her bathtub. No signs of forced entry were found during the investigation, but investigators suspected that due to marks on the body, Rubin likely fought with her killer. She too was sexually assaulted.

== Investigation and arrest ==
While investigating the murders of Subjects of Rubin, police noticed that the same phone number contacted the women just prior to their murders. Police identified the caller as McGregor, a resident of Houston who was a UPS delivery driver of eleven years and who lived in the same apartment building as Rubin. In April 2006, investigators in Missouri City were notified about McGregor, as he was making plans to leave Houston and move into his childhood home. Afterwards, former detectives with the Wildman case noticed that McGregor's former address was on the same street as Wildman's, and he was named the case's prime suspect shortly after. Investigators interviewed McGregor who again denied having murdered Wildman and voluntarily let police swab his mouth for DNA testing. When the results came back, his DNA was a match to the DNA found on Wildman's body, and on May 1 police pulled McGregor over as he was on route during his shift; he surrendered without incident and was taken into custody. McGregor was held on $1,000,000 bail, which was later reduced to $250,000 which he posted, and he was released from police custody later in May. His release sparked uproar in the community, and many Houston area residents protested outside his house.

On December 1, McGregor was re-arrested after his DNA was matched to Barnum's murder. For this he was jailed with a $750,000 bond. During his incarceration, McGregor was housed with a cellmate named Adam Osani. According to Osani, McGregor would often insult and fight him. On one occasion Osani claimed that a neighboring cellmate, Marvin Paxton, yelled at McGregor to leave Osani alone to which, according to both Paxton and Osani, McGregor blurted out "Bitch, I'll kill you like I did to those other two bitches".

== Trial and imprisonment ==
McGregor was only prosecuted in Wildman's murder, and he went to trial in 2010. Since McGregor was only 17 years old at the time of murder, prosecutors could not seek the death penalty and instead sought a life sentence. Despite the overwhelming evidence, including his alleged confession, McGregor openly stated that he was innocent. His family members believed him and took the stand during his trial. McGregor's brother, Tesfa, stated that on the night Wildman was killed, he and McGregor were up playing video games. In Tesfa's statements, he said he "dozed off" at around 11:00 p.m. and woke up later that night to hear some loud talking coming from outside. He claimed he saw McGregor enter his room and stated he was wearing the same clothes as he was earlier that night with no signs of a struggle, blood evidence, and any noticeable marks on his body.

McGregor's mother Sonia, also testified on her son's behalf. She stated the same story Tesfa did, but also claimed that McGregor had flirted with Wildman in the days leading up to her murder. She also said that McGregor reported having sex with Wildman, even though he was 17, and had been invited into her house on multiple occasions. Another witness, Delores Lee, who was serving time in prison for solicitation of capital murder testified that she lived across the street from Wildman in 1990 and stated that she overheard McGregor confess to the crime to himself. She claimed she only came out with this information now was due to the fact she had cancer. McGregor was found guilty and sentenced to life in prison with a minimum of 15 years served.

McGregor applied for parole in December 2021 but was denied. As of 2026, he is imprisoned at the Clarence N. Stevenson Unit in Cuero, Texas.

=== Alleged misconduct ===
In September 2016, McGregor and his lawyers requested a new trial. McGregor, who was still persisting he was innocent, argued that the DNA evidence was weak and circumstantial, and that the witnesses who testified against him should not have been trusted as they were convicted criminals. Later in November they also argued that one of the main witnesses against McGregor, Delores Lee, had fabricated her entire story. It was found that Lee did not live across from Wildman, nor did she have cancer, making all of her testimony questionable. McGregor had said that he had never known Lee and stated in a videotaped interview from 2009 "It's easy to go on TV and say these things, but remember you have to be able to prove them".

In November 2019 the main prosecutor in the case, Elizabeth Exley, was sanctioned for misconduct after it was discovered that she had spoken to McGregor's cellmates for information and failed to tell his defense attorneys about it. Exley claimed that, while she did fail to communicate with defense attorneys during the trial, McGregor nevertheless received a fair trial, and that's why his appeal was denied. She also claimed that what she did was not done in malicious intent, but it was done to ensure that a serial killer would remain behind bars for the rest of his life.

== See also ==
- List of serial killers in the United States
