= Dolph Briscoe Unit =

Prison in Frio County, Texas

- Location in Texas
- Location: 1459 West Highway 85 Dilley, Texas 78017; 28°39′36″N 99°11′20″W
- Status: Operational
- Security class: G1, G2, G4
- Capacity: 1,384
- Opened: January 1992
- Managed by: TDCJ Correctional Institutions Division
- Warden: John Cirone
- Website: www.tdcj.state.tx.us/unit_directory/db.html

The Dolph Briscoe Unit (DB) or Briscoe Unit is a Texas state prison located near the town of Dilley in Frio County, Texas.

The unit opened in January 1992 and is named for former Texas Governor Dolph Briscoe.

As of August 31, 2013 Briscoe Unit employs 233 people of which 165 are security related employees, 42 non security and 14 are employees of the Windham School District

Offenders in the unit may have access to literacy education, as well as adult education and GED courses through the Windham School District programs, as well as English as a second language, special education and pre-release courses. The unit also runs career and technology programs for inmates including: construction carpentry, electrical trades, landscape design, construction and maintenance. Offenders may also have the opportunity of working with local community works projects such as with the local food bank, Habitat for Humanity and other local organizations.

The unit also runs agricultural operations including maintenance of security animals (horses and dogs) and edible crops.

On April 6, 2010, two inmates, Jose Bustos-Diaz and Octavio Ramos Lopez escaped from the prison. Ramos Lopez was later captured four months later, he was found with 150 pounds of cocaine. Bustos-Diaz, who was serving a 35-year sentence for the murder of Deborah Kay in 2005, remains at large and is currently wanted by the U.S. Marshals.

In July 2021 the facility was cleared of domestic convicts and it is being rededicated to the incarceration of criminal border entrants under an order by Governor Abbott's Operation Lone Star.
