= Huntsville Regional Airport =

Airport in Texas, US

Bruce Brothers Huntsville Regional Airport Huntsville Municipal Airport
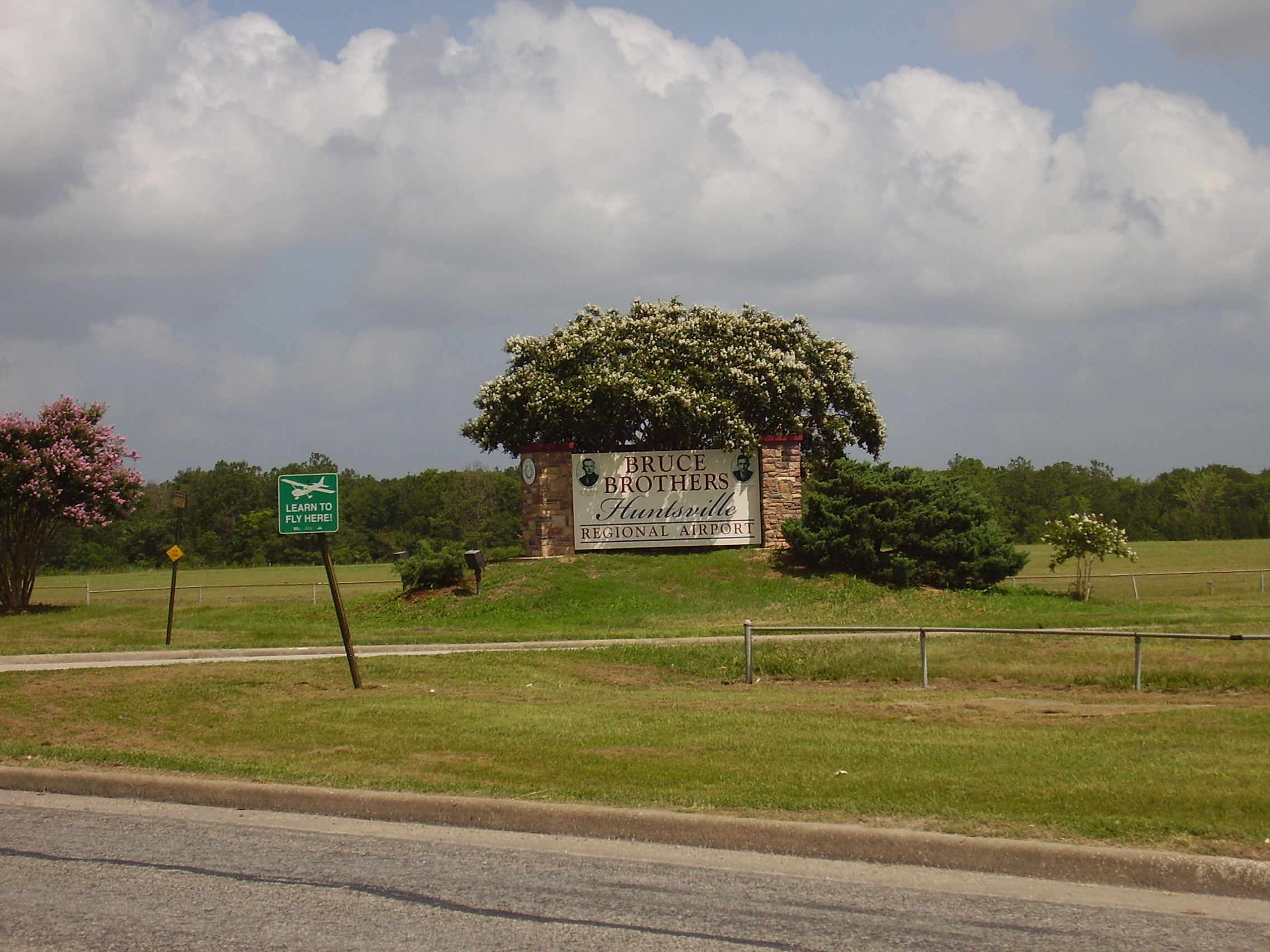
- Airport sign, July 2010
- IATA: HTV; ICAO: KUTS; FAA LID: UTS

Summary
- Airport type: Public
- Owner: City of Huntsville
- Serves: Huntsville, Texas
- Elevation AMSL: 363 ft (111 m)
- Coordinates: 30°44′49″N 095°35′14″W

Map
- Location of airport in Texas

Runways
| Direction | Length | | Surface |
| Direction | ft | m | Surface |
|---|---|---|---|
| 18/36 | 5,005 | 1,526 | Asphalt |

Statistics (2023)
- Aircraft operations (year ending 4/8/2023): 39,613
- Based aircraft: 52
- Source: Federal Aviation Administration

Bruce Brothers Huntsville Regional Airport (IATA: HTV, ICAO: KUTS, FAA LID: UTS), also known as Huntsville Municipal Airport, is a city-owned, public-use airport located two nautical miles (4 km) northwest of the central business district of Huntsville, a city in Walker County, Texas, United States. It is included in the National Plan of Integrated Airport Systems for 2011–2015, which categorized it as a general aviation facility.

This airport is assigned a three-letter location identifier of UTS by the Federal Aviation Administration, but the International Air Transport Association (IATA) airport code is HTV (the IATA assigned UTS to Ust-Tsilma Airport in Russia).

== History ==
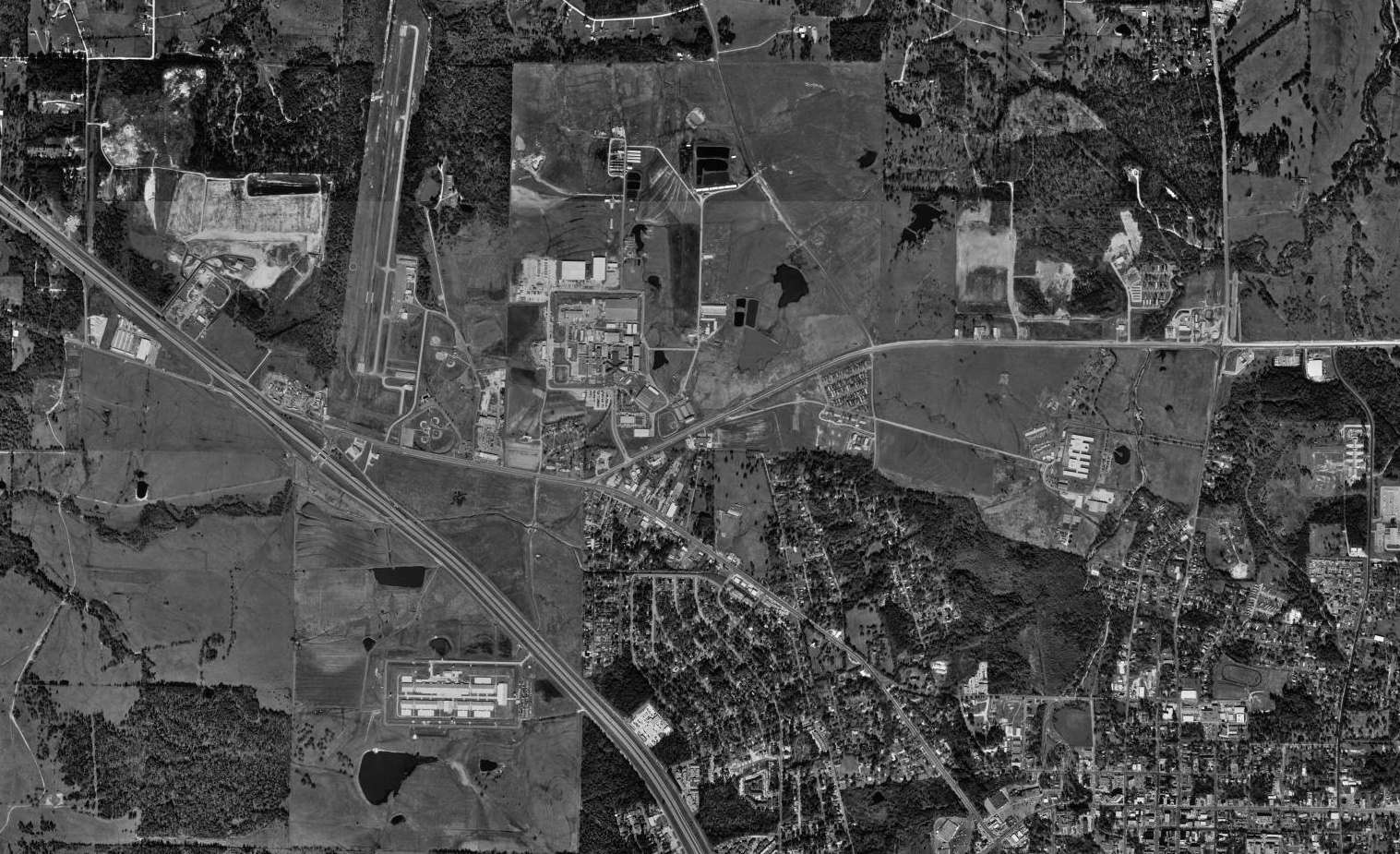
Aerial image of airport and Byrd, Holliday, and Wynne units – USGS 1995

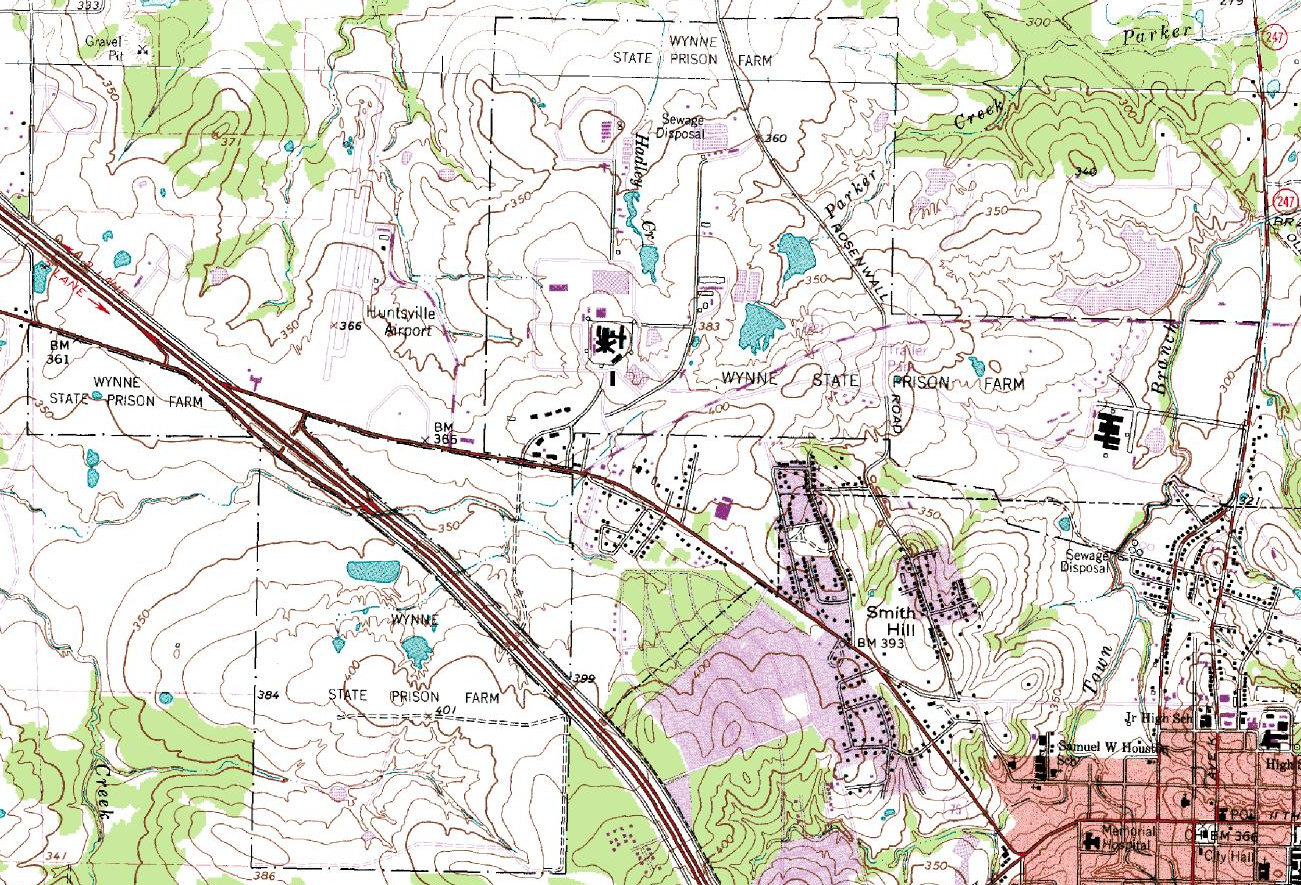
Topographical map of airport and Wynne Unit – USGS 1976

In 2009 the Huntsville City Council had approved a name change of the airport from Huntsville Municipal Airport to Bruce Brothers Huntsville Regional Airport. On May 28, 2010, the airport was rededicated in honor of two World War II veterans, Harry Joe Bruce and Reeves "Jeep" Bruce, who died during the course of that war. The ribbon cutting was scheduled to be held on that day. However, as of December 2015, it is still listed as Huntsville Municipal Airport by the Federal Aviation Administration and the Texas Department of Transportation.

== Facilities and aircraft ==
The airport covers an area of 180 acres (73 ha) at an elevation of 363 feet (111 m) above mean sea level. It has one runway designated 18/36 with an asphalt surface measuring 5,005 by 100 feet (1,526 x 30 m).

For the 12-month period ending April 8, 2023, the airport had 39,613 aircraft operations, an average of 108 per day: 89% general aviation, 11% military, and <1% air taxi. At that time there were 52 aircraft based at this airport: 46 single-engine, 4 multi-engine, and 2 jet.

== See also ==
- List of airports in Texas
