= Watchtower =

Type of fortification

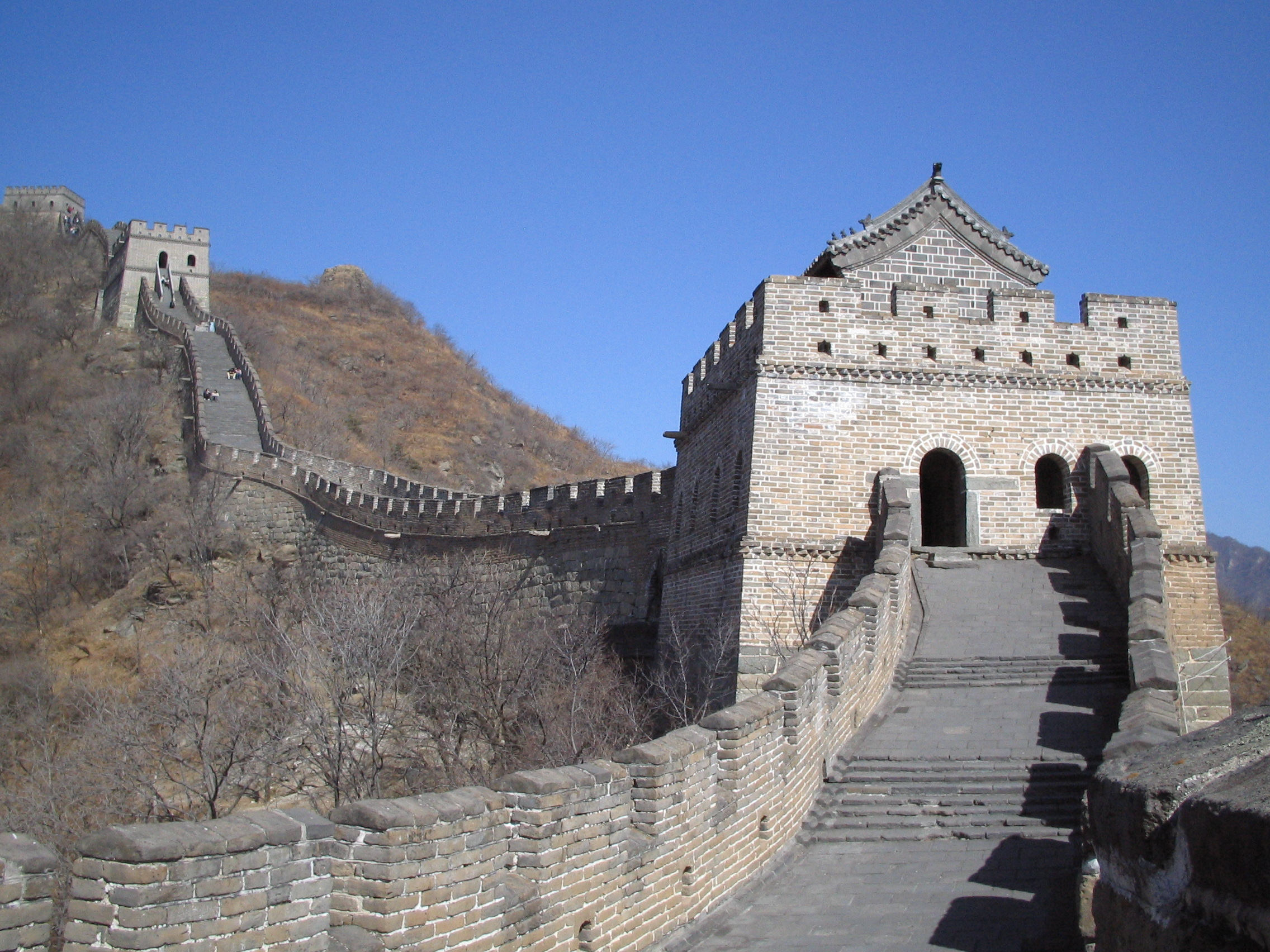
A watchtower on the Great Wall of China

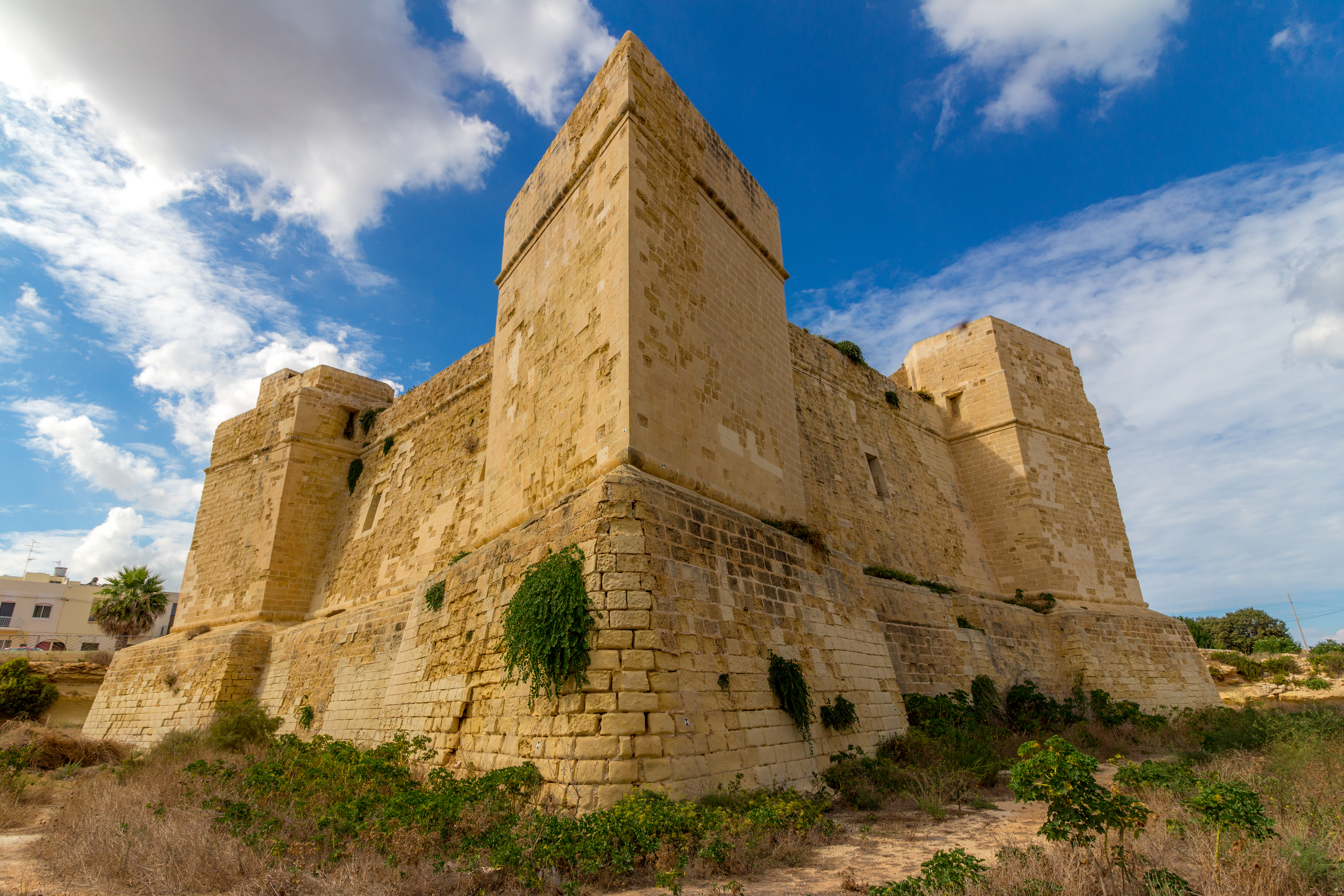
Saint Thomas Tower in Marsaskala, Malta

A watchtower or guardtower (also spelled watch tower, guard tower) is a type of military/paramilitary or policiary tower used for guarding an area. Sometimes fortified, and armed with heavy weaponry, especially historically, the structures are built in areas of established control. These include military bases, cities occupied by military forces, prisons and more. A common equipment is searchlights.

It differs from a regular tower in that its primary use is military/policiary and from a turret in that it is usually a freestanding structure. Its main purpose is to provide a high, safe place from which a sentinel or guard may observe the surrounding area. In some cases, non-military towers, such as religious towers, may also be used as watchtowers.

Similar constructions include: observation towers and belvederes, which are generally civilian structures, and control towers, used on airports or harbours.

== History ==
=== Military watchtowers ===
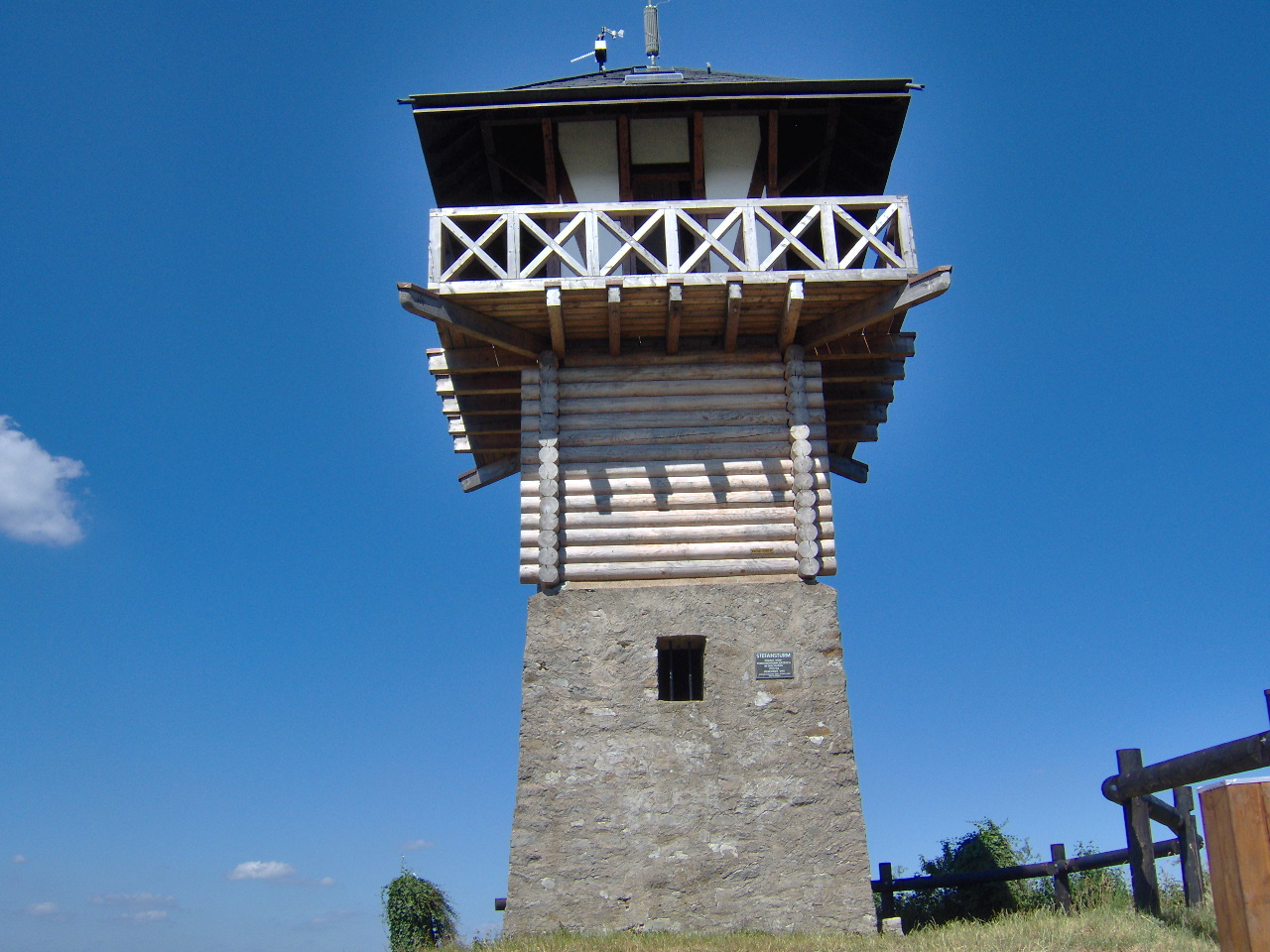
A reconstruction of a Roman watchtower in Germany

The Romans built numerous towers as part of a system of communications, one example being the towers along Hadrian's Wall in Britain. Romans built many lighthouses, such as the Tower of Hercules in northern Spain, which survives to this day as a working building, and the equally famous lighthouse at Dover Castle, which survives to about half its original height as a ruin.

In medieval Europe, many castles and manor houses, or similar fortified buildings, were equipped with watchtowers. In some of the manor houses of western France, the watchtower equipped with arrow or gun loopholes was one of the principal means of defense. A feudal lord could keep watch over his domain from the top of his tower.

In southern Saudi Arabia and Yemen, small stone and mud towers called "qasaba" were constructed as either watchtowers or keeps in the Asir mountains. Furthermore, in Najd, a watchtower, called "Margab", was used to watch for approaching enemies far in distance and shout calling warnings from atop.

Scotland saw the construction of Peel towers that combined the function of watchtower with that of a keep or tower house that served as the residence for a local notable family.

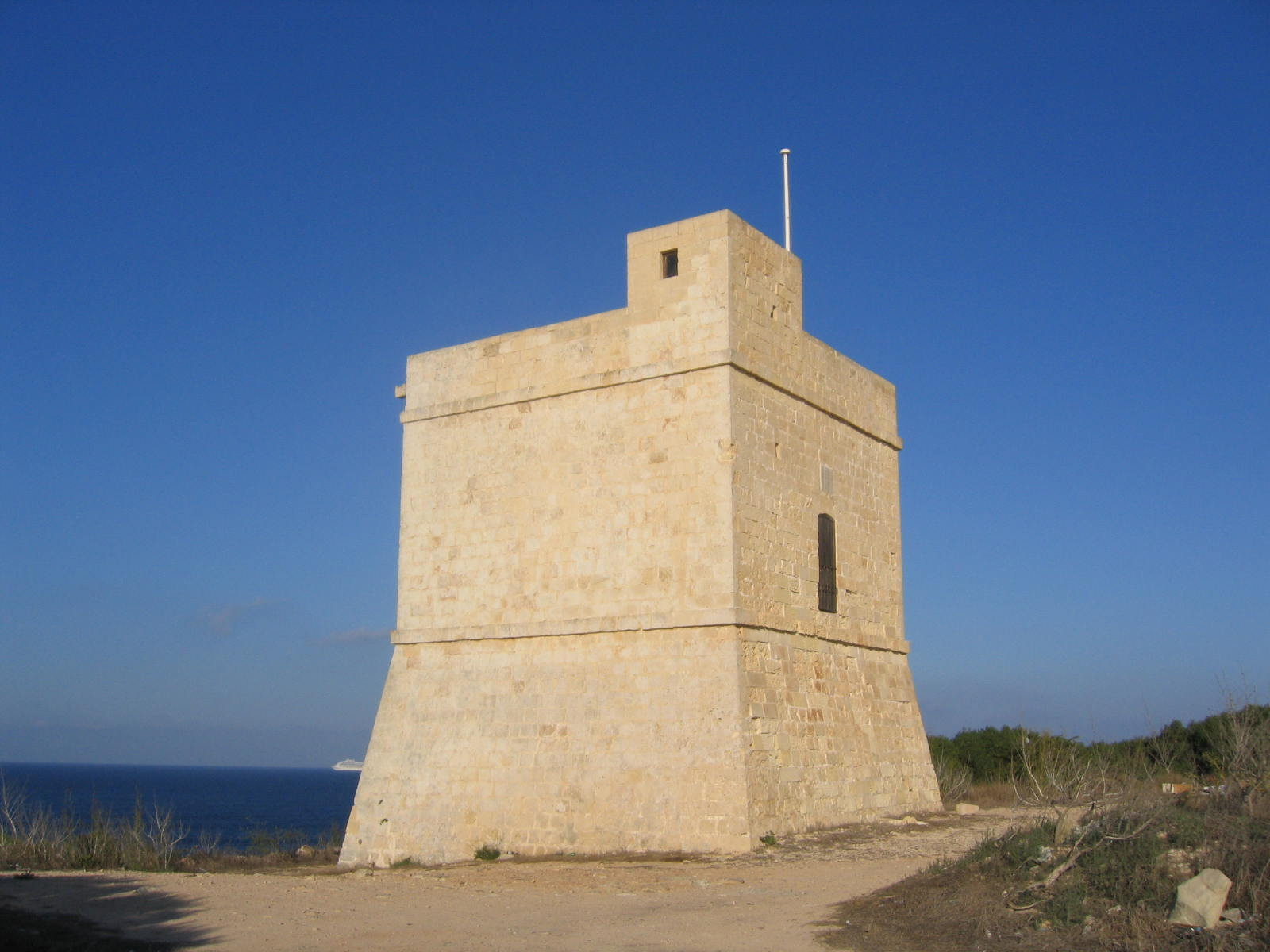
Għallis Tower, one of the 13 de Redin towers in Malta

Mediterranean countries, and Italy in particular, saw the construction of numerous coastal watchtowers since the early Middle Ages, connected to the menace of Saracen attacks from the various Muslim states existing at the time (such as the Balearic Islands, Ifriqiya or Sicily). Later (starting from the 16th century) many were restored or built against the Barbary pirates. Similarly, the city state of Hamburg gained political power in the 13th century over a remote island 150 kilometers down the Elbe river estuary to erect the Great Tower Neuwerk by 1310 to protect its trading routes. They also claimed customs at the watchtower protecting the passage.

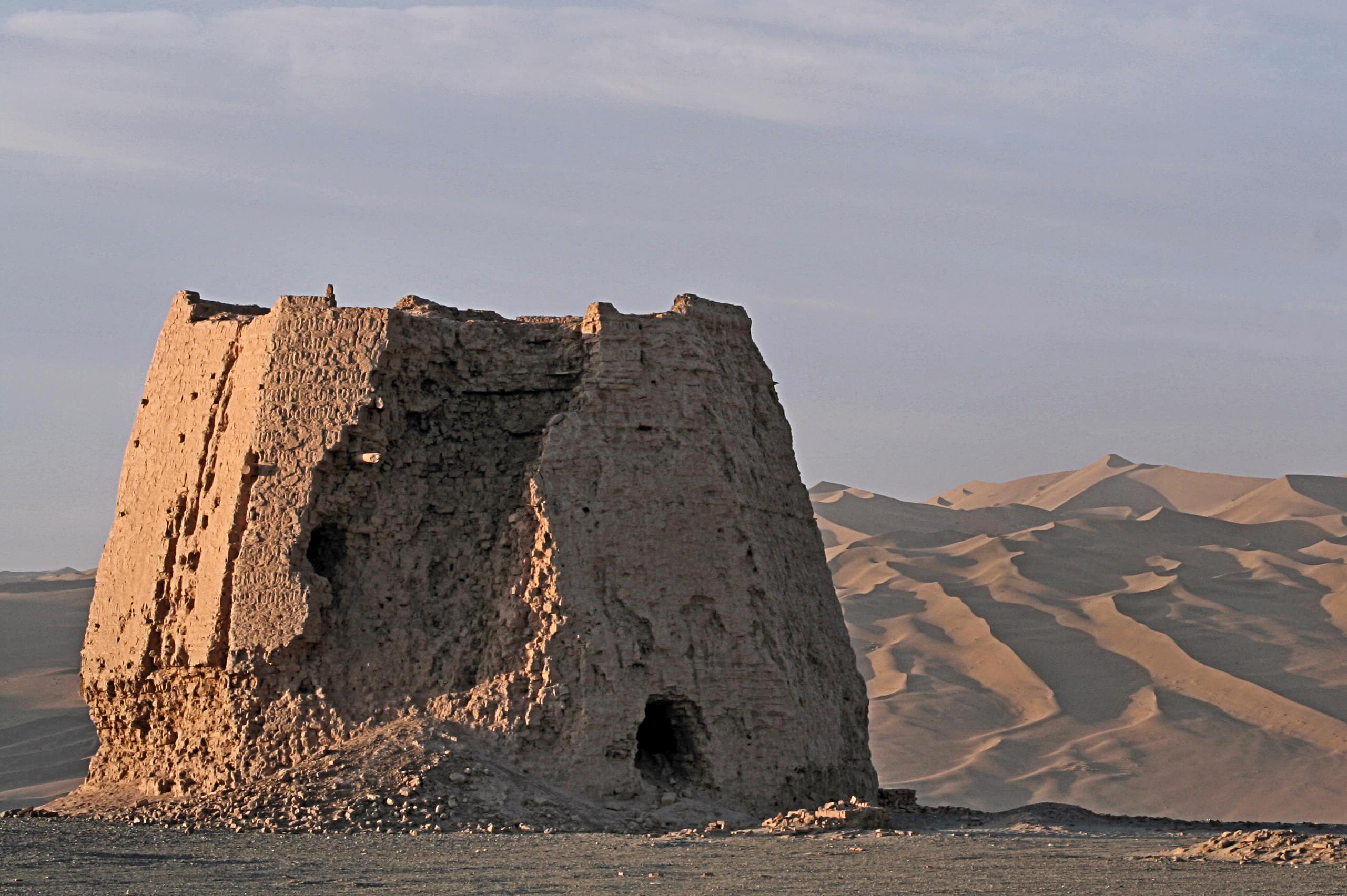
Han dynasty watchtower near Dunhuang, Gansu, China

Some notable examples of military Mediterranean watchtowers include the towers that the Knights of Malta had constructed on the coasts of Malta. These towers ranged in size from small watchtowers to large structures armed with numerous cannons. They include the Wignacourt, de Redin, and Lascaris towers, named for the Grand Master, such as Martin de Redin, that commissioned each series.

The name of Tunisia's second biggest city, Sfax, is the berber-punic translation from the greek "Taphroúria" (Ταφρούρια) meaning watchtower, which may mean that the 9th century Muslim town was built as an extension of what is currently known as the Kasbah, one of the corners of the surviving complete rampart of the medina.

In the Channel Islands, the Jersey Round Towers and the Guernsey loophole towers date from the late 18th century. They were erected to give warning of attacks by the French.

The Martello towers that the British built in the UK and elsewhere in the British Empire were defensive fortifications that were armed with cannon and that were often within line of sight of each other. One of the last Martello towers to be built was Fort Denison in Sydney harbour. The most recent descendants of the Martello Towers are the flak towers that the various combatants erected in World War II as mounts for anti-aircraft artillery.

=== Modern warfare ===
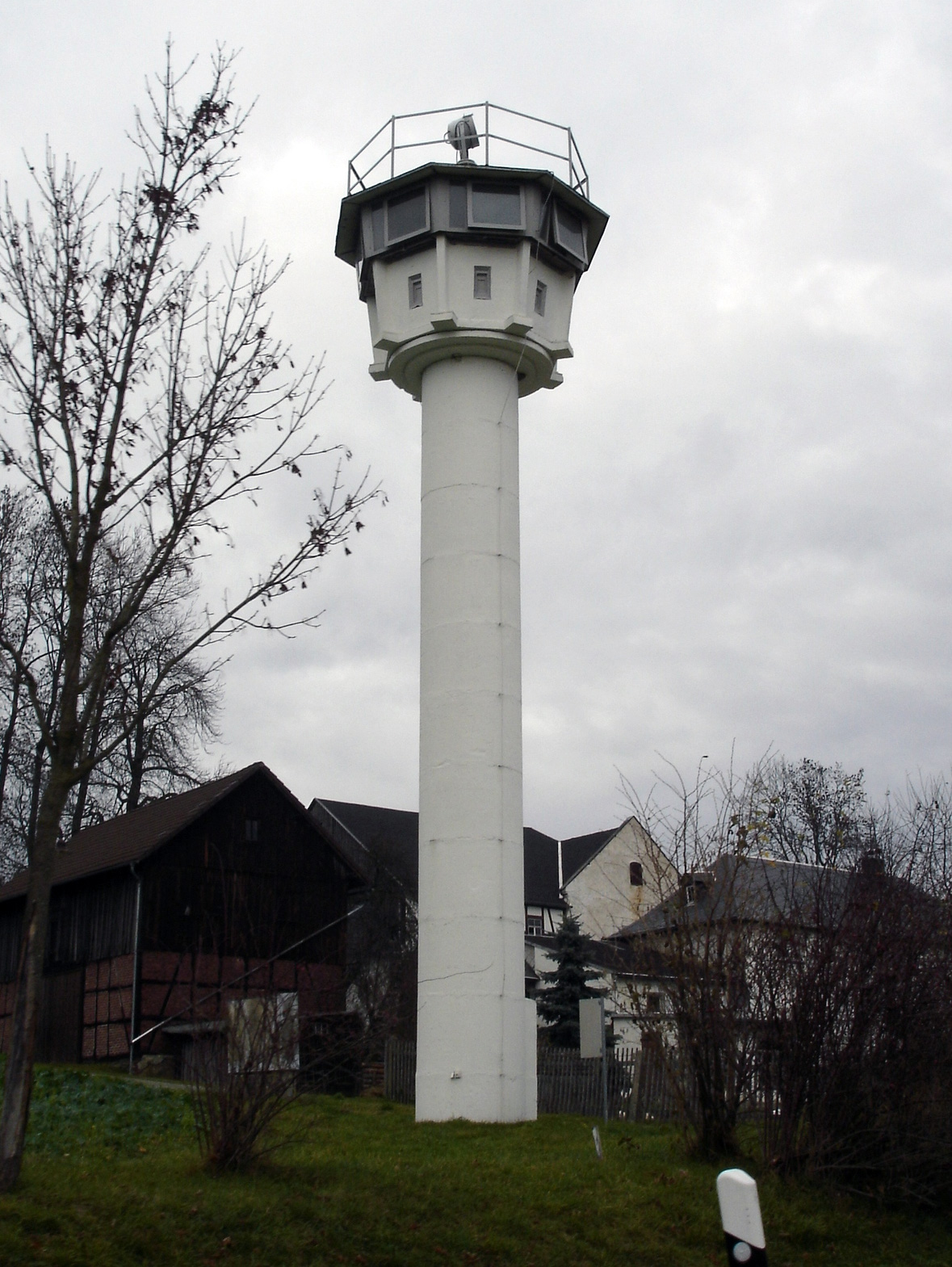
A modern example of a military watchtower. The example shown is a BT-11 found along the former Inner German Border between East and West Germany.

In modern warfare the relevance of watchtowers has decreased due to the availability of alternative forms of military intelligence, such as reconnaissance by spy satellites and unmanned aerial vehicles. However watch towers have been used in counter-insurgency wars to maintain a military presence in conflict areas in case such as by the French Army in French Indochina, by the British Army and the RUC in Northern Ireland and the IDF in Gaza and West Bank.

=== Non-military watchtowers ===
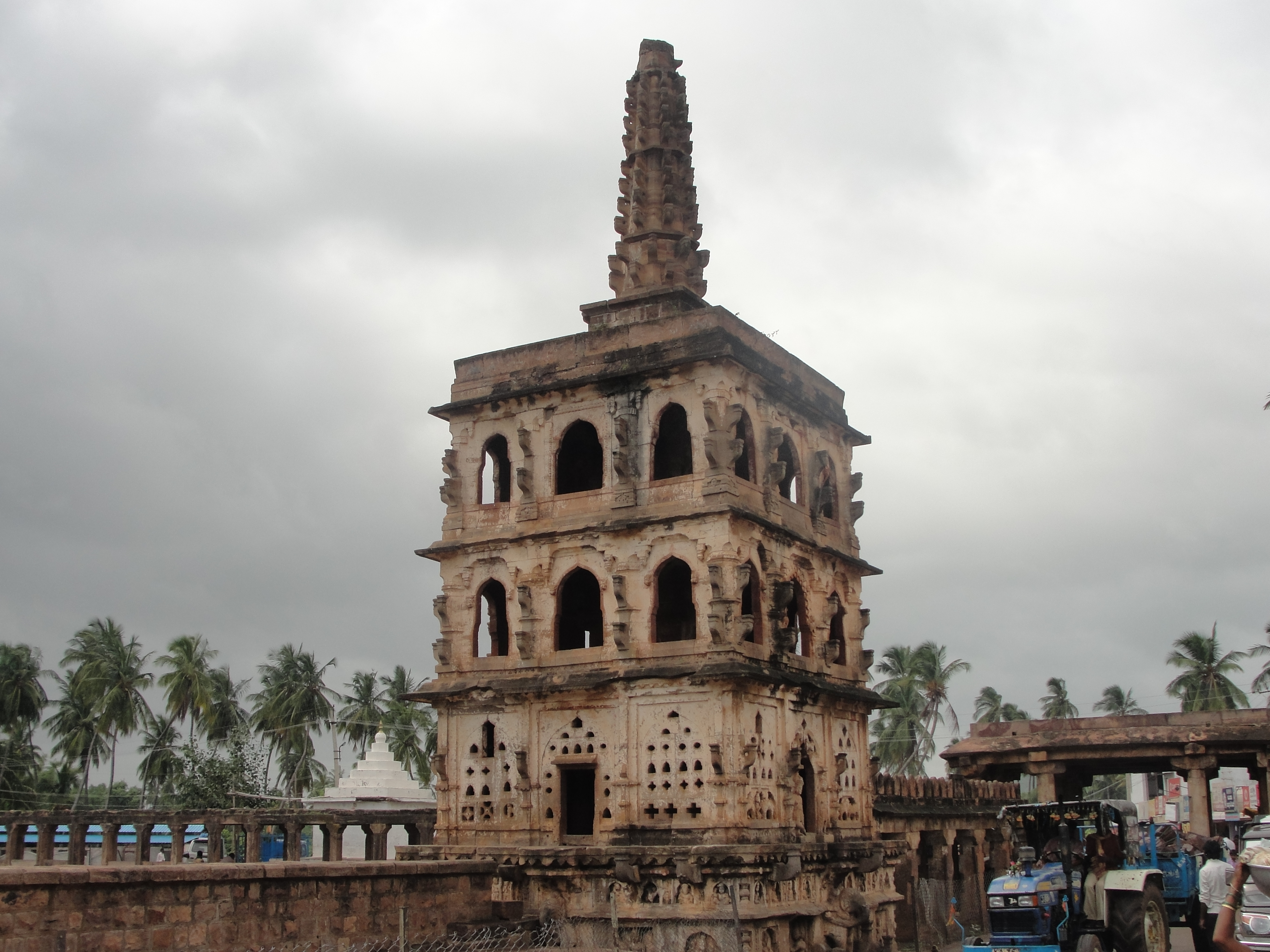
Non-military watchtower, used as a lamp post to illuminate during the night, at Banashankari temple, Karnataka, India

An example of the non-military watchtower in history is the one of Jerusalem. Though the Hebrews used it to keep a watch for approaching armies, the religious authorities forbade the taking of weapons up into the tower as this would require bringing weapons through the temple. Rebuilt by King Herod, that Watchtower was renamed after Mark Antony, his friend who battled against Gaius Julius Caesar Octavianus (later Augustus) and lost.

== Notable guard towers ==
- Alcatraz guard towers
- Auschwitz II guard towers
- Tower of London
- Yuma Territorial Prison 1876 guard tower.

== Gallery ==
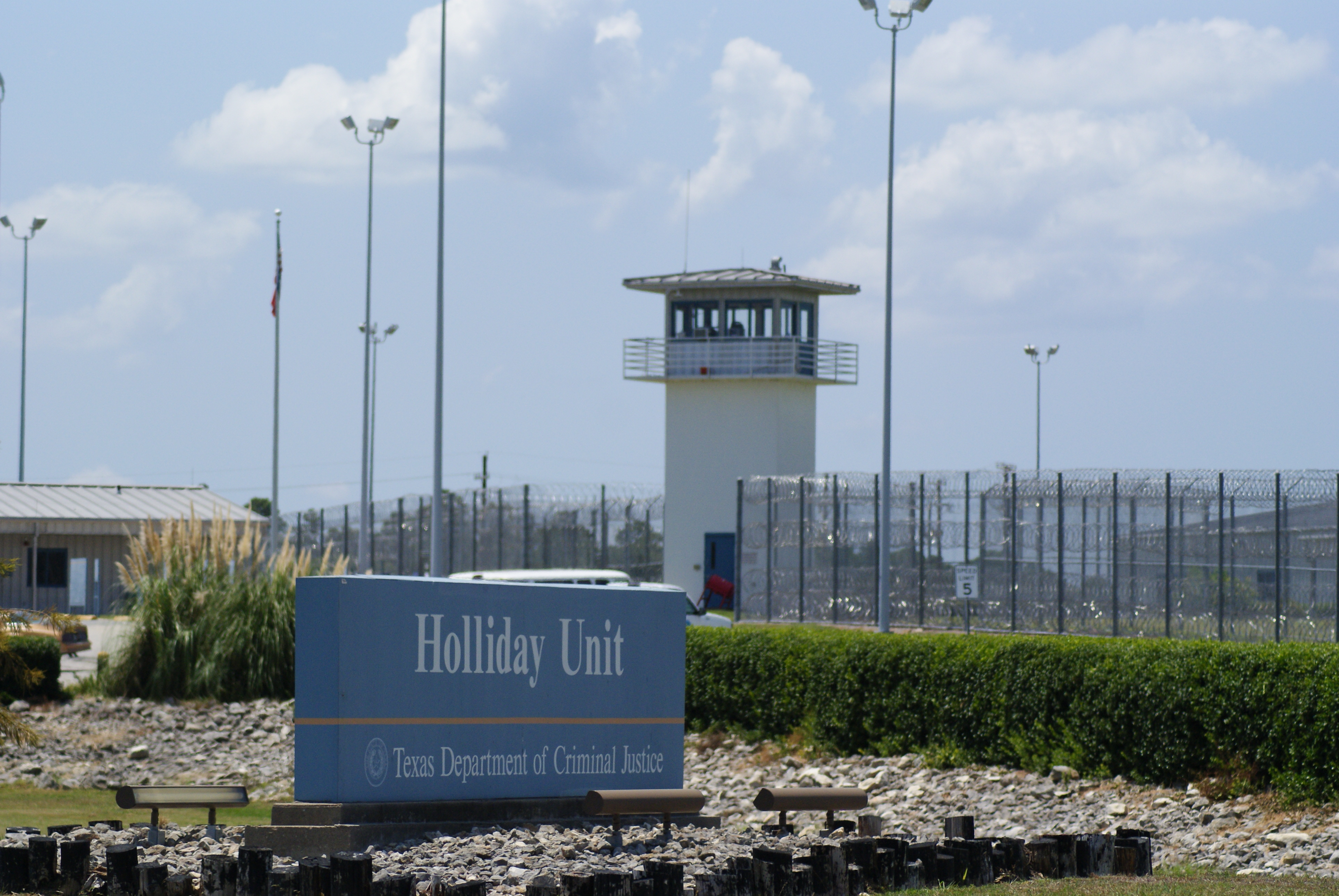
A guard tower at the C.A. Holliday Unit of a state prison in Huntsville, Texas

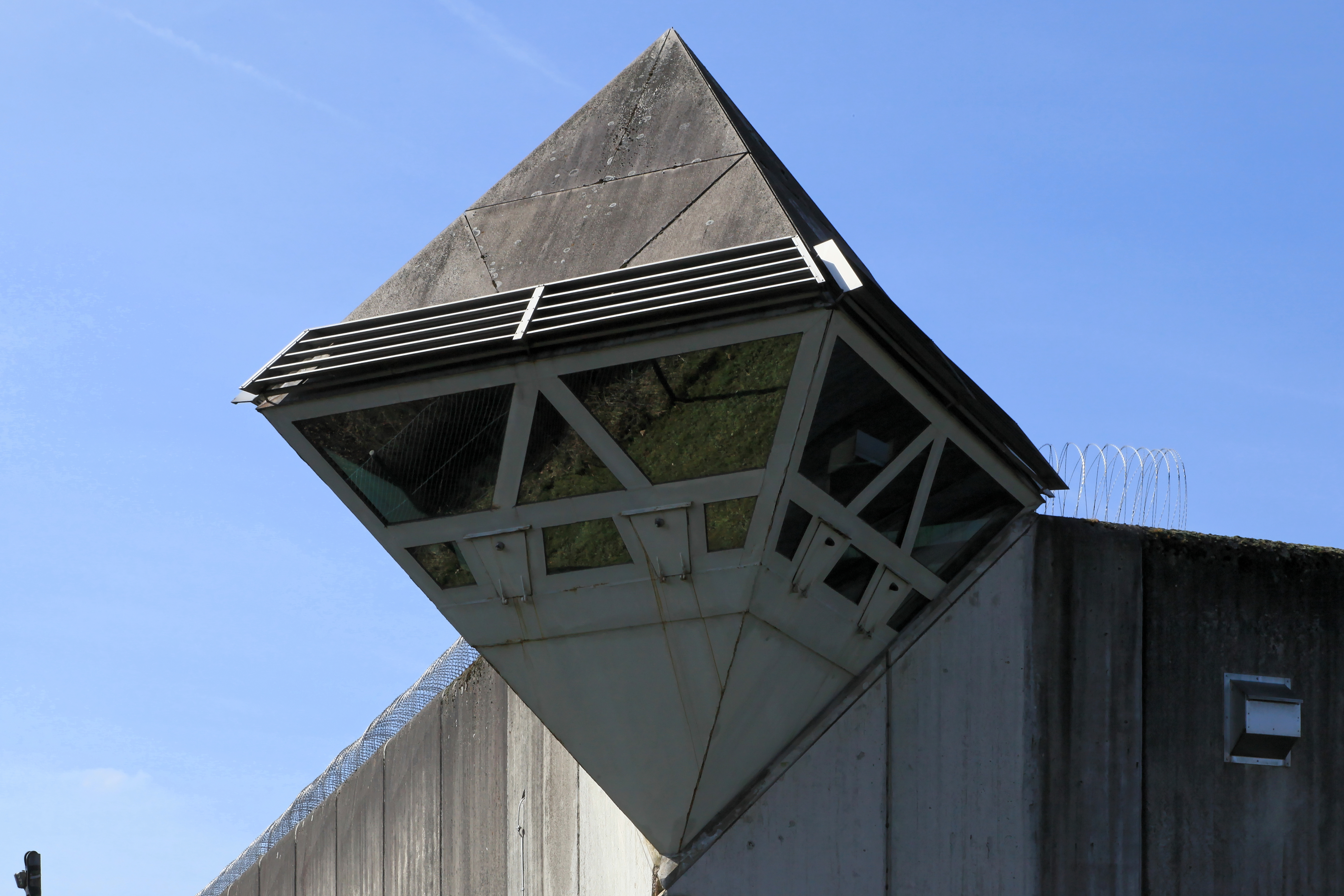
Modern prison guard tower

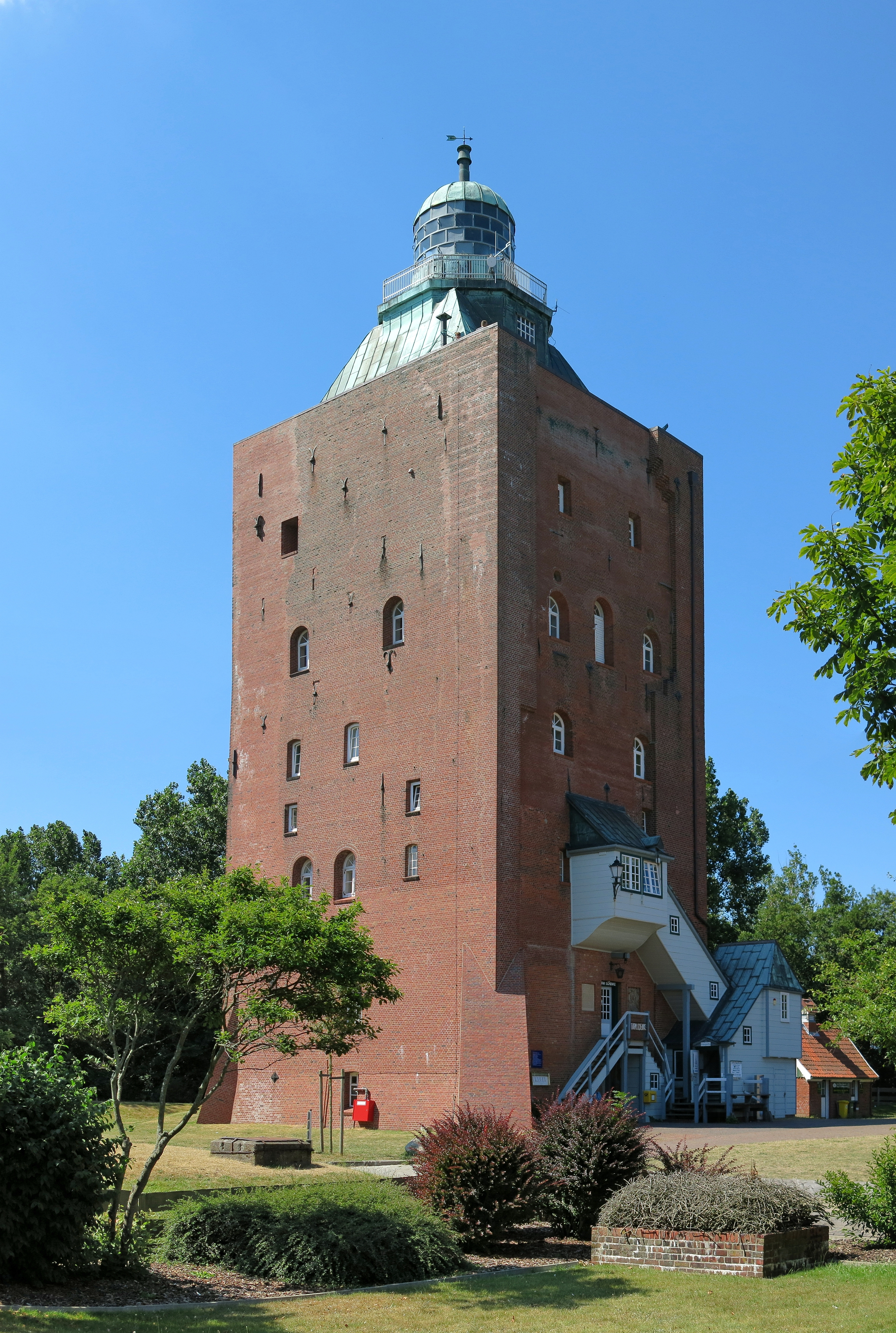
Great Tower Neuwerk built 1310 by Hamburg, Germany

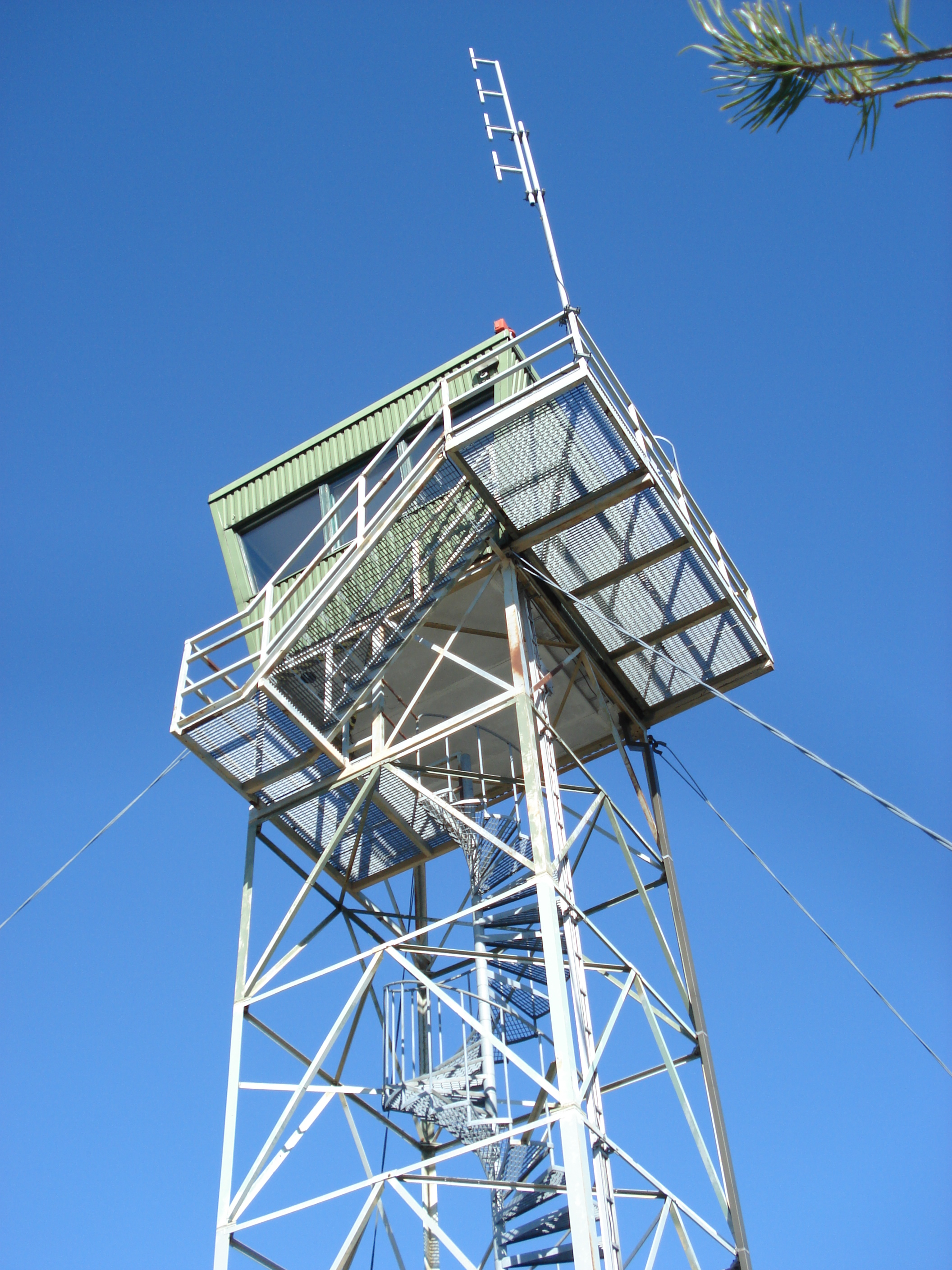
Susiluoto Coast Guard Station watch tower in Kustavi, Finland

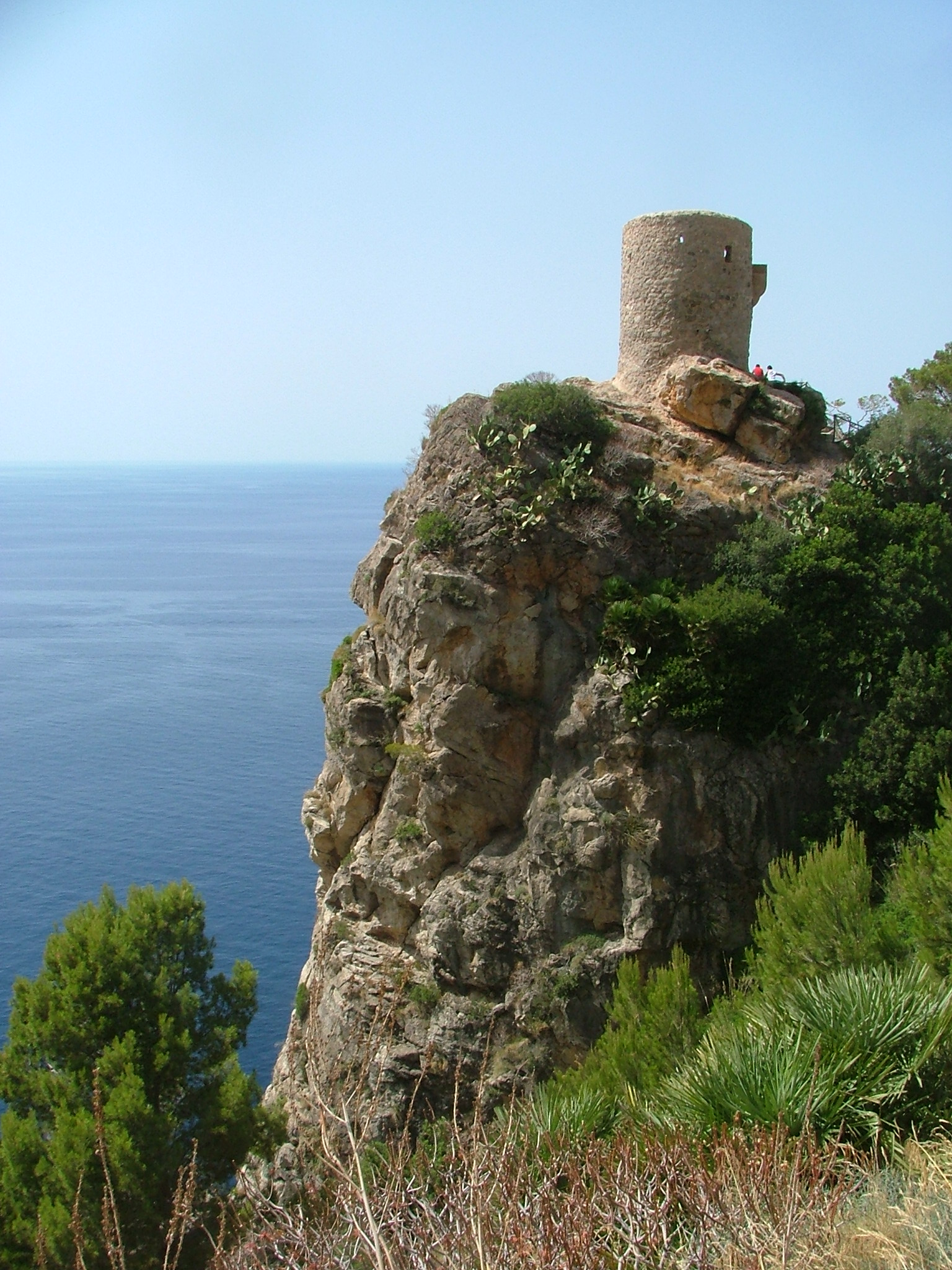
Torre del Verger, guard tower located at Banyalbufar, Mallorca, Spain

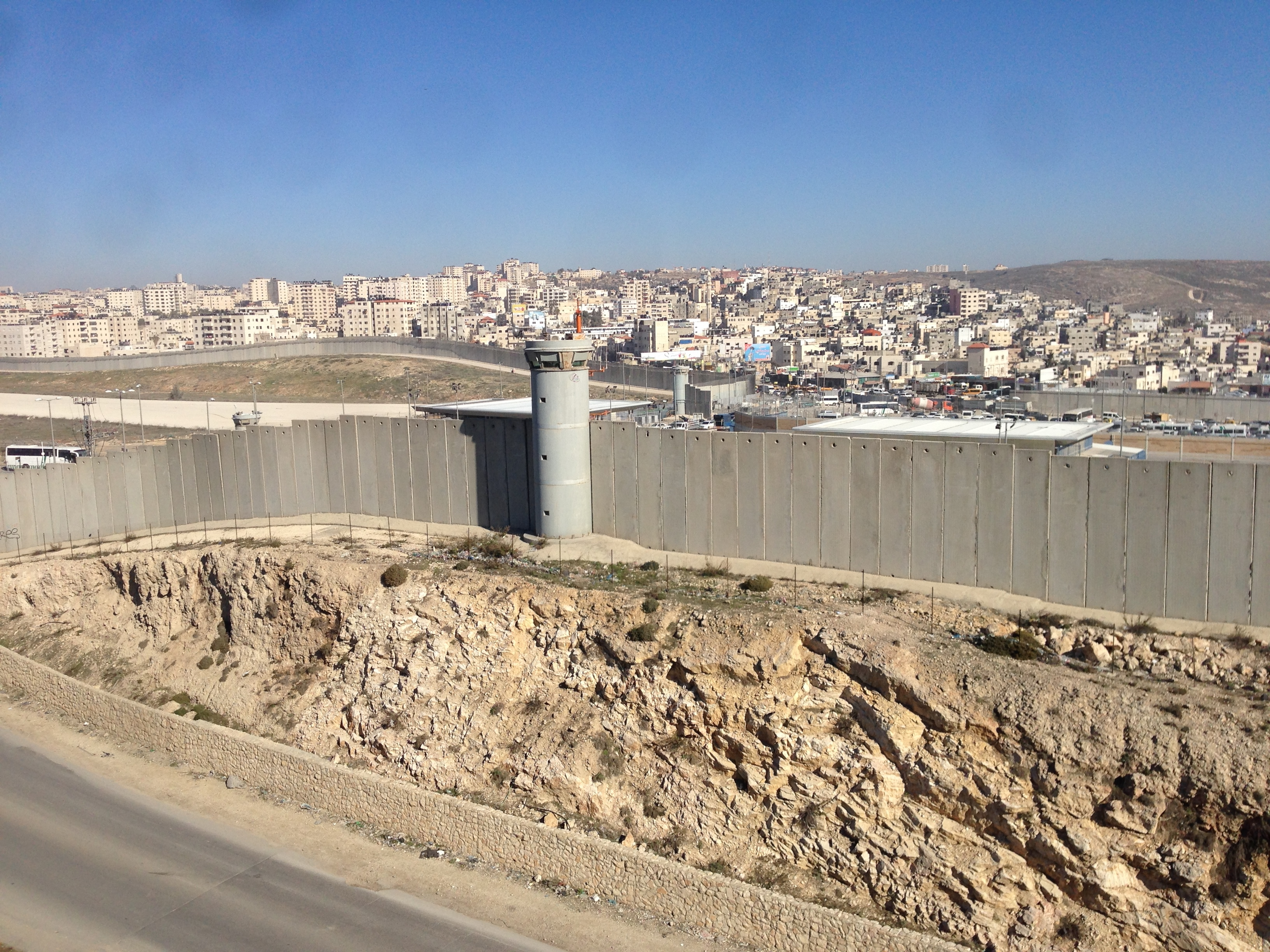
Israeli watchtowers and wall at the checkpoint of the Palestinian refugee camp of Qalandia, 2014

== See also ==
- Blockhouse
- Diaolou
- Fire lookout tower
- Guardhouse
