= James H. Byrd Jr. Unit =

Prison in Huntsville, Texas

James "Jay" H. Byrd Unit
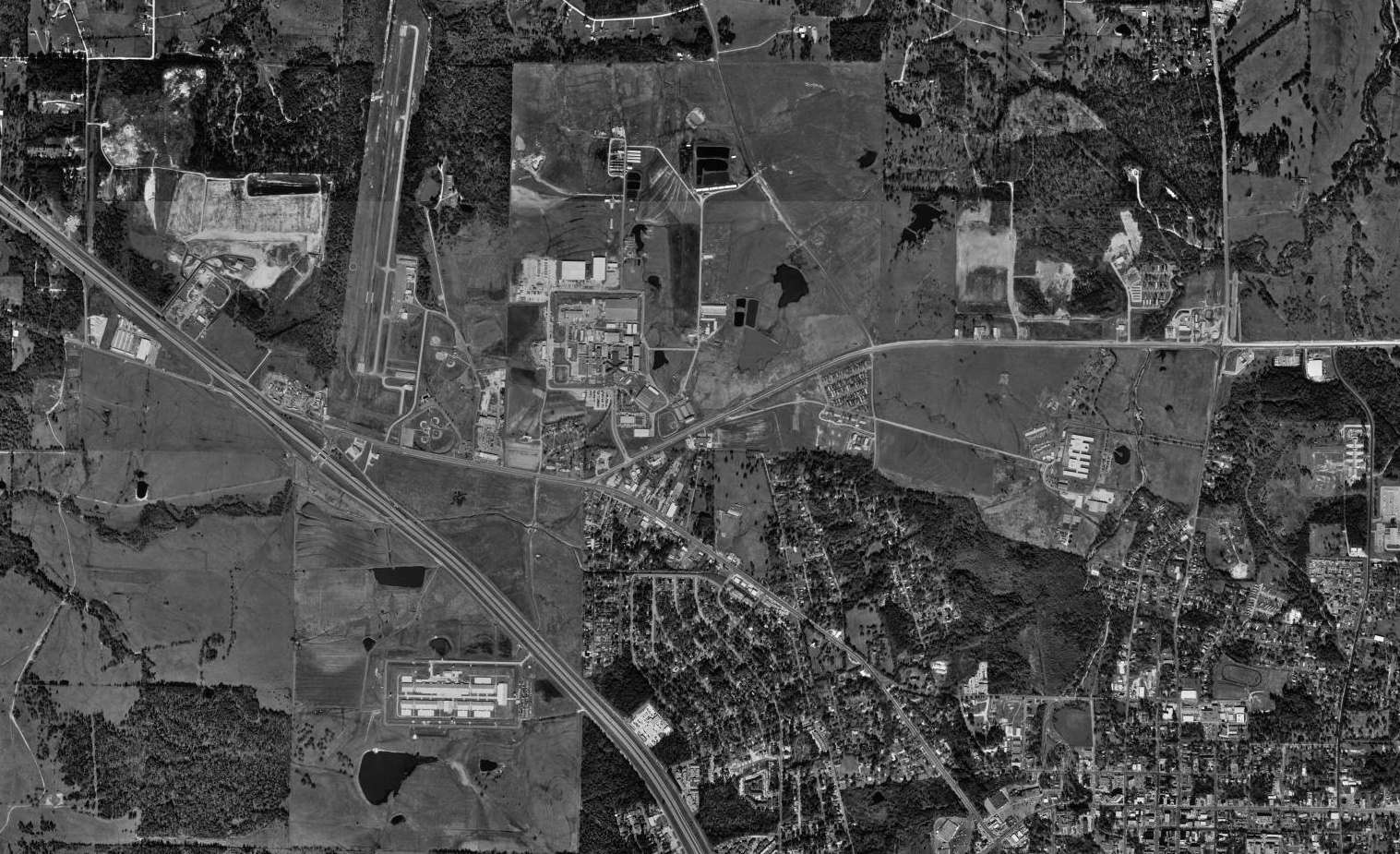
- Aerial photograph of the Byrd, Holliday, and Wynne units, and the Huntsville Municipal Airport - U.S. Geological Survey - January 23, 1995

- Location in Texas
- Location: 21 FM 247 Huntsville, Texas 77320; 30.7374333°N 095.5556000°W
- Status: Operational
- Security class: G1, G2, Transient
- Capacity: 1,365
- Opened: May 1964
- Managed by: TDCJ Correctional Institutions Division
- Warden: Tallan Metcalf
- Website: www.tdcj.state.tx.us/unit_directory../du.html

The James "Jay" H. Byrd Jr. Unit (DU) is a Texas Department of Criminal Justice prison for men located in Huntsville, Texas. The 93 acres (38 ha) diagnostic unit, established in May 1964, is 1 mile (1.6 km) north of Downtown Huntsville on Farm to Market Road 247. The prison was named after James H. Byrd, a former prison warden.

The facility is the TDCJ's primary prisoner intake facility in Huntsville. All male death row offenders and male offenders with life imprisonment without parole enter the TDCJ system through Byrd. From there, the inmates with life without parole sentences go on to their assigned facilities. Male death row offenders go on to the Allan B. Polunsky Unit.
