= Bridgeport Unit =

Prison in Bridgeport, Texas, United States

Coordinates: 33°14′10″N 97°45′29″W

Bridgeport Unit (Bridgeport Correctional Center)
- Interactive map of Bridgeport Unit (Bridgeport Correctional Center)
- Location: 4000 North 10th Street Bridgeport, Texas
- Status: open
- Security class: G1, G2
- Capacity: 520
- Opened: August 1989
- Managed by: Texas Department of Criminal Justice

See also Bridgeport Correctional Center, Bridgeport, Connecticut

The Bridgeport Unit (or Bridgeport Correctional Center) is a state prison for men located in Bridgeport, Wise County, Texas, which is operated by the Texas Department of Criminal Justice.

This facility was opened in August 1989, and a maximum capacity of 520 male inmates. From 1989 through 2010 the prison was operated by the GEO Group.
