= Wynne Unit =

American prison

John M. Wynne Unit
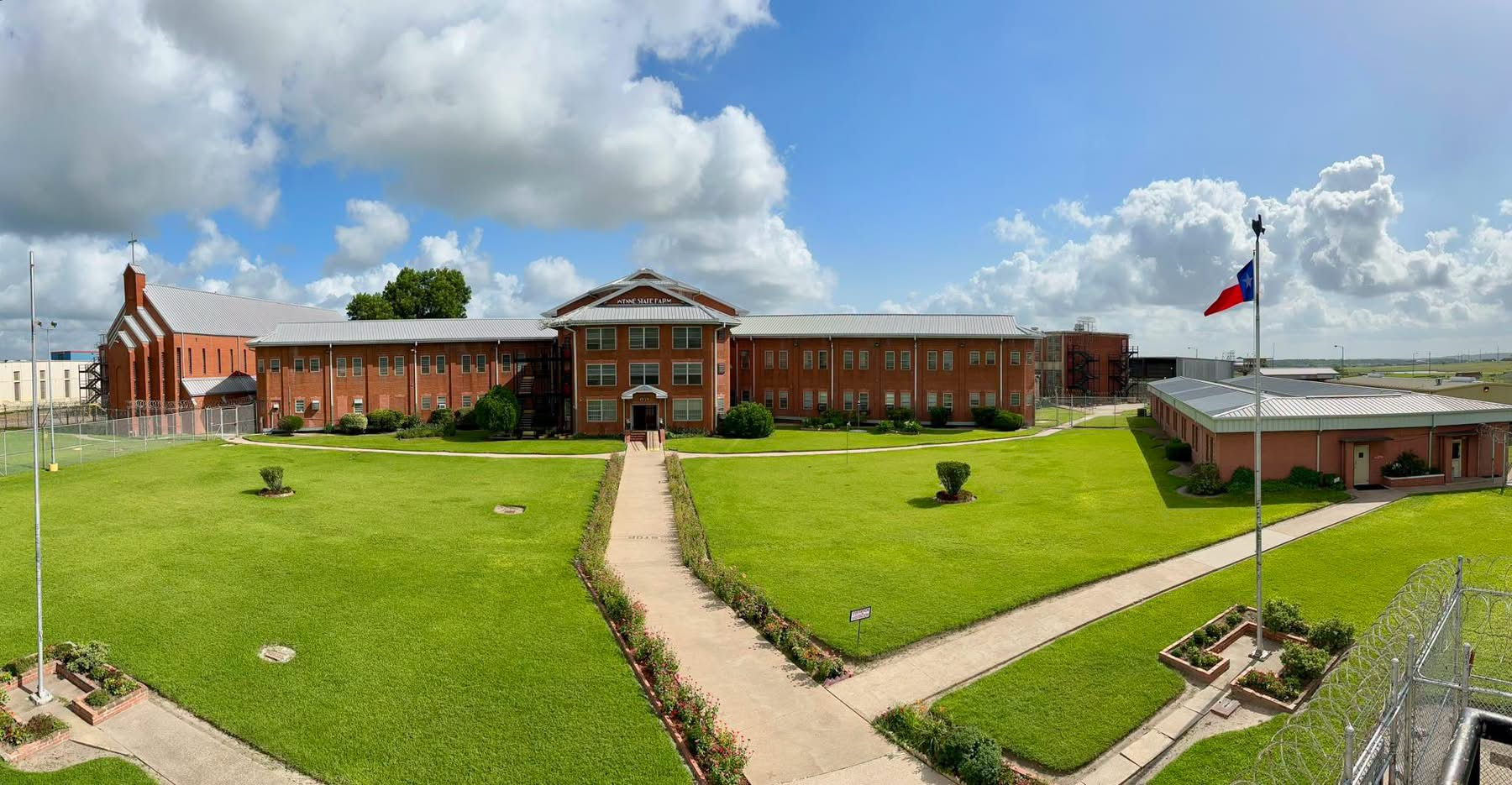

- Location in Texas
- Location: 810 FM 2821 Huntsville, Texas 77349; 30°44′29″N 95°34′38″W
- Status: Operational
- Security class: G1-G5, Outside Trusty
- Capacity: Unit: 2,300 Trusty Camp: 321
- Opened: 1883
- Managed by: TDCJ Correctional Institutions Division
- Warden: Brian Smith
- Website: www.tdcj.state.tx.us/unit_directory/wy.html

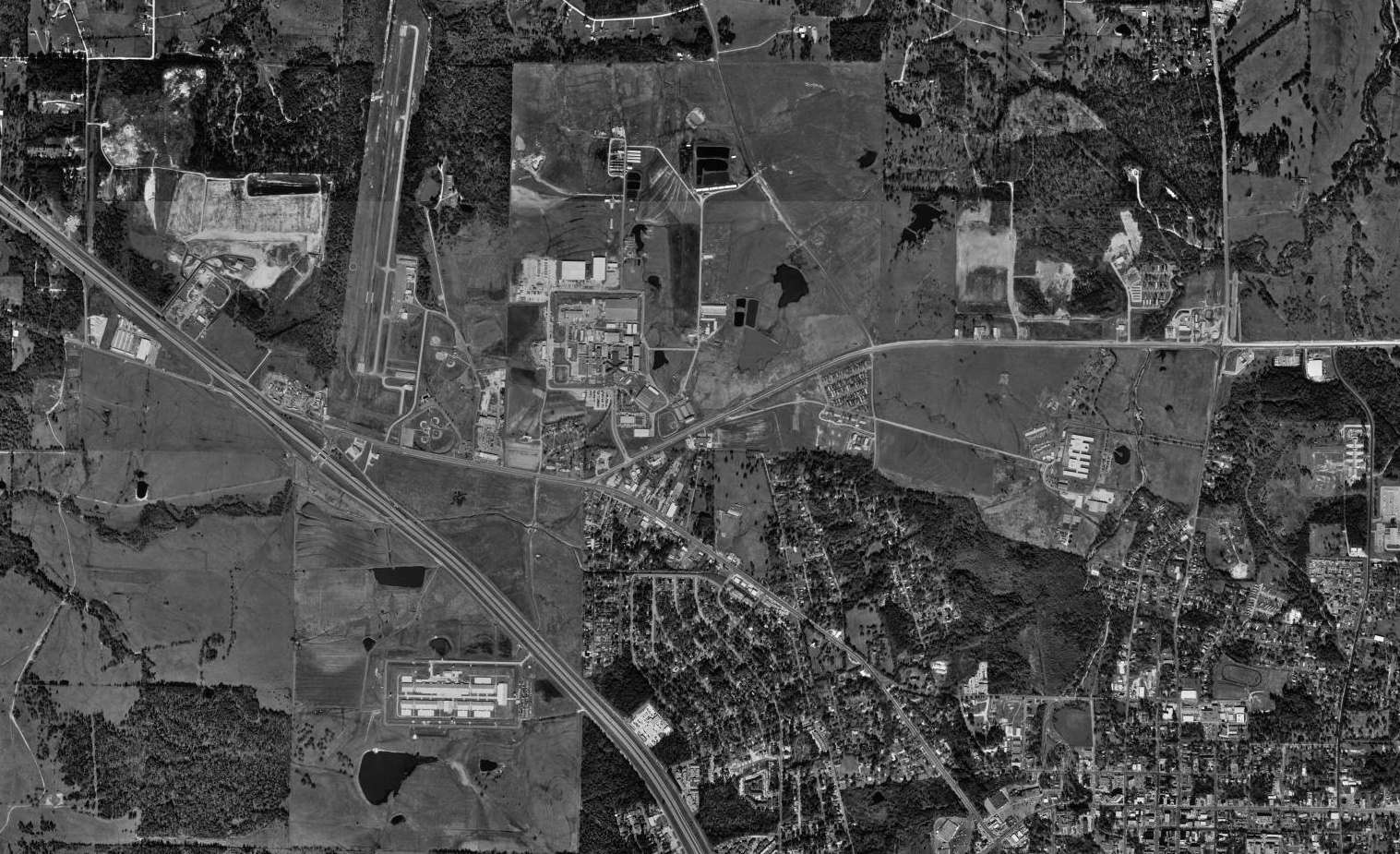
Aerial photograph of the Wynne, Holliday, and Byrd units, and the Huntsville Municipal Airport - U.S. Geological Survey - January 23, 1995

The John M. Wynne Unit (WY) is an American men's prison of the Texas Department of Criminal Justice, located in northern Huntsville, Texas, at the intersection of Farm to Market Road 2821 West and Texas State Highway 75 North. The Windham School District has its headquarters in the unit. Wynne, the second oldest prison in Texas, was named after John Magruder Wynne, who served as a prison employee and later as a board member of the prison system from 1878 to 1881. The unit, on a 1,412 acres (571 ha) plot of land, is co-located with the Holliday Unit.

== History ==
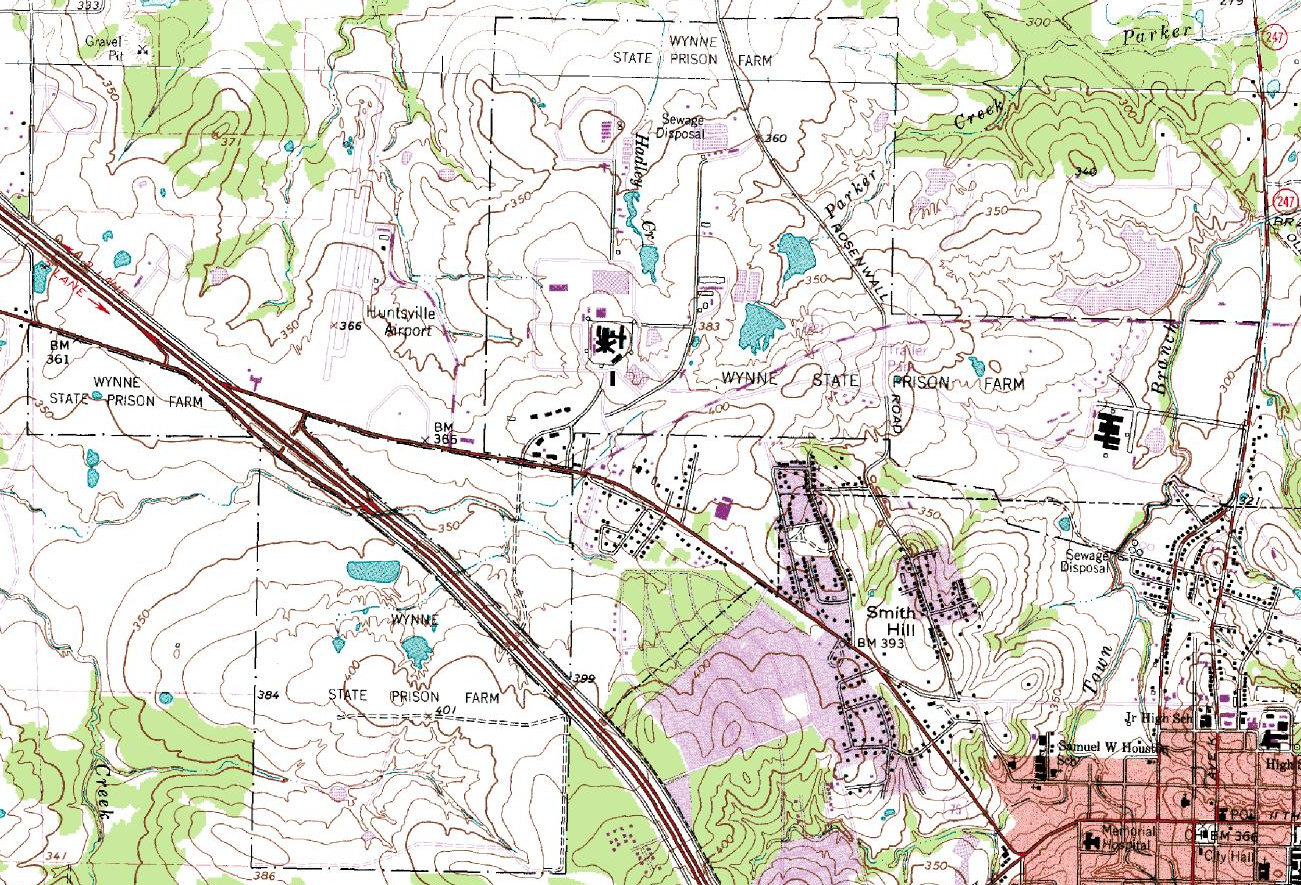
Topographical map of the Wynne Unit - U.S. Geological Survey - July 1, 1976

The State of Texas bought Wynne from the last lessees of the facility (Cunningham and Ellis) in 1883. Wynne initially had about 1,970 acres (800 ha) of terrace gardens used to fulfill the gardening needs of the Huntsville Unit. The current unit was dedicated in 1937 and completed in 1939.

In the 1970s, the prison had 17 prison guards in its day shift to oversee 2,600 prisoners. The prison system arranged to have building tenders used to guard the prisoners, making up for the small number of prison guards.

On August 8, 2000, an inmate escaped from the prison by driving a tractor trailer cab through the prison wall while avoiding gunshots fired by correctional officers. The prisoner left the truck on the runway of Huntsville Airport and fled into a vehicle; state officials believed that the man's wife drove the vehicle. Police officers with tracking dogs found the man and his wife under a tree less than 7 miles (11 km) from the Wynne Unit. The state said that the offender "reportedly" was taken with force, while the wife surrendered peacefully.

In 2007 two inmates from Wynne escaped. During the incident the escape vehicle hit 59-year-old correctional officer Susan Canfield, killing her. Both inmates have been found and rearrested. The driver, Jerry Duane Martin (TDCJ#999552), was executed on December 3, 2013. The other inmate, John Ray Falk was sentenced to death in 2017. At the time of the escape, Falk was serving a life sentence for the 1986 murder of Donald Owen in Matagorda County. Martin, on the other hand, was serving a 50 year sentence for a 1994 shooting incident in which he attempted to murder several police officers in Collin County, none of whom were physically injured.

In 2008 an Offender escaped the Wynne Unit using a child's bicycle. He was taken back into custody less than 24 hours later.

== Operations ==
Wynne has a computer recovery factory, and a license plate factory (the only one for the state and works with the 3M company). A mattress factory, which provides all of the beds for the state colleges, is at the Wynne Unit, as well as a mechanic shop with diesel repair, a signs and plastics plant, and a Graphics facility. All of the state issued car registration stickers are also made at the Wynne Unit. It has been shown that the Wynne Unit generates around $1 Million a week for the State of Texas. The Windham School District has its headquarters in Building B in the Wynne Unit.

== Notable inmates ==
Inmate Name	Register Number	Status	Details
Efrain Pérez	05123668 / 01306199	Serving a life sentence. Eligible for parole in 2029.	One of six perpetrators of the 1993 Murders of Jennifer Ertman and Elizabeth Peña in which the two girls were brutally gang raped and tortured before being killed. Perez was originally given a death sentence.

- David Ruiz (plaintiff of Ruiz v. Estelle)
- Fred Cruz (Petitioner Prisoner in Cruz v. Beto)
- David Crosby (member of Crosby, Stills, and Nash) was held for 5 months in the Wynne State Farm. "http://www.rockandrollroadmap.com/other-u.s.-area-misc/wynne-unit-david-crosby-imprisoned-here/view-details.html"
- Michael Morton - Later exonerated of the crime he was accused of.
- Keith Robert Turner - perpetrator of the 2006 Harris County, Texas hate crime assault
