= Jim Rudd =

American politician

Jimmy Dean "Jim" Rudd

Texas State Representative for District 77 (Andrews, Cochran, Dawson, Gaines, Hockley, Martin, Terry, and Yoakum counties)
- In office 1977–1993
- Preceded by: E L Short
- Succeeded by: Paul C. Moreno

Texas State Representative from District 80 (Andrews, Dawson, Gaines, Hockley, Loving, Martin, Reeves, Terry, Winkler, and Yoakum counties)
- In office 1993–1995
- Preceded by: Charles Finnell
- Succeeded by: Gary Walker

Personal details
- Born: 16 February 1943 (age 83) Place of birth missing
- Party: Democratic
- Occupation: Lawyer; Lobbyist

Jimmy Dean Rudd (born c. 1943), known as Jim Rudd, is an attorney and a Democratic former member of the Texas House of Representatives from Brownfield in Terry County in West Texas. He held the District 77 seat from 1977 to 1993. For his last term from 1993 to 1995, he represented District 80.

After he left the state House, Rudd became a lobbyist in the capital city of Austin, Texas. The Jim D. Rudd Transfer Facility, a unit of the Texas Department of Corrections, located on the Lamesa Highway in Brownfield is named in his honor.

Texas House of Representatives
Preceded by E L Short	Member of the Texas House of Representatives from District 77 (Brownfield); 1977–1993	Succeeded by Paul C. Moreno
Preceded by Charles Finnell	Member of the Texas House of Representatives from District 80 (Brownfield); 1993–1995	Succeeded by Gary Walker
Political offices
