= North Texas Intermediate Sanction Facility =

Former prison in Texas, United States

Coordinates: 32°52′20″N 97°20′28″W

The North Texas Intermediate Sanction Facility (NTISF (GEO Group acronym) or XL (TDCJ acronym)) was a privately operated prison facility located in northern Fort Worth, Texas. It was operated by the GEO Group on behalf of the Texas Department of Criminal Justice. The facility was on the east side of Blue Mound Road, about 1 mile (1.6 km) south of Interstate 820 and north of Downtown Fort Worth.

The GEO Group was awarded the contract to operate the center on August 16, 1991. The center opened in August 1991. The facility housed short term parole violators.

The facility, with capacity to house 432 prisoners, had about 100 employees. Prisoners typically stayed for 60 to 100 days. The longest incarceration was for six months. In 2011 GEO stated that it wanted to continue to operate the facility. In 2011 the state of Texas decided not to renew its contract with the facility.
