= Price Daniel Unit =

Prison in Texas, United States

Coordinates: 32°43′15″N 100°49′03″W

- Interactive map of Price Daniel Unit
- Location: 938 FM 1673 Snyder, Texas
- Status: open
- Security class: G1, G2, G4, Safekeeping
- Capacity: 1384
- Opened: August 1989
- Managed by: Texas Department of Criminal Justice

The Price Daniel Unit is a state prison for men located in unincorporated Scurry County, Texas, near Snyder, owned by operated by the Texas Department of Criminal Justice. This facility was opened in August 1989, and a maximum capacity of 1384 male inmates held at various security levels.
