= Jim Rudd Unit =

Prison in Texas, USA

Coordinates: 33°09′29″N 102°16′51″W

- Interactive map of Jim Rudd Unit
- Location: 2004 Lamesa Highway Brownfield, Texas
- Status: open
- Security class: G1, G2
- Capacity: 612
- Opened: March 1995
- Managed by: Texas Department of Criminal Justice

The Jim Rudd Unit a.k.a. the Jim Rudd Transfer Facility is a state prison for men located in Brownfield, Terry County, Texas, owned and operated by the Texas Department of Criminal Justice. This facility was opened in March 1995, and a maximum capacity of 612 male inmates held at various security levels.

The prison was named for Texas political figure Jim Rudd.
