= Bartlett State Jail =

Prison in Texas, United States

Coordinates: 30°47′40″N 97°26′34″W

Bartlett Innovation Unit
- Interactive map of Bartlett Innovation Unit
- Location: Bartlett, Texas
- Status: Medium and minimum security
- Capacity: 1049
- Opened: 1995; reopened 2024
- Closed: 2017
- Managed by: Corrections Corporation of America

The Bartlett State Jail was a privately operated minimum- and medium-security prison for men located in Bartlett, Williamson County, Texas. The facility was operated by Corrections Corporation of America under contract with the Texas Department of Criminal Justice and housed state inmates.

CCA ran the facility from 1995 to 2017. It had an official capacity of 1049 inmates.

A sexual assault lawsuit filed against CCA for a "hazing" incident in October 2013 alleged, among other things, that the facility was deliberately understaffed to cut costs.

The facility was closed in 2017 due to declining inmate populations in the state of Texas.

In October 2024 the Texas Department of Criminal Justice reopened the facility.
