= Lindsey State Jail =

Men's prison in Jacksboro, Texas, United States

Coordinates: 33°14′50″N 98°09′19″W

- Interactive map of Lindsey State Jail
- Location: 1620 FM 3344 Jacksboro, Texas
- Status: medium and minimum
- Capacity: 1031
- Opened: 1995; operated by Texas Department of Criminal Justice since 2025
- Managed by: Texas Department of Criminal Justice

The Lindsey State Jail (formally the John R Lindsey State Jail) is a minimum- and medium-security prison for men located in Jacksboro, Jack County, Texas. The facility is operated by the Texas Department of Criminal Justice and houses state inmates.

Texas Department of Criminal Justice has run the facility since 2025, and it has an official capacity of 1031 inmates.
