= Coleman Unit =

Prison in Lockhart, Texas, U.S.

Coordinates: 29°52′13″N 97°39′10″W

Gregory S. Coleman Unit
- Interactive map of Gregory S. Coleman Unit
- Location: 1400 E Martin Luther King Jr Industrial Blvd Lockhart, Texas
- Status: open
- Security class: G1, G2
- Capacity: 1000
- Opened: January 1993
- Managed by: Texas Department of Criminal Justice

The Gregory S. Coleman Unit, formerly known as the Lockhart Unit, is a state prison for women located in Lockhart, Caldwell County, Texas, operated (as of September 2025) by the Texas Department of Criminal Justice.

Lockhart was previously operated by the GEO Group. This facility was opened in January 1993, and has a maximum capacity of 1000 female inmates held at lower security levels.

In 2021, the unit was renamed the Gregory S. Coleman Unit to honor a former member of the Texas Board of Criminal Justice.
