= C. A. Holliday Transfer Facility =

Prison in Texas, United States

Coordinates: 30°43′39″N 95°35′00″W

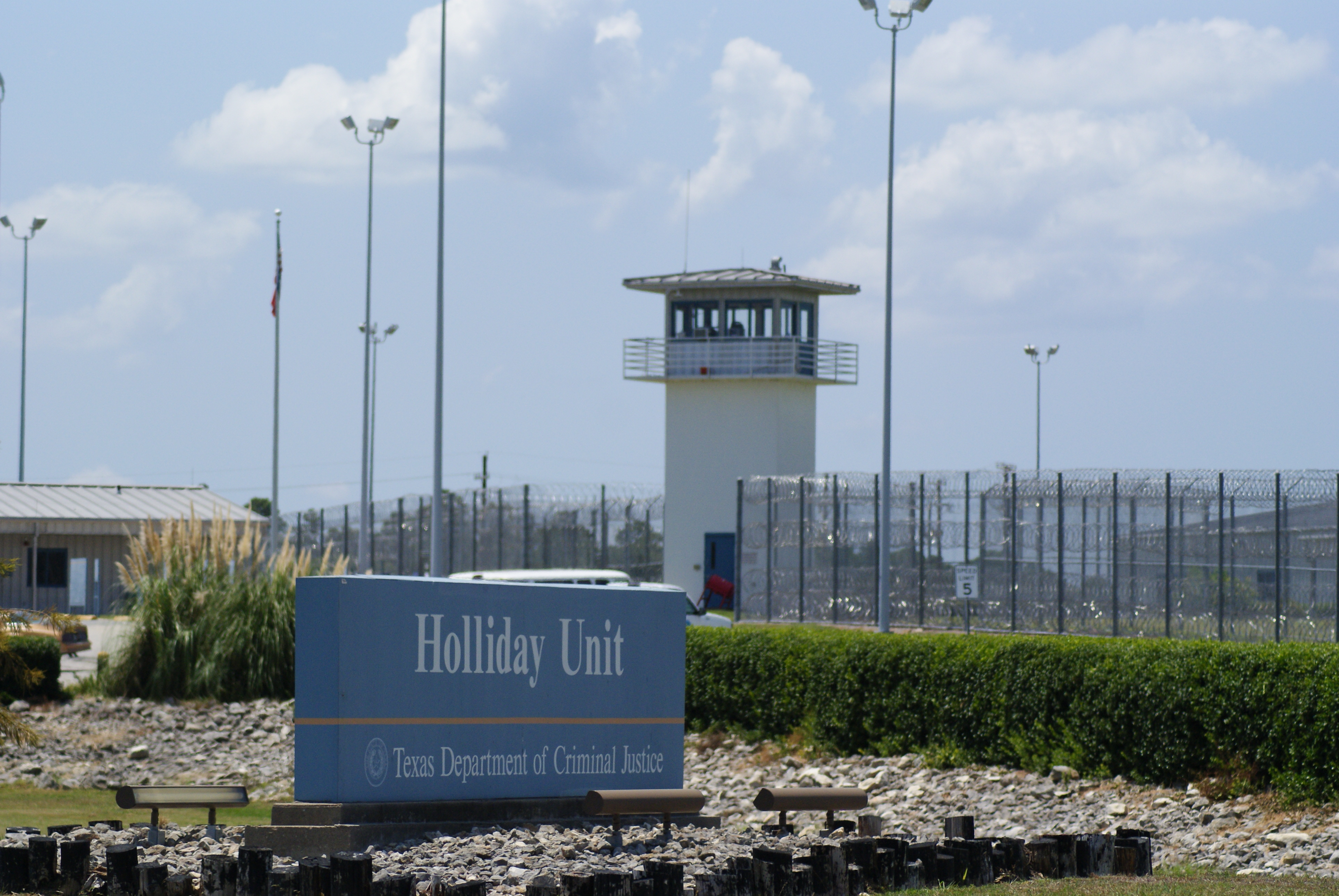
Holliday Unit in Huntsville Texas

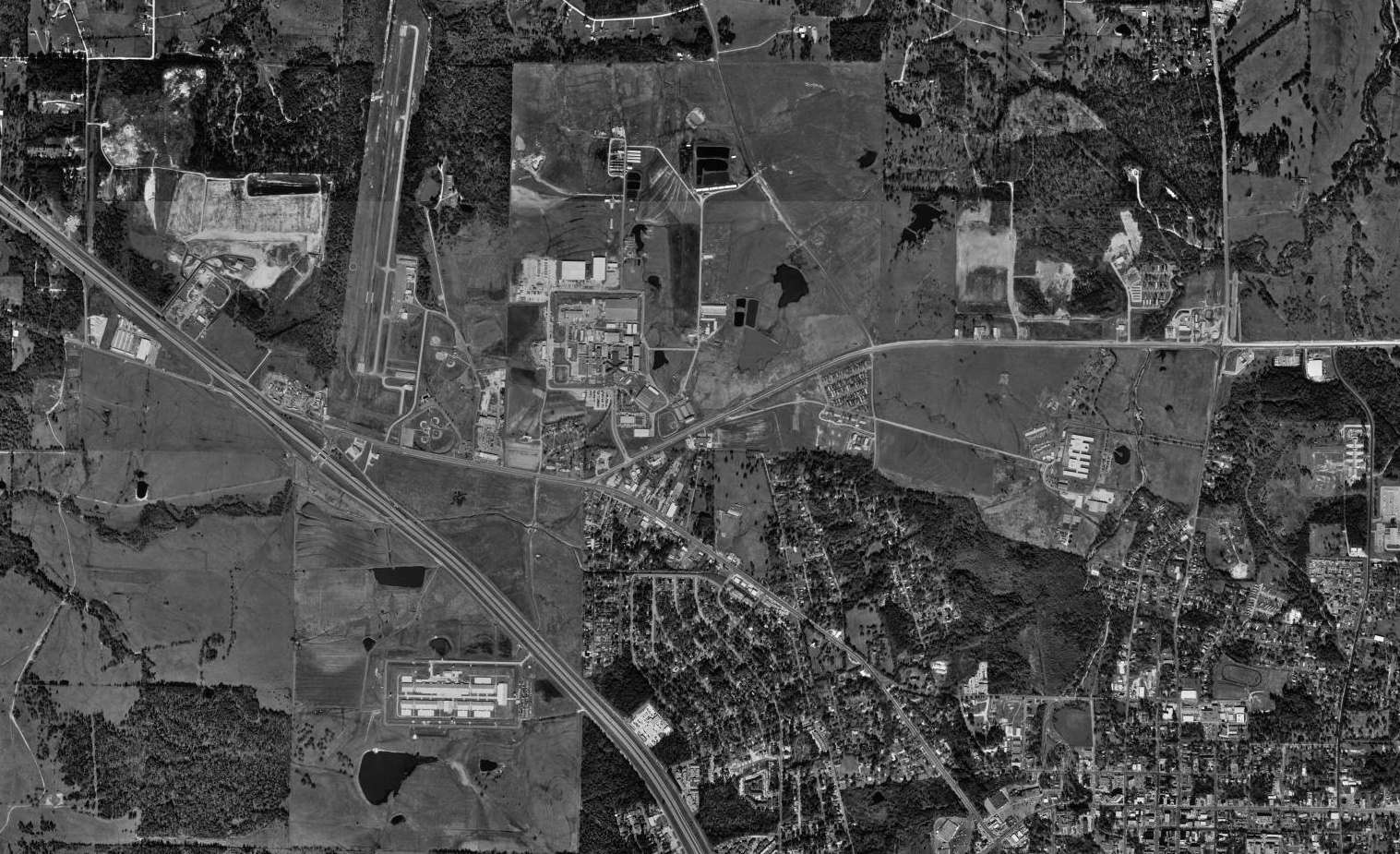
Aerial photograph of the Holliday, Wynne, and Byrd units, and the Huntsville Municipal Airport - U.S. Geological Survey - January 23, 1995

The Holliday Transfer Facility (TDCJ Identification Code: NF, also referred to as the Holliday Transfer Unit), is a Texas Department of Criminal Justice transfer facility for men located in Huntsville, Texas. Holliday is along Interstate 45 and .5 miles (0.80 km) north of Texas State Highway 30. The unit, on a 1,412-acre (571 ha) plot of land, is co-located with the Wynne Unit.

Holliday, one of the largest transfer facilities in Texas, is across the street from the Texas Prison Museum. Holliday is one of two prisons in the TDCJ that, as of 2003, is named after an African-American.

== History ==
Richard Watkins, a senior African-American prison warden, led an effort to have a prison named for C. A. Holliday, an African-American community activist and pastor in the Huntsville area. Watkins sent many letters to Governor of Texas Ann Richards, asking her to name a prison after Holliday. The $30 million Holliday Unit, with a capacity of around 2,000 beds, opened in January 1994. Cigarette smoking at Holliday was forbidden since the facility's opening, while a TDCJ-wide smoking ban, stemming from a November 18, 1994 Texas Board of Criminal Justice unanimous decision to forbid smoking at all TDCJ facilities, began on March 1, 1995.

== Facility ==
Holliday, an industrial-scale complex, has sheet metal siding and low sloping roofs. Robert Perkinson, author of Texas Tough: The Rise of America's Prison Empire, said that the "hastily-constructed" transfer unit "looks like an assemblage of discount tire outlets," and that the only features that indicate that it is a prison is the razor wire and guard towers. Jim Willett, a Huntsville resident and a former warden, said that Holliday is "a giant tin barn that serves as Texas's prison purgatory, the place you go between jail and the real thing."
