= Hodge Unit =

Prison in Texas, United States

Coordinates: 31°48′38″N 95°9′44″W

Jerry H. Hodge Unit, a part of the Texas Department of Criminal Justice (TDCJ), is a state prison for men in Rusk, Texas; it is on Farm to Market Road 2972, west of Texas State Highway 69 North. It opened in March 1995.

It is on a 58-acre (23 ha) lot, co-located with the Skyview Unit. It has a capacity of 989 prisoners. The inmates live in traditional prison cells.

The prison's inmates have mental disabilities. Prison guards assigned to Hodge take special training to come to this prison. As of 1999, most prisoners stay for about 20-60 days before returning to a general-purpose prison, but some stay long-term. Steve McVicker of the Dallas Observer wrote that at Hodge and Skyview "both guards and prisoners seem more relaxed than their counterparts at other prisons".
