= Windham School District (Texas) =

Non-geographical school district in Texas

Location
- United States

District information
- Grades: Adult
- Established: 1969
- Superintendent: Kristina J. Hartman, Ed.S.
- Schools: 100 campuses
- NCES District ID: 4800291

Students and staff
- Students: ~50,000 annually
- Staff: Over 1,000

Other information
- Website: www.wsdtx.org

The Windham School District (Windham) is a school district that provides educational services to students in the Texas Department of Criminal Justice (TDCJ). The district has its headquarters in Huntsville. The school district is a separate and distinct organization from the TDCJ. Windham is one of the largest correctional education systems in the United States, providing educational programs and services in most TDCJ facilities. The Texas Board of Criminal Justice acts as the board of education for the district. The members of the board are appointed by the Governor of Texas.

== History ==
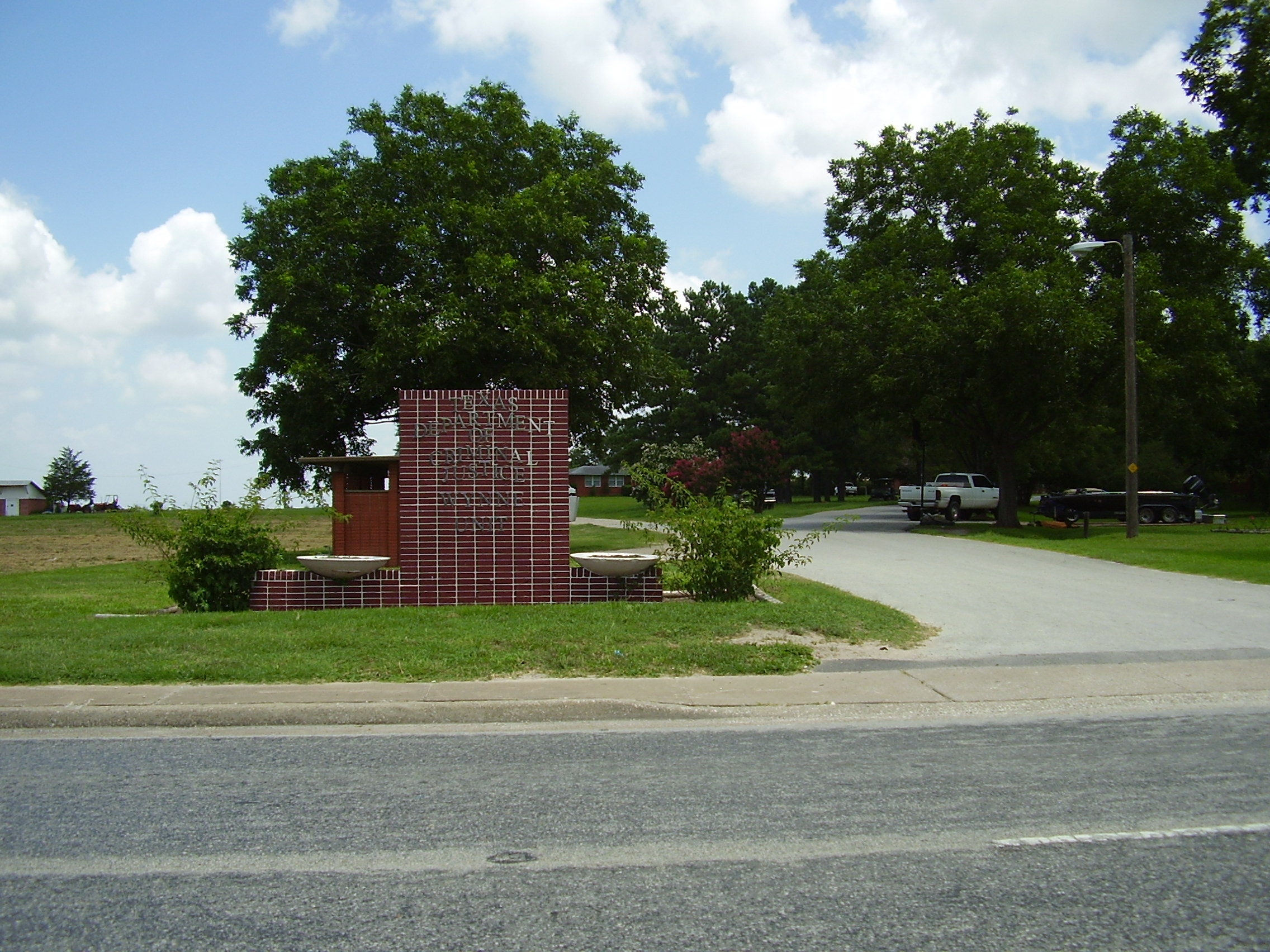
The Wynne Unit has the headquarters of the school district

George Beto, the former director of the Texas Department of Criminal Justice (TDCJ), advocated for the establishment of the district. The Texas Legislature established the district, which began operation in 1969. The Texas Board of Corrections named the district after James M. Windham, who had been a member of the board for 24 years. The district was the first school system of its size to be established within a statewide prison system.
