= William R. Boyd Unit =

Prison in Teague, Texas, United States

- Location in Texas
- Location: 200 Spur 113 Teague, Texas 75860-2007; 31.672869°N 096.19964°W
- Status: Operational
- Security class: G1, G2, G4, Safekeeping
- Capacity: 1,372
- Population: 1,346 (February 2017)
- Opened: 1992
- Managed by: TDCJ Correctional Institutions Division
- Warden: Cynthia Tilley
- Website: www.tdcj.texas.gov/unit_directory/by.html

The William R. Boyd Unit is a state Prison housing male inmates located approximately 6 miles northeast of Teague, Texas and approximately 5 miles southwest of Fairfield, Texas.

The prison is on approximately 734 acres of land and is operated by the Texas Department of Criminal Justice Correctional Institutions Division employing 292 people as of August 31, 2012.
