= Bridgeport Correctional Center =

Jail in Bridgeport, Connecticut

- Interactive map of Bridgeport Correctional Center
- Location: Bridgeport, Connecticut; 41°11′26″N 73°12′04″W
- Status: Open
- Security class: Level 4 (High)
- Capacity: 860
- Population: 645 (as of April 1, 2024)
- Opened: 1958
- Managed by: Connecticut, Department of Correction
- Warden: Jesus Guadarrama

Bridgeport Correctional Center is a high-security state jail for men in Bridgeport, Connecticut. It was built in 1958 and received its first inmates the same year. It houses both pre-trial defendants and sentenced offenders for the courts of Ansonia, Derby, Milford, Bridgeport, Danbury, Norwalk, and Stamford.

== History ==
The original building on the prison campus was built in 1958. In 1974, a new addition was opened and the original building was turned over to the Bridgeport courts for use as judges' chambers and housing for pre-trial detainees. A fire in 1990 led to the demolition of the original facility. All inmates are now housed in either cell blocks in the "New Center" or in one of three open dorm units: Madison, North Wing, and Memorial.

== Programs ==
- Addiction services
- Educational services
- Recreational services
- Religious services
- Volunteer services
