= Rogelio Sanchez State Jail =

Prison in Texas, United States

Coordinates: 31°48′49″N 106°15′06″W

- Interactive map of Rogelio Sanchez State Jail
- Location: 3901 State Jail Road El Paso, Texas
- Status: open
- Capacity: 1100
- Opened: Feb 1996
- Managed by: Texas Department of Criminal Justice

The Rogelio Sanchez State Jail is a medium-security prison for men located in El Paso, El Paso County, Texas, with an official capacity of 1100.
