= Skyview Unit =

Prison in Texas, United States

Coordinates: 31°48′42″N 95°9′56″W

Skyview Unit is a Texas Department of Criminal Justice (TDCJ) co-gender state prison in Rusk, Texas; it is on Farm to Market Road 2972, west of Texas State Highway 69 North. It opened in July 1988.

It is on a 58-acre (23 ha) lot, co-located with the Hodge Unit. It has a capacity of 528 prisoners, most of whom live in dormitories.

The prison houses mentally ill inmates. Prison guards assigned to Skyview take special training to come to this prison. As of 1999 most prisoners stay for about 20-60 days before returning to a general purpose prison, but some stay long-term. In 1999, Steve McVicker of the Dallas Observer wrote that at Hodge and Skyview "both guards and prisoners seem more relaxed than their counterparts at other prisons". As of 1999, unlike most TDCJ prisons, Skyview is air conditioned, so the prison administrators at that time turned away prisoners who they suspected were faking mental illnesses.

As of April 2020 there were 479 inmates.

== Notable inmates ==
- Diane Zamora – convicted for the murder of Adrianne Jones
- Patrick Crusius – perpetrator of the 2019 El Paso Walmart shooting
