= Clarence N. Stevenson Unit =

State prison in Cuero, Texas, United States

Coordinates: 29°08′02″N 97°17′51″W

- Interactive map of Clarence N. Stevenson Unit
- Location: 1525 F-M 766 Cuero, Texas
- Status: open
- Security class: G1, G2, G4
- Capacity: 1384
- Opened: April 1994
- Managed by: Texas Department of Criminal Justice

The Clarence N. Stevenson Unit is a state prison for men located in Cuero, DeWitt County, Texas, owned by operated by the Texas Department of Criminal Justice. This facility was opened in April 1994, and a maximum capacity of 1384 male inmates held at minimum custody G-1/G-2 and medium G-4 security levels.

Controversy, Prisoners Limited Rights and Prison Discipline Abuse: This prison unit, like many others in the state of Texas has been subject to accusations of prison guard abuse:

"Recently we have seen that guards can, and do, “set up” inmates by planting illegal evidence in a cell or by creating fraudulent allegations leading to a wrongful conviction of a discipline rule. The damage that visits the inmate and his/her loved ones over intended or fraudulent discipline abuses by TDCJ employees occurs far too often and causes far too much unnecessary emotional pain and frustration for the offender and loved ones. Such action by institutional TDCJ employees does not further inmate respect or rehabilitation. Thank God for Keri Blakinger and the Houston Chronicle for her exposing the reality of this damage."
