= Texas Department of Criminal Justice =

Department of the government of Texas

Agency overview
- Formed: 1885
- Employees: 37,000 (2005)
- Annual budget: US$3,302,926,598 (2018)

Jurisdictional structure
- Operations jurisdiction: Texas, USA
- Map of the Texas Department of Criminal Justice's jurisdiction
- Area: 261,797 square miles (678,050 km^{2})
- Population: 29,145,505 (2020)
- General nature: Civilian police

Operational structure
- Headquarters: Brad Livingston Administrative Headquarters; Huntsville, Texas
- Agency executives: Bobby Lumpkin, Executive Director, Texas Department of Criminal Justice; Eric Nichols, Chairman, Texas Board of Criminal Justice

Website
- tdcj.texas.gov

The Texas Department of Criminal Justice (TDCJ) is a department of the government of the U.S. state of Texas. The TDCJ is responsible for statewide criminal justice for adult offenders, including managing offenders in state prisons, state jails, and private correctional facilities, funding and certain oversight of community supervision, and supervision of offenders released from prison on parole or mandatory supervision. The TDCJ operates the largest prison system in the United States.

The department has its headquarters in the Brad Livingston Administrative Headquarters in Huntsville and offices at the Price Daniel Sr. Building in downtown Austin.

== History ==
=== 1800s ===
In 1848, the Texas Legislature passed "An Act to Establish a State Penitentiary", which created an oversight board to manage the treatment of convicts and administration of the penitentiaries. Land was acquired in Huntsville and Rusk for later facilities.

The prison system began as a single institution, located in Huntsville. A second prison facility, Rusk Penitentiary, began receiving convicts in January 1883. Before the Ruiz v. Estelle court case, the Texas Department of Corrections had 18 units, including 16 for males and two for females.

Various administrative changes where the organization of the managing board of the department occurred over the next 100 years.

=== 1900s ===
In 1921, George W. Dixon of The Prison Journal published a report on the Texas Prison System facilities. His article stated that the prisons were among the most "brutal" in the world. Dixon said that the prisons featured corporal punishment such as whipping, beatings, and isolation.

In July and August 1974, a major riot at the Huntsville Walls prison resulted in the murder of two hostages. This was not a riot, but an escape attempt in which the whole Huntsville Unit was shut down. Inmates were Fred Gomez Carrasco, Rudolpho Domingez and Ignacio Cueves.

In 1979, Ruiz v. Estelle found that the conditions of imprisonment within the TDC prison system constituted cruel and unusual punishment in violation of the United States Constitution. The decision led to federal oversight of the system, with a prison construction boom and "sweeping reforms ... that fundamentally changed how Texas prisons operated."

In 1989, the TDCJ and the Board of Criminal Justice were created. The board is composed of nine members appointed by the governor with the advice and consent of the senate to six-year, overlapping terms. This new agency absorbed functions of three state agencies - the Texas Department of Corrections, the Texas Board of Pardons and Paroles, and the Texas Adult Probation Commission.

In the 1980s, the government of Texas began building more prisons. During that decade, impoverished rural communities viewed the prisons as a boon, as they provided jobs.

In 1987, the Texas State Board of Corrections voted to build two new 2,250-inmate maximum-security prisons in Gatesville and Amarillo and several 1,000-inmate medium-security prisons in Liberty County, Marlin, Snyder, and Woodville. The TDC units in Amarillo and Snyder were the first ones located outside of Central Texas and East Texas.

James Anthum "Andy" Collins, the executive director of the TDCJ from April 10, 1994, to around December 1995, became a consultant for VitaPro, a company selling a meat substitute that was used in Texas prisons. Shirley Southerland, a prisoner at the Hobby Unit, stated that her fellow prisoners discovered that the VitaPro product was intended for consumption by canines. Collins arranged for VitaPro to be used while he was still the head of the TDCJ. Collins had awarded a $33.7 million contract to the company. Robert Draper of the Texas Monthly accused various TDCJ board members and state officials in the early to mid-1990s of capitalizing on the rapid expansion of Texas prisons – from 1994 to 1996 the number of prisoners almost doubled and the number of the prison units increased from 65 to 108 – and trying to establish favorable business contracts and get prisons named after them. Draper reasoned, "If [Allan B. Polunsky] and other board members didn't care about ethics, why should Andy Collins?"

=== 2000s, 2010s and 2020s ===
According to a December 2007 survey of prisoners from the U.S. Bureau of Justice Statistics, five TDCJ units, Allred Unit, Clemens Unit, Coffield Unit, Estelle Unit, and Mountain View Unit, were among those in the United States with the highest numbers of reported prison rape cases in 2006. In 2007, the TDCJ reported a total of 234 reported sexual assaults in its prisons. Michelle Lyons, the TDCJ spokesperson, said, "The actual reports we have are not consistent with the results in the survey, but because it's anonymous, there's no way for us to verify that additional number."

In 2008, the TDCJ planned to install cell phone-jamming devices at its units, but encountered resistance from cell phone companies.

In 2014, the Human Rights Clinic of the University of Texas School of Law released a report stating that the temperatures in many TDCJ units are too high over the summer and that at least 14 inmates had been killed by the heat since 2007. In 2013, the TDCJ had signed a deal for a climate-controlled housing system for pig breeding; this was worth $750,000. In response, John Whitmire of the Texas State Senate stated, "the people of Texas don't want air-conditioned prisons, and there's a lot of other things on my list above the heat. It's hot in Texas, and a lot of Texans who are not in prison don't have air conditioning." That year, a federal judge declared that the TDCJ is making it impossible for Muslim inmates to practice their religion.

In 2017, the use of solitary confinement as punishment was ended.

An October 2024 report by the Texas Sunset Advisory Commission documented severe staffing shortages throughout the prison system that put inmates and staff at risk. The report predicted that Texas prisons could soon run out of room. Some facilities were operating with only 30% of their guard positions filled, while the annual turnover rate for all Texas Department of Criminal Justice staff was 26%.

In 2026, U.S. District Judge Robert L. Pitman ordered the TDCJ to install air conditioning in all prisons by the end of 2029. TDCJ stated that it would appeal the ruling.

== Governance ==
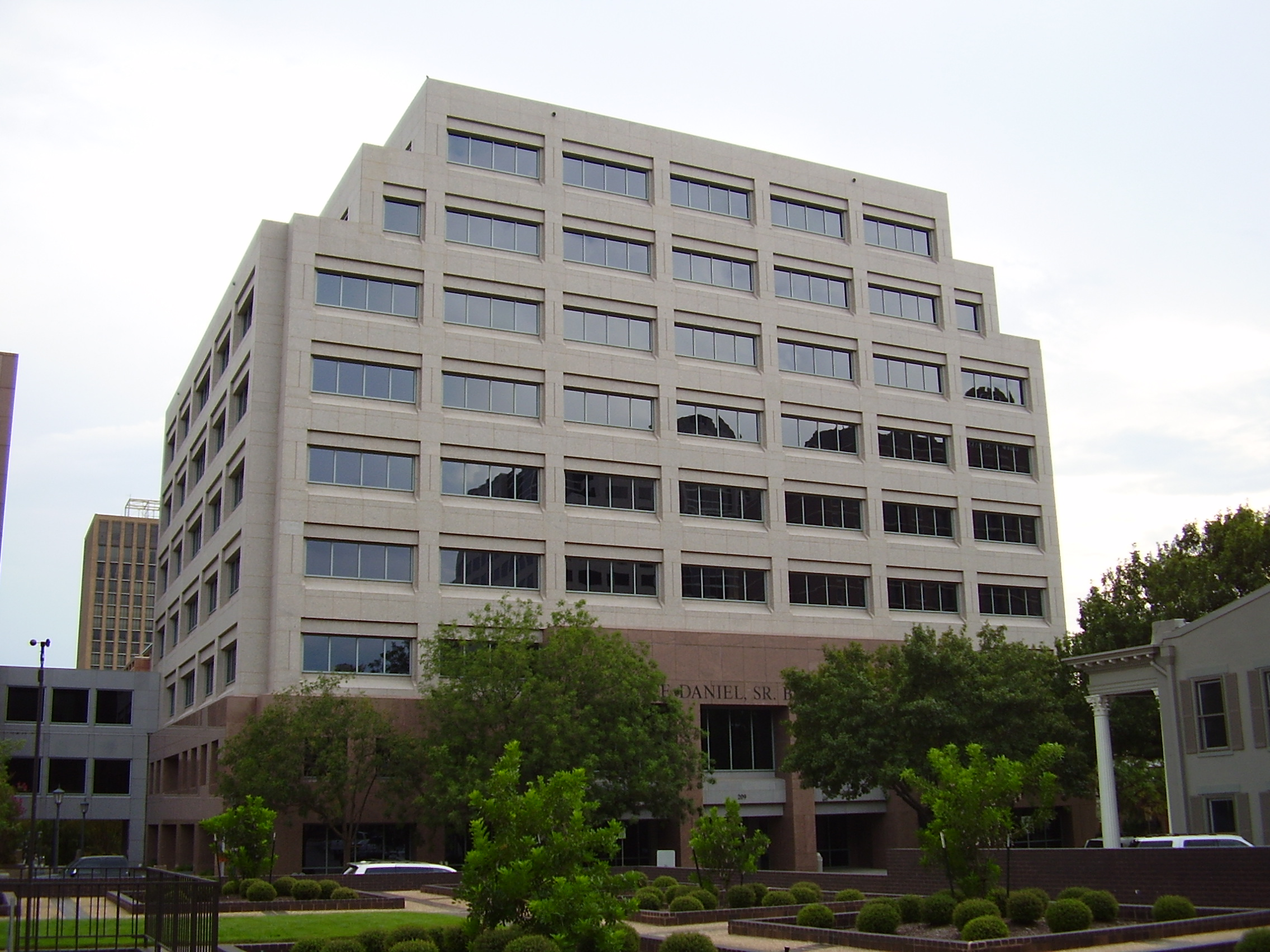
The agency has offices in the Price Daniel, Sr. State Office Building in Austin.

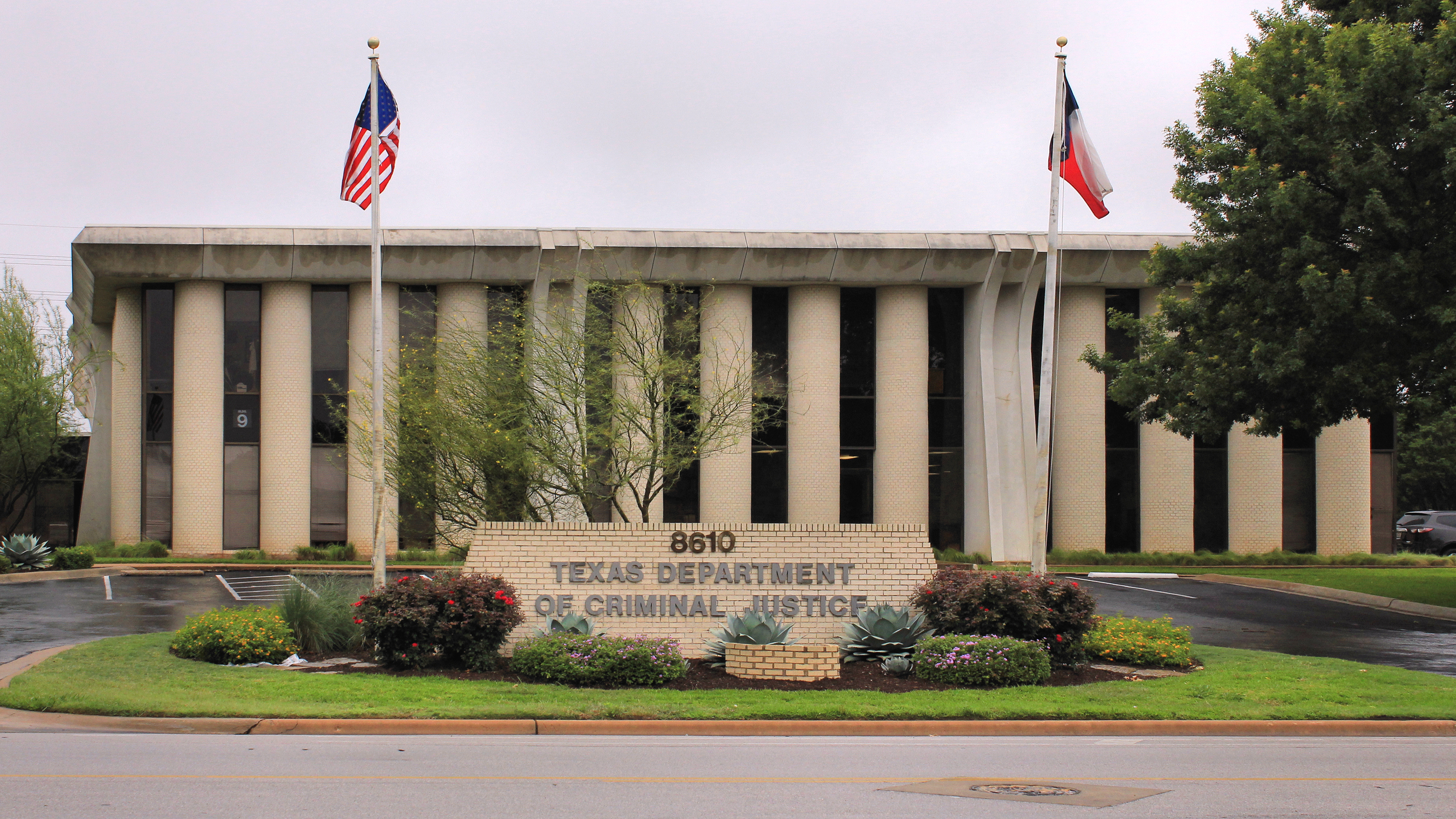
TDCJ offices in Austin

The Texas Board of Criminal Justice oversees the TDCJ. The board selects the executive director, who manages the TDCJ. The members of the board are appointed by the Governor of Texas.

=== Current board members ===
- Bobby Lumpkin (executive director)
- Eric Nichols (chairman)
- Faith Johnson (vice chairman)
- Pastor Nathanael Sprinkle (member)
- Tommy Fordice (member)
- Molly Francis (member)
- Sydney Zuiker (member)
- Sichan Siv (member)
- William Welch (member)
- Rodney Burrow, M.D. (secretary)

== Major divisions ==
The department encompasses these major divisions:

- Correctional Institutions Division
- Parole Division
- Community Justice Assistance Division

=== Correctional Institutions Division ===
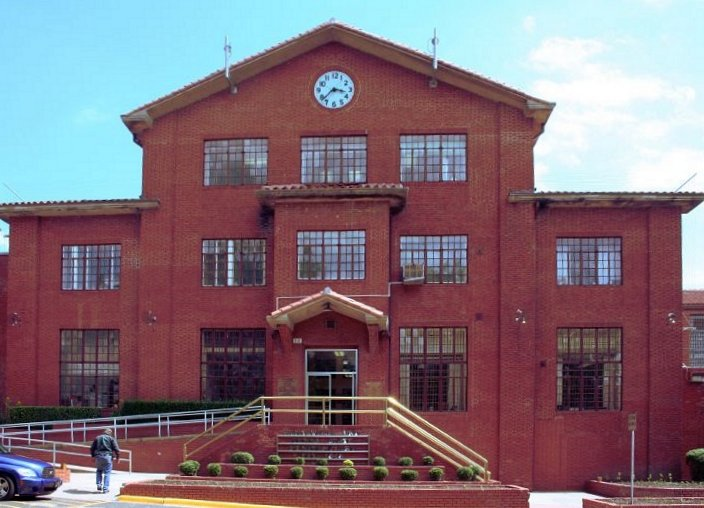
The Huntsville Unit in Huntsville is a prison operated by the Correctional Institutions Division; it houses the state execution chamber and formerly served as the agency's headquarters.

The Correctional Institutions Division, which operates secure correctional facilities for adults, has its headquarters in the Brad Livingston Administrative Headquarters in Huntsville. TDCJ-CID, formed in 2003, was a merger of the Institutions Division, the Operations Division, the Private Facilities Division, and the State Jail Division.

The division operates prisons, which are facilities for people convicted of capital offenses and people convicted of first-, second-, and third-degree felony offenses, and state jails, facilities for people convicted of state jail felony offenses. Before the 2003 formation of the Correctional Institutions Division, the Institutional Division operated prisons and the State Jail Division (TDCJ-SJD) operated state jails. As of 2010, of the counties in Texas, the five with the highest numbers of state prisons and jails were Walker, Brazoria and Coryell (tie), and Anderson and Liberty (tie).

As of 2001, prisons may be named after people who are dead or who are still alive, and namesakes have included Governors of Texas, TDCJ employees, members of the Texas House of Representatives, mayors, police officers, and judges. In previous eras, prisons were only named after deceased TDCJ employees and state governors. By the 2000s, so many new prisons were being built that the TDCJ had to change its naming policy.

Regional offices of the CID are: Region I, headquartered in Huntsville; Region II, headquartered on TDCJ prison property in Anderson County, near Palestine; Region III, headquartered on the property of the Memorial Unit in Brazoria County, near Rosharon; Region IV, headquartered in the former Chase Field Industrial Complex (a TDCJ property) in Beeville; Region V, headquartered in Plainview; and Region VI, headquartered on TDCJ property in Gatesville.

==== Correctional institutions ====
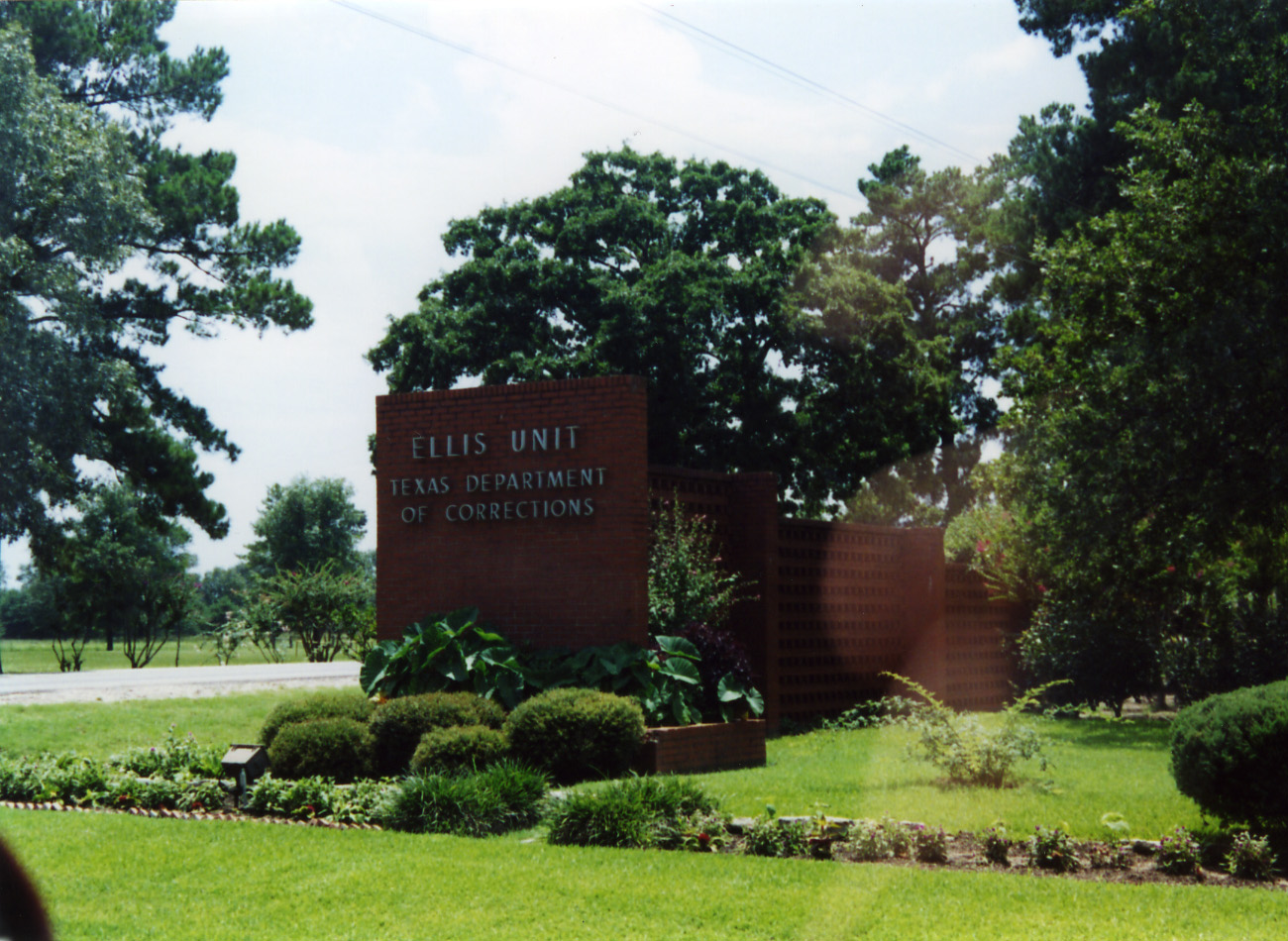
Ellis Unit, a prison that previously housed the male death row.

Most of the TDCJ prisons are located in the historic cotton slavery belt around the former location of Stephen F. Austin's colony. Counties that have housed adult correctional facilities, such as Brazoria, Fort Bend, Polk, and Walker, once had slave majority populations. Many of the largest prison farms and prison properties in the state, including Goree Unit, the Jester units, Polunsky Unit, the Ramsey units, and Wynne Unit, are located in those counties. The state of Texas began building adult prisons outside of the historic cotton belt in the 1980s.

Some units have employee housing; most employee housing was constructed prior to the TDCJ's early to mid-1990s prison expansion. As of 2008, of the 22 units that are staffed below 80% of their employee capacities, eight (36%) of the units have officers' quarters. As of that year, the TDCJ requested funding from the Texas Legislature for three 80-bed officers' quarters to be built next to three prisons that the agency considers to be "critically staffed."

An employee who obtains a residence in a state-owned house on or after September 1, 1997, pays $50 per month during the fiscal year of 1998, and for each subsequent year, 20% of the fair market rental valuation of the property. A resident of state-owned bachelor officers' quarters or a renter of a state-owned mobile home lot pays $75 per month.

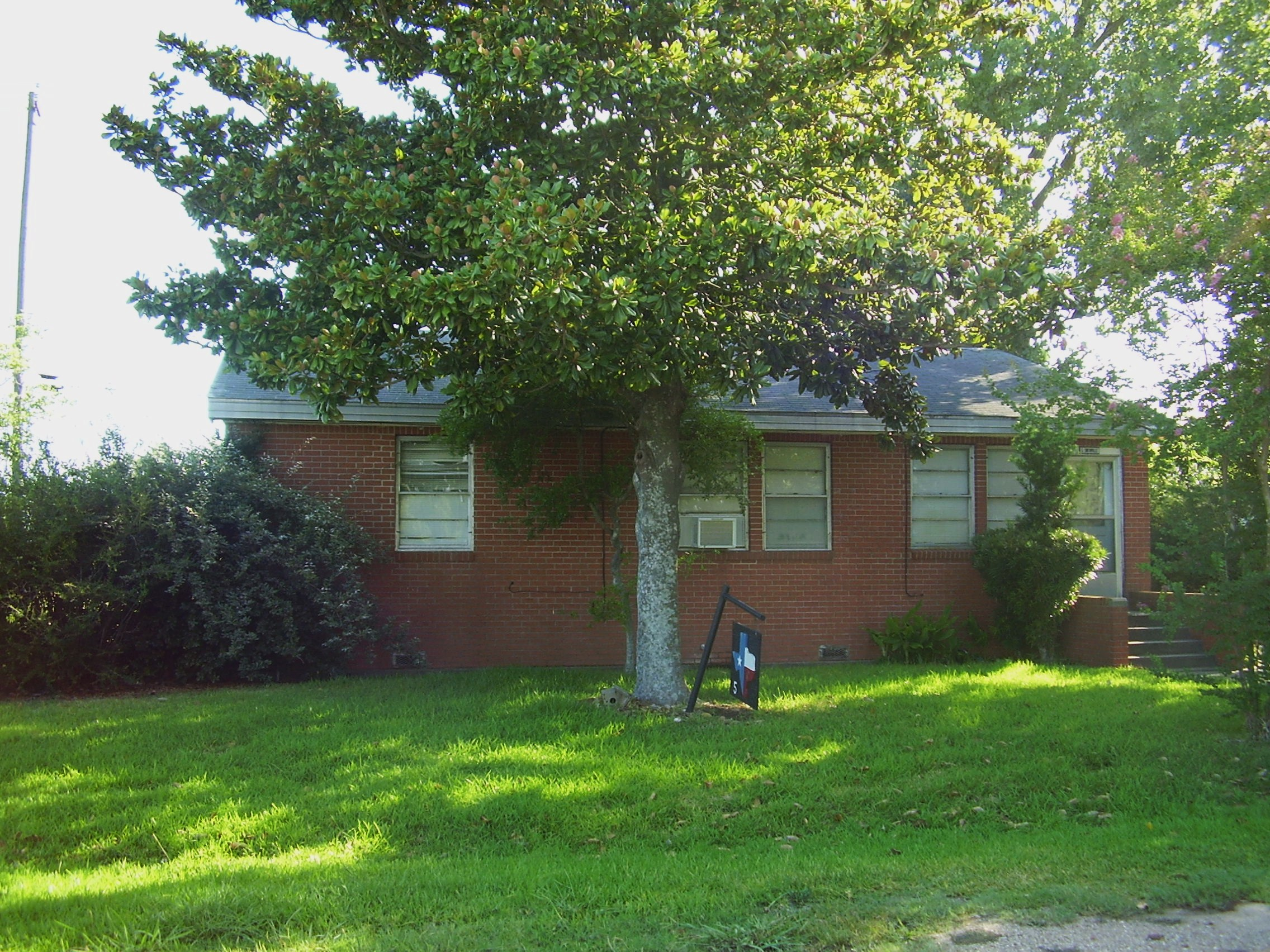
Some units have employee housing. This is a house of the Smithville Prison Property of the Central Unit.

The Texas Prison System purchased its first prison farm in 1885. The oldest TDCJ units still in operation, originally established between 1849 and 1933, include Huntsville Unit (1849), Wynne Unit (1883), Jester I Unit (1885, brick building in 1932), Vance (Harlem/Jester II) Unit (1885, brick building in 1933), Clemens Unit (1893), Ramsey (I) Unit (1908), Stringfellow (Ramsey II) Unit (1908), Goree Unit (1907), Memorial (Darrington) Unit (1917), and J. Dale Wainwright (Eastham) Unit (1917); prior to their closures Central Unit (1909, rebuilt in 1932) and Retrieve (later Wayne Scott) Unit (1919) were among the oldest prisons.

In addition, the Hilltop Unit uses buildings from the former Gatesville State School, a juvenile correctional facility, making the Hilltop Unit's prison facility the third-oldest correctional facility still-used in Texas after the Huntsville and Jester I. The largest TDCJ prison is the Coffield Unit, with a capacity of 4,021 inmates. The largest female prison is the Christina Crain Unit, with a capacity of 2,013 inmates.

Originally, many Texas prison farms had no cells; the prisoners were housed in racially segregated dormitory units referred to as "tanks". In the 1960s, the Texas Prison System began referring to the prisons as "units". Chad R. Trulson and James W. Marquart, authors of First Available Cell: Desegregation of the Texas Prison System, said that the word unit was a euphemism that probably was intended to refer to progressive penal practices, professionalism, and a distancing from a legacy of racism.

===== State jails =====
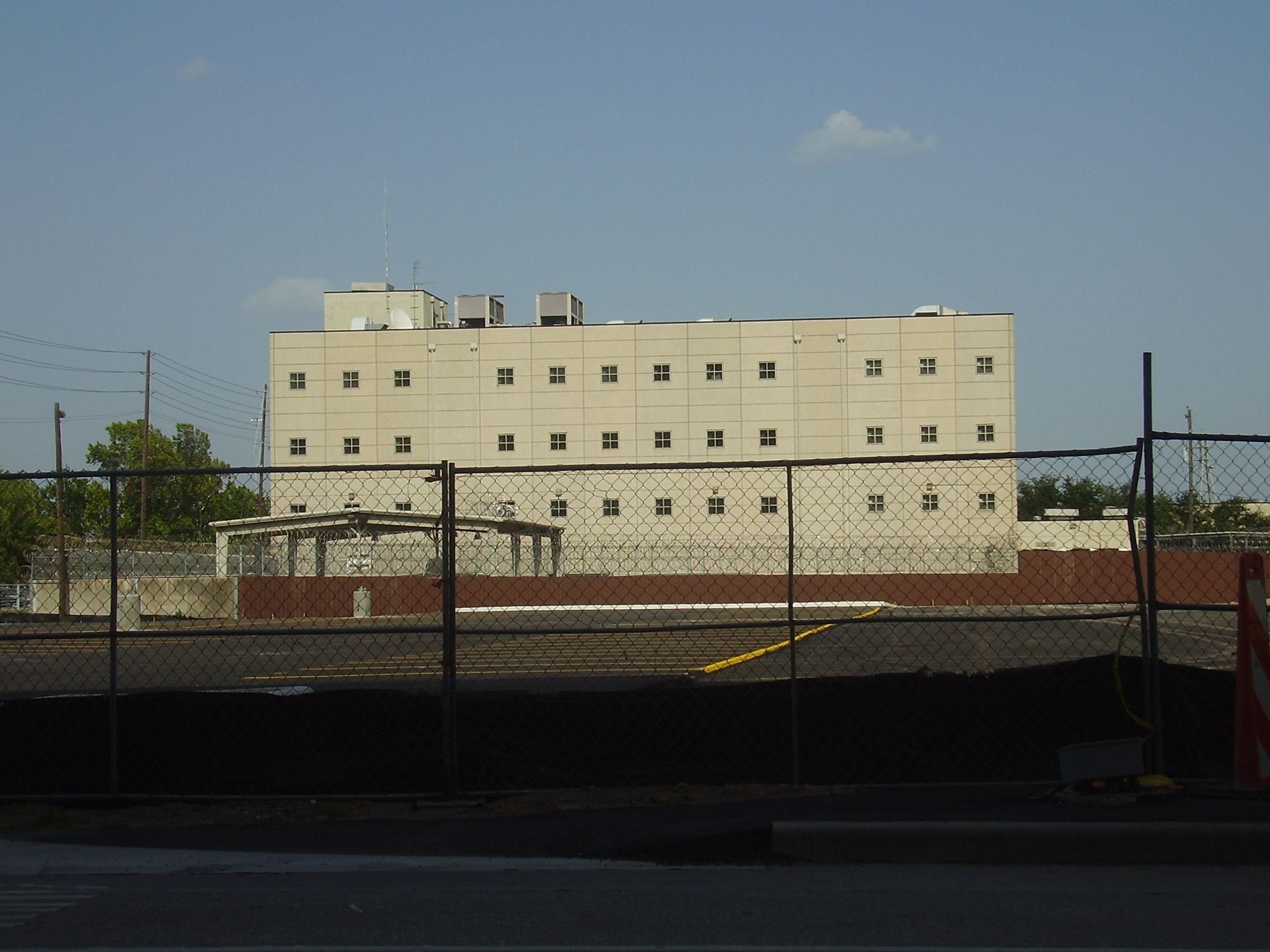
Joe Kegans Unit, downtown Houston

State jails house inmates convicted of state jail felony offenses, which include lower-level assault and drug, family, and property offenses. In addition the Texas Board of Criminal Justice designated state jails as transfer units for individuals who are bound for prisons. Individuals in a state jail who are convicted of a state jail offense must be held for at least 75 days and may not be held longer than 2 years. Individuals may not parole or have mandatory supervision release from state jails.

The state jail felony classification was created in 1993 as part of a reformation of sentencing laws. In July 1998, Texas had 18 state jails (including six privately operated facilities) with 9,023 state jail felons and 14,940 people awaiting transfer to prisons. During that year, 53.3% of state jail felons were convicted of possession or delivery of a controlled substance. As of 1998, 85% of the state jail felons had prior arrest records, and 58% of the state jail felons had previously never been incarcerated.

The highest level of educational programming available in state jails are general equivalency diploma classes.

===== Psychiatric units =====
The TDCJ operates three psychiatric units, including Jester IV Unit, Skyview Unit, and the John Montford Psychiatric Unit. As of March 2013, the units are at capacity. Brandi Grissom of the Texas Monthly said, "So acute is the need for psychiatric prisoners that if Texas built a fourth facility, it would be full as soon as it opened."

==== Intake and unit assignment ====
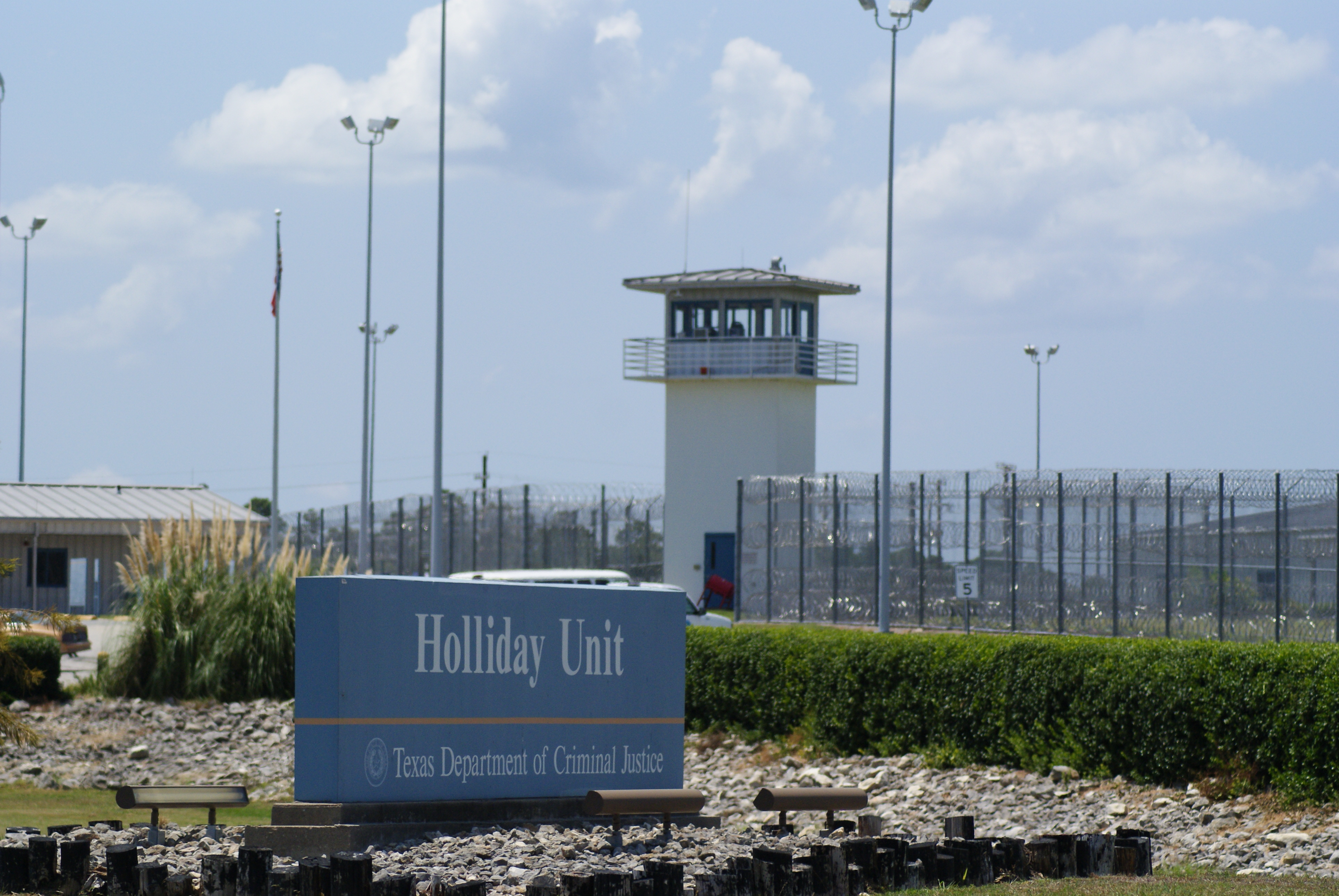
C.A. Holliday Unit in Huntsville serves as a transfer unit.

The State Classification Committee and designated Classification and Records Office staff members assign each institutional prisoner to his or her first unit after the prisoner completes his or her tests and interviews; offenders are not allowed to choose their units of assignment. The state assigns each state jail offender to the unit closest to his or her county of residence.

Death-row offenders and offenders with life imprisonment without parole enter the TDCJ system through two points; men enter through the Byrd Unit in Huntsville, and women enter through the Reception Center in Christina Crain Unit, Gatesville. From there, inmates with life without parole sentences go on to their assigned facilities. Male death-row offenders go to the Allan B. Polunsky Unit, and female death-row offenders go to the Mountain View Unit.

==== Transportation ====
The prisoner transportation network of the TDCJ is headquartered in Huntsville. As of 2005, the network has 326 employees, including 319 uniformed employees. The TDCJ's regional prisoner transportation hubs are located in Abilene, Amarillo, Beeville, Huntsville, Palestine, and Rosharon. Of the transportation hubs, the Central Region hub in Huntsville transports the largest number of prisoners to the greatest number of units. The Abilene hub controls the largest land area.

Prisoners in the general population are seated together, with prisoners handcuffed in pairs. Prisoners in administrative segregation and prisoners under death sentences are seated individually; various restraints, including belly chains and leg irons, are placed on those prisoners. Each prisoner transport vehicle has two urinals and two water dispensers. As of 2005, all of the transportation vans and half of the chain buses have air conditioning.

==== Offender rules ====
The Texas Department of Criminal Justice has the Offender Orientation Handbook, a guidebook explaining the rules prisoners are required to follow, posted on its website in English and Spanish. Individual prisoners receive formal orientations and copies of the manual after undergoing initial processing. The manual has 111 pages of rules of behavior. It is intended to establish governance over all aspects of prison life. The prison rule system is modeled on the free-world penal system, but it does not have judicial review and rights. The number of regulations has increased due to court orders, incidents, and managerial initiative.

Robert Perkinson, author of Texas Tough: The Rise of America's Prison Empire (2010), wrote that the Offender Orientation Handbook "encapsulates the weary institutional dream of imposing perfect discipline on potential chaos" and that the "sweeping and tedious rules" "cover a bewildering range of restrictions and obligations." As examples Perkinson referred to the "no fighting," "offenders will brush their teeth daily," and "horseplay is prohibited," which he refers to, respectively, as "sensible," "well meaning," and a "catchall." Perkinson said that in practice, "totalitarian order" is not established in the prison because the "churlish" inmates do not have the inclination and "often," the reading ability to follow the "finer dictates" of the handbook, and the correctional officers, "moderately trained, high-turnover stiffs earning Waffle House wages," do not have the energy and time to enforce the rules strictly. According to Perkinson, the handbook is never consistently or fully enforced, but it is invoked by officials whenever a daily conflict occurs.

In case of an escalated dispute, officers submit a "case" and an inmate or multiple inmates appear in front of a court described by Perkinson as "makeshift." Perkinson explains that several federal court orders have shaped the prison courts, which "have all of the trappings of adversarial justice," including a counsel substitute and a presiding captain, physical evidence, and witnesses. According to Perkinson, though, "the house [(the prosecution)] rarely loses." Jorge Renaud, a man who served as a prisoner in Texas's state prisons and the author Behind the Walls: A Guide for Families and Friends of Texas Prison Inmates, said usually when an inmate is charged with a prison offense, the sole question to be determined is the severity of the punishment to be given to the inmate.

Smoking is prohibited at all TDCJ facilities. On November 18, 1994, the Texas Board of Criminal Justice voted to ban smoking at all TDCJ facilities, beginning on March 1, 1995. The Holliday Unit in Huntsville already had a smoking ban in place prior to the TDCJ system-wide ban.

===== Offender dress code =====
Offenders in all TDCJ units wear uniforms consisting of cotton white pullover shirts and white elastic-waist trousers. The TDCJ requires prisoners to wear uniforms so they can easily be identified and to prevent correctional officers from forming associations and giving preferential treatment to any prisoners. The TDCJ retired clothing with belts and buttons and introduced trousers with expandable waists. Shoes worn by prisoners may be issued by the state or purchased from the commissary.

Male prisoners must be clean-shaven, unless they have been approved to grow a 1/2 inch religious beard, a provision that went into effect August 1, 2015. Usually their hair is required to be trimmed to the backs of their heads and necks. TDCJ-CID says that "Female offenders will not have extreme haircuts." In 2016, the 5th U.S. Circuit Court of Appeals ruled that religious inmates such as Muslims are allowed to grow 4-inch beards as well as wear religious clothing, so long as prisoners do not hide contraband. Inmate with longer hair are inspected by shaking their hair with their fingers. Prisoners must have hair cut around their ears. Native American prisoners, since 2019, received the right to wear long hair after court action.

Robert Perkinson, author of Texas Tough, says that the uniforms make prisoners "look like shapeless hospital orderlies." Jorge Renaud, a former prisoner, states that the uniforms are part of the prison system's depersonalization process.

===== Book review =====
The TDCJ reviews books to determine whether they are appropriate for prisoners. In 2010, the agency disclosed that it reviewed 89,795 books, with 40,285 authors represented. The agency did not disclose how many of those books were banned. The system's banned list includes some novels that were written by National Book Award winners, Nobel laureates, and Pulitzer Prize-winners, and some books of paintings made by notable artists. The Austin American-Statesman and the Houston Press compiled lists of some books that have been banned by the TDCJ, noting some are considered classics of the literary canon.

==== Prisoner release ====
The TDCJ uses regional release centers for male prisoners. Most male prisoners are released to be closer to their counties of conviction, approved release counties, or residences. Male prisoners who have detainers, are classified as sex offenders, have electronic monitoring imposed by the Texas Board of Pardons and Paroles, or have certain special conditions of the Super Intensive Supervision Program are released from Huntsville Unit, regardless of their counties of conviction, residences, or approved release counties.

Regional release facilities for men include the Huntsville Unit, the William P. Clements Jr. Unit near Amarillo; the Hutchins State Jail in Hutchins, near Dallas; the French M. Robertson Unit in Abilene; and the William G. McConnell Unit near Beeville. All female prisoners who are not state jail prisoners or Substance Abuse Felony Punishment Facility prisoners are released from the Christina Crain Unit (formerly the Gatesville Unit) in Gatesville. Rick Thaler, the director of the Correctional Institutions Division, predicted in 2010 that the Huntsville Unit, which serves as the regional release center for greater Houston, would remain the TDCJ's largest release center despite the decrease of traffic of released prisoners.

State jail offenders are released from their units of assignment. All people released receive a set of nonprison clothing and a bus voucher. State jail offenders receive a voucher to their counties of conviction. Prison offenders receive $50 upon their release and another $50 after reporting to their parole officers. Released state jail offenders do not receive money. Inmates in Substance Abuse Felony Punishment Facilities are also directly released.

===== History of prisoner release =====
Prior to September 2010, most male prison offenders were released from the Huntsville Unit. However, since the beginning of the COVID-19 pandemic in 2020, most inmates are now released from the last unit they were assigned to in their incarceration. Male inmates with health and mental health difficulties and sex offenders are still mostly released from Huntsville.

==== Death row ====
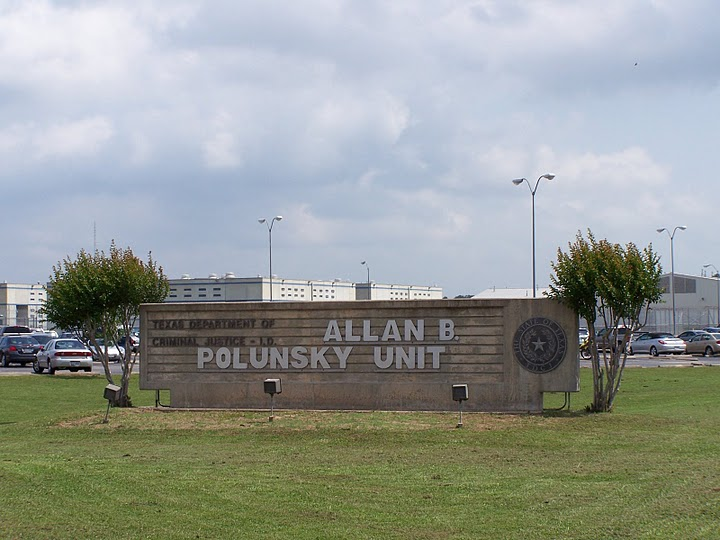
Allan B. Polunsky Unit, the location of the men's death row

The TDCJ houses male death-row inmates in the Polunsky Unit and female death-row inmates in the O'Daniel Unit. The Huntsville Unit is the location of the state of Texas execution chamber. The Polunsky death row has about 290 prisoners. As of March 2013, eight male death-row prisoners are housed in Jester IV Unit, a psychiatric unit, instead of Polunsky.

The state of Texas began housing death-row inmates in the Huntsville Unit in 1928. In 1965, the male death-row inmates moved to the Ellis Unit. In 1999, the male death row moved to Polunsky. In the 1923-1973 period, Texas state authorities had three female death-row inmates; the first, Emma "Straight Eight" Oliver, was held at Huntsville Unit after her 1949 sentencing, but had her sentence commuted to life imprisonment in 1951. Mary Anderson, sentenced to death in 1978, was held at Goree Unit. Her death sentence was reversed in 1982, and the sentence was changed to life.

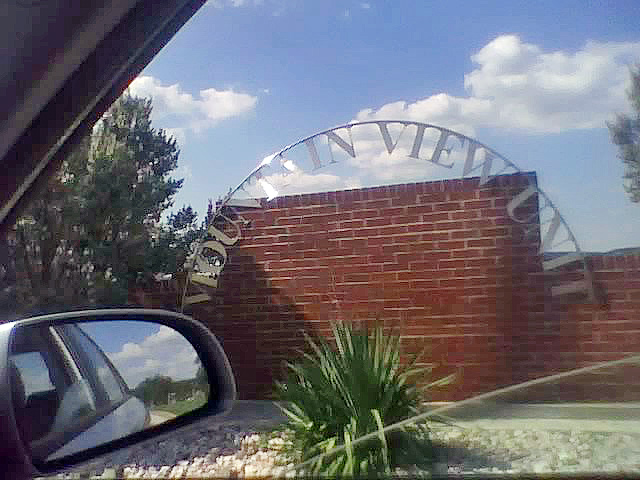
Mountain View Unit, the location of the women's death row

=== Health care ===
The University of Texas Medical Branch provides health care to offenders in the eastern, northern, and southern sections of Texas. The Texas Tech University Health Sciences Center provides health care to offenders in the western part of Texas. In addition, private corporations provide healthcare services. Hospitalized offenders may go to the Hospital Galveston Unit, the Montford Unit in unincorporated Lubbock County, or area hospitals.

In 1993, Texas State Comptroller John Sharp proposed that the TDCJ end its healthcare department and transfer responsibilities to the universities to reduce costs. During that time, most TDCJ prison units were in south and east Texas, and UTMB was to provide for the care of 80% of the managed care for TDCJ, while Texas Tech was to provide the remaining 20%. In September 1994, UTMB and Texas Tech took responsibility for 3,000 healthcare workers and a $270 million budget. In 2011, the board considered ending its contract with UTMB and having regional hospitals provide care for prisoners. In 2018, the department said it needed an additional $281 million in its 2020 budget to provide the required minimum amount of health care. To save money, the department rarely provides prisoners dentures, finding it cheaper to simply produce a blended diet in such cases.

As of 2017, 2.3 million incarcerated Americans depend on prisons for their healthcare. These incarcerated individuals face limited access to medical exams and prescriptions medications compared to the general population as they are not eligible for Medicaid while incarcerated. On top of that, inmates face fees for seeking medical treatment. In 35 states, inmates have medical co-payments which come out of their commissary accounts (made up of prison job payments and contributions from their family). The copays are enforced to prevent inmates from abusing the healthcare system, however, it becomes a burden on inmates whose job makes little to no money and can become a financial strain on the family.

==== Private Healthcare in Private Facilities ====
The two largest private prison companies, CoreCivic (formerly known as Corrections Corporation of America) and the GEO Group, run over 170 correctional facilities. In Texas, they have five facilities. These companies keep their operating costs low by using fewer dollars than allocated per inmate, especially in the area of Healthcare. Additionally, these companies and similar ones, avoid taking inmates over 65 or with chronic illnesses. When they cannot avoid it, they improvise ways to make it hard for the inmate to receive medical care. Specifically, CoreCivic has a history of denying hospital requests and punishing inmates when they make repeated requests. Additionally, the records of private prisons are not subject to public access laws.

==== Requesting Care ====
Requesting care in prison systems involves a simple procedural checklist that must be met in order to see any type of medical professional. Firstly, an incarcerated person must fill out a Sick Call Request form that should be answered within a 48-hour time period. After 48 hours, if there is no response, the person is to advance to fill out an I-60 form which states general issues faced. If the process continues to yield no approval, a Step 1 Grievance is filled out. This level of documentation is very strictly reviewed. Continuing to hear no response for an extended period of time indicates the time to advance to a Step 2 Grievance. After these options, the prisoner may now file a lawsuit for "exhausting administrative remedies."

A Sick Call Request form is a specified form that is specific towards what is wrong with the inmate medically. The progression to an I-60 form leads to a more generalized form that addresses seeing a doctor, contact visit, address changes and the like. A Step 1 Grievance is very strict and viewed very critically with certain guidelines such as only one problem can be addressed per grievance, only one grievance per week, must be reported within 15 days, and must be written with proper language. This form alone may take up to 40 days to be processed. A Step 2 Grievance is directly reviewed by TDCJ health committee and will have a response by 35 days. If these options are still not satisfactory, the inmate is then allowed to file a lawsuit because he/she has "exhausted administrative remedies."

Care through these methods is possible but is still a timely cost. Depending on how the prisoner is, the time between signing a form and receiving medication can mean life or death.

Even though there is a defined process for requesting medical care in prison systems, the prisoner is still trying to fill out theses forms while considered "sick." Along with this, the prisoners are expected to cover the costs associated with filing out these expensive papers. For the first healthcare visit in a year, an inmate will be charged $100 to their trust fund. However, there are instances where the inmate would not have to cover the cost of care such as chronic illnesses, follow-up visits, emergency treatments, etc.

The $100 medical co-pay has since been abolished and now offenders are charged $7.50 per visit until they reach the annual cap of $100. Once the annual cap has been reached, the offender will not be charged for further visits. Fortunately though, care is not restricted if one does not have the necessary funds.

Additionally, University of Texas Medical Branch (UTMB) decided that the easiest and most cost-effective way to dole out prescription medications to inmates was to distribute it from their own pharmacy. This pharmacy is based in an unmarked building in Huntsville and serves 130 facilities throughout the state, including juvenile facilities, by filling over 20,000 prescriptions per day. Orders are sent out through an electronic medical record system and are processed with custom-made conveyor belts and automated machines. The pharmacy has a 24-hour next-business-day turnaround ensuring medications can get to inmates as soon as possible.

===== History of Healthcare =====
Healthcare in Texas remained unchanged over time due to its simplicity. One aspect that did change was how the cost of healthcare for incarcerated persons fluctuated.

An issue that was prominent in prison systems was the costs associated with treatment. For this reason, the Correctional Managed Health Care Committee (CMHCC) was established in 1993. This committee focuses on the rising costs of healthcare and how that effects inmates. The CMHCC hopes to open a statewide managed health care plan giving offenders the ability to afford care with timely access.

=== Mental Health ===
The decline of mental health treatment within detainees has become a major concern in the prison system, especially in the Texas prison departments. While the Texas Department of Criminal Justice claims that most of its facilities are capable of treating mental health issues, this does not seem to be the case. Texas provides at least 20% of inmates mental health treatment and this small percentage could be explained by the shortage of volunteers and staff to provide these mental treatments. There is also failure to recognize mental symptoms and make a correct diagnosis for these detainees. Lack of mental aid has increased serious assaults and violent behaviors in which most of these cases have been declined by the Bureau of Prisons for "privacy reasons." Policies have been changed by the Bureau of Prisons to increase check-ins by once a month or weekly. However, the TDCJ has attempted to minimize these issues as best as it can. Detainees are offered guidelines on how to manage their stress and sanity before being released to the public. In terms of support and care, there is the Offender Grievance Program that allows offenders to communicate with faculty staff about questions, regards, or concerns associating with their sentence. In addition, the TDCJ Ombudsman Program makes referrals to an agency staff to help resolve problems and answer questions regarding a specific offender. The Peer Recovery Support Services hold classes to allow prisoners to help one another recover from their issues. Those that obtain a certificate from the program are eligible to work or volunteer as a Peer Recovery Support Specialist. This further build a community-based environment where prisoners can understand each other's mistakes and problems and cooperate as a team to provide solutions to better themselves. Specific programs are held for detainees that are of a particular background and history. The Chaplaincy Program is a nondiscriminatory program that permits prisoners to pursue their religious faiths, reconcile relationships, and strengthen families. The program offers mentoring, space for spiritual growth, pastoral care, life skill classes, accountability/support groups, etc. Similarly, the "InnerChange" Faith-Based- Pre-Release Program functions in the same way as the Chaplaincy Program to further help detainees recover well. For younger offenders, the Youthful Offender Program aids young offenders with special needs to the Mentally Retarded Offenders Program (MROP) or Physically Hanicapped Offenders Program (PHOP). Regular youth offenders are placed in interdisciplinary programming established on a weekly schedule, including:

- education
- social skills training
- anger management
- values development
- goal setting
- cognitive restructuring
- substance abuse education
- conflict resolution
- aggression replacement
- and life skills.

=== Recreation and Fitness ===
Leisure activities are meant for enhancing potential life skills post-release and allowing inmates an opportunity to complete activities of their choice. In terms of recreation and fitness, inmates have the chance to participate in structured fitness sessions that offer regular and moderate levels of exercises monitored by staff. Staff members are to take into account the kind of activity the detainee wants to do, the amount of time spent on that activity, and given permission. These fitness sessions occur in the either on the "Rec. Yard" or the gymnasium. Most units offer a basic basketball court, volleyball court, and crude walking path. Only certain units have weights and gym equipment for inmate use. The "Rec. Yard" is surrounded by a barbed-wire fence for extra supervision. During a detainee's time in prison, they are given a physical assessment that focuses on cardiovascular endurance, flexibility, body fat percentage, and dynamic strength. To further sharpen community-building skills, inmates are eligible to run special fitness and health events, including:

- Run/Walk Marathons
- Health fairs; health book fairs
- Nationally recognized health events

In addition to these health events, inmates have the opportunity to educate themselves in other health and sanity organizations. Staff will provide discussions concentrating on:

- Weight management
- Stress management
- Human anatomy
- Aerobic exercises
- Smoking cessation
- Back pain relief
- Nutrition

Ultimately, prisoners are able to utilize these resources to make them better returning members of society.

==== Incarceration of women ====
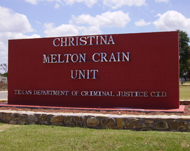
The Christina Crain Unit in Gatesville is the largest TDCJ unit housing women.

The Correctional Institutions Division has eight main facilities, including five prisons and three state jails, that house women; Five of the women's units, including four prisons and one state jail, are in the City of Gatesville. Renaud said that female prisoners in the TDCJ generally "undergo the same tribulations, are affected by the same policies, must adhere to the same regulations, and are treated the same by TDCJ staff."

Originally, women were housed in the Huntsville Unit. Beginning in 1883, women were housed in the Johnson Farm, a privately owned cotton plantation near Huntsville. After Governor Thomas Mitchell Campbell took office in January 1907, he moved the women from Johnson to the Eastham Farm (now Eastham Unit) to try to protect women from predatory prison guards.

For a period in the early 20th century, Eastham (currently Wainwright Unit) housed women before a sexual abuse scandal caused the Texas prison system to move women closer to Huntsville. Before the prisons in Gatesville opened in the 1980s, women in the Texas prison system were housed in the Goree Unit in Huntsville.

In 2010, a study from the National Women's Law Center and the Rebecca Project for Human Rights ranked the Texas prison system as giving "B+" care to women. A 2018 report by the Texas Criminal Justice Coalition stated that women in the TDCJ have fewer career-training and employment programs available than men; women had only two certification programs, while men had 21.

In 2019, the Texas Senate passed a bill, allowing inmates to have access to a greater variety of feminine hygiene products. They have access to various sized tampons and pads and can receive up to 10 free products per day.

===== Texas Prison Nurseries =====
There is currently no standard policy for what happens when a woman gives birth while incarcerated, because only recently have states begun to ban the shackling of pregnant women during active labor and childbirth. The Texas Department of Criminal Justice has created an initiative in collaboration with the University of Texas Medical Branch, called BAMBI (Baby and Mother Bonding Initiative). Within this program, eligible offenders will be provided with an opportunity to bond and form attachments, "...which is important to healthy growth and development, socialization, and psychological development during the infant's formative years, while in a safe and secure environment." However, all mothers within this program are only allowed to remain in it for 12 months. After this period they must have completed their sentence, and be prepared to transition back into society. The University of Texas Medical Branch found through their research with the BAMBI program that, "As the number of women giving birth in prisons continues to trend upward, the need for more programs to promote [the] best outcomes for both mother and infants is crucial."

On average, about 250 babies are born to Texas Department of Criminal Justice inmates each year. The Santa Maria Hostel provides a residential setting for these mothers and their infants.

However, compared to other states, Texas' prison nursery system is limited in accessibility to mothers and infants. Texas has one of the highest populations within its prisons, but resources to women and their infants is still limited.

On September 1, 2009, two laws were passed in the 81st Texas legislature. One prohibited the use of restraints on female prisoners during childbirth. The other asked that the counties write and implement procedures in regards to the health of their pregnant inmate population. Another law was passed in 2019 that stipulated that pregnant inmates cannot be shackled at all during their pregnancy or when they are recovering after childbirth. As there is no set policy for how long a mother can remain with her infant after birth, the other proposal that has yet to be passed would allow 72 hours of bonding time if the inmate does not qualify for the BAMBI program. Also, it mandates more formal training for officers to protect the physical and mental safety of pregnant inmates.

Prison nurseries are imperative for both the wellbeing of the child and the mother. The CDC reported that infant mortality rates for "...babies separated from their incarcerated mothers is 7.9 infant deaths per 1,000 live births for Hispanic inmates and 14.3 for Black inmates. By comparison, the national infant mortality rate is 5.96 deaths per 1,000 live births." Thus, there is also a racial component to the treatment of pregnant women within the Texas prison. This may have to do with the fact that Texas prison healthcare does not offer screenings and treatments for high-risk pregnancies. They also lack resources to implement policy to give expectant mothers advice on nutrition, activity level, and safety. In addition, records of pregnancies and deliveries do not have to be written, and thus this could be another factor to explain the higher infant mortality. Unfortunately, in the general population within Texas, black non-Hispanics families were disproportionately affected by infant mortality. The prison trend follows the societal trend of infant mortality, which shows that there are disparities both within the prison system and the general population in terms of healthcare and preventative care.

==== Correctional officer training ====
The TDCJ maintains training academies in Beeville, Gatesville, Huntsville, Palestine, Plainview, and Rosharon. Trainees who do not live within a commuting distance to the training academies take state-owned housing, only if room is available.

==== Demographics ====
In 1974, the TDC had about 17,000 prisoners; 44% were black, 39% were non-Hispanic white, 16% were Hispanic and Latino, and 1% were of other races. About 96% were male and 4% were female. At the time, all 14 prison units of the TDC were in Southeast Texas.

As of August 31, 2022, TDCJ had a total of 121,976 prisoners, 32.5% were Black, 33.5% were non-Hispanic White, 33.3% were Hispanic, and 0.6% were other or unknown race. 92.5% were male and 7.5% were female.

=== Parole Division ===
The TDCJ Parole Division supervises released offenders who are on parole, inmates in the pre parole transfer program, and inmates in the work program. The division also investigates proposed parole plans from inmates, tracks parole eligible cases, and submits cases to the Texas Board of Pardons and Paroles. The division does not make decisions on whether inmates should be released or whether paroles should be revoked. The TDCJ Parole Division has its central office in Austin.

==== Halfway houses ====
The parole division contracts with several agencies which operate halfway houses. Organizations that contract with the TDCJ include GEO Group (previously Cornell Corrections), Southern Corrections, Wayback House, E.P. Horizon Management, L.L.C., and Avalon. As of 2004, nine halfway houses are in Texas. According to state law, former prisoners must be paroled to their counties of conviction, usually their home counties, if those counties have acceptable halfway-housing facilities available. Most counties do not have such facilities available. As of 2004, three facilities accept sex offenders and parolees from other counties; they are the halfway houses in Beaumont, El Paso County, and Houston.

The Ben A. Reid Community Corrections Center, a halfway house operated by GEO and previously operated by Cornell, is located in the former Southern Bible College facility in Houston. As of 2004, the facility housed almost 400 parolees; 224 of them were subject to sex offender registration. Because of aspects of state law and because of a shortage of halfway houses, almost two-thirds of the sex offenders were from outside of Harris County. Reid is the largest of the three halfway houses that take sex offenders and out of county parolees, so Reid gets a significant number of paroled sex offenders.

Cornell operates a halfway house in Beaumont, which as of 2004 houses 170 people. Horizon Management, L.L.C. operates the El Paso facility in unincorporated El Paso County, which houses 165 people. In addition, Wayback House operates the Wayback House in Dallas, E.P. Southern Corrections operates the Austin Transition Center in Austin, and Avalon operates the Fort Worth Transitional Center in Fort Worth.

=== Community Justice Assistance Division ===
The Community Justice Assistance Division supervises adults who are on probation. In 1989, the 71st Texas Legislature began using the term "community supervision" in place of the term "adult probation." CJAD has its central office in the Price Daniel, Sr. Building in Austin.

=== Enrichment programs ===
In the 1990s, Governor Ann Richards created enrichment programs for prisons. Michael Hoinski of the Texas Monthly stated that they "had helped spawn a golden age of paño-making in Texas." The programs were ended during the terms of Governors George W. Bush and Rick Perry, and paños are now prohibited in the TDCJ.

== Other divisions ==
The Human Resources Division also serves the agency. As of August 23, 2010, the Human Resources Headquarters moved to Suite 600 of 2 Financial Plaza in Huntsville. The division was located at 3009 Texas State Highway 30 West.

The Rehabilitation Divisions Program operates programs to rehabilitate prisoners. The division is headquartered in Huntsville.

Texas Correctional Industries, a division of the TDCJ, was established in 1963 when the Prison Made Goods Act, Texas Senate Bill 338, passed. The division manages the production of prisoner-made products.

== Prison reform ==
Texas state senator John Whitmire served as chair of the Senate Criminal Justice Committee for 30 years, from 1993 to 2023. With Texas representative Jerry Madden, chairman of corrections since 2005, Whitmire helped institute prison reform in the state. The creation of drug rehabilitation programs, the reduction of sentencing for drug crimes, an increase in the number of parole officers and the creation of special courts for specific crimes helped to reduce the state prison population and even led to the first prison closures in state history. The agency has also implemented a "Safe Prisons" program with the goal of implementing PREA policy throughout the state prisons and jails and reducing the incidents of prison rape.

== Media ==
Historically, The Echo was published in the Huntsville Unit. Prisoners served as the staff and the reader base. It began publication in 1928. As of 2009, it was mostly published continuously, although some periods occurred when the newspaper was not published.

In 2001, after the escape of the Texas 7, TDCJ officials stated that the room where the newspaper was published was a security risk and suspended the publication. The TDCJ fired the four prisoners who previously were responsible for composing the issues, and the control over the publication was passed to the Windham School District.

== Windham School District ==
The Windham School District provides offenders of the TDCJ with educational services. The district was created in 1969 to provide adult education in Texas prisons. The district was the first school system of its size to be established within a statewide prison system. Windham is one of the largest correctional education systems in the United States, providing educational programs and services in most TDCJ facilities. The school district is a separate and distinct organization from the TDCJ.

== Fallen officers ==
Since the inception of the Texas Department of Criminal Justice, 125 officers and one canine have died in the line of duty.

== Equipment ==
=== Current ===
==== Uniforms ====
As of 2026, Uniformed staff wear the Class A grey uniform shirt and blue pant or Class B grey polo shirt and blue BDU pant, as the old all grey class A uniform and class B blue polo with grey BDU pants are no longer issued, however they are permitted to be worn if a uniformed employee has obtained them prior to policy change. Honor Guard officers wear a ceremonial dress uniform similar to other law enforcement agencies with the TDCJ badge on the left chest area. Badges are not issued to officers outside of the Honor Guard except to assistant wardens and above; however, correctional officers are not prohibited from purchasing and displaying the badge on belts, jackets, or nonuniform clothing. Correctional training officers (academy training) wear red polo shirts as an optional uniform, which has correctional training-specific patches. Canine (K9) officers have been authorized to wear TDCJ K9 T-shirts as an optional uniform with the BDU pants. Outside field officers are permitted to wear dark grey jeans and a white TDCJ issued cowboy hat. Officers are required to wear black-colored belts with their uniforms. Officers are allowed to bring their own holsters and belt for carrying equipment that is issued by TDCJ. All equipment including OC spray, handcuffs, radios, and weapons is issued by TDCJ.

==== Service weapons ====
- Smith & Wesson Model 65
- Smith & Wesson M&P (K9 and Transportation)
- Remington 870
- Colt AR-15
- Ruger M77

=== Former ===
==== Uniforms ====
The uniformed staff wore brown uniforms with brown ties from 1955 to 1969. Female officers wore blue uniforms with a red ascot and were also available in a dress from 1969 to 1980. Blue ties were a part of the grey uniform until being removed from the uniform during the 1980s. Officers were issued metal badges for their shirts with the brown uniforms and with hats until 1990, when fabric patches replaced them. Camouflage jackets and hats were briefly issued in the early 1980s, but were discontinued due to their illegible appearance.

==== Service weapons ====
- Smith & Wesson Model 10
- Colt Official Police
- Savage double-barrel shotgun
- Ingram and Thompson submachine guns (retired 1970s)
- Winchester 1894 (retired in 2000)

== Headquarters ==
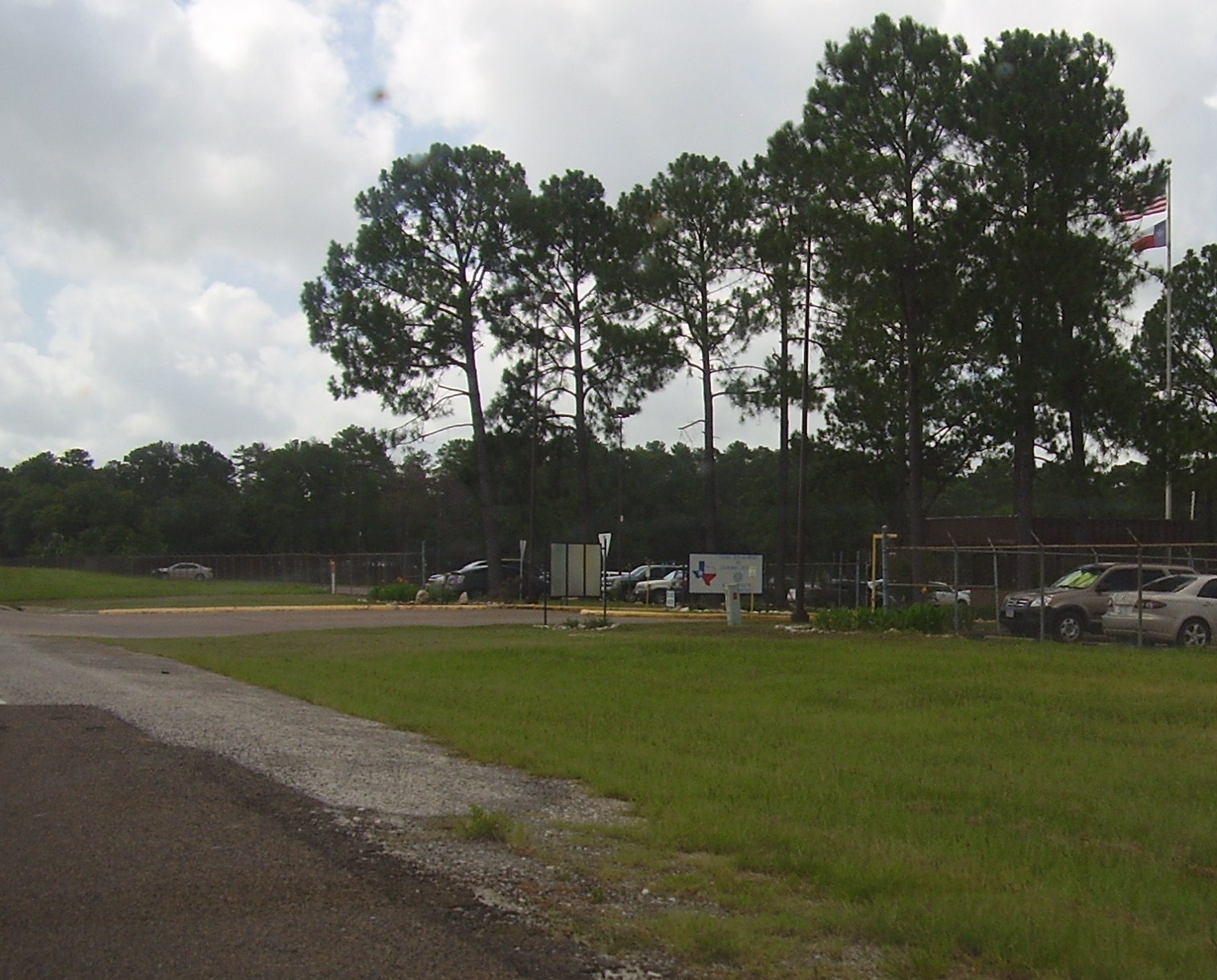
BOT Complex, the Texas Department of Criminal Justice Administrative Headquarters

The TDCJ has its headquarters in Huntsville. The administrative facility, known as the Brad Livingston Administrative Headquarters, and previously BOT Complex (for its former owner, see below), is located at Spur 59 off Texas Highway 75 North. The complex also faces Interstate 45. The complex includes the Central Region Warehouse and the Huntsville Prison Store. The Texas prison system had been headquartered in Huntsville since Texas's founding as a republic, and the TDCJ is the only major state agency not headquartered in Austin, the state capital.

The complex was originally owned by Brown Oil Tools, a subsidiary of Baker Hughes. Completed in 1981, the 600,000-square-foot (56,000 m^{2}) plant had a price tag of $9 million. The plant was built to replace the company's Houston plant. The plant employed 200 people. In 1987, Baker Hughes announced that it would close the plant and consolidate its operations to facilities in Houston; the company said that the Huntsville facility's large capacity caused it to be less efficient at lower operating levels. Judith Crown of the Houston Chronicle described the plant as "relatively modern" in 1987. TDCJ purchased the BOT Complex in 1989.

Historically, the Huntsville Unit served as the administrative headquarters of the Texas Prison System; the superintendent and the other executive officers worked in the prison, and all of the central offices of the system's departments and all of the permanent records were located in the prison.

In the two decades leading to 2011, many proposals were placed in the Texas Legislature to move the TDCJ headquarters to Austin. One reason why the proposals failed was because Huntsville-area prison officials opposed the move. In the 1990s, John Whitmire, a member of the Texas Senate, made an effort to have the TDCJ headquarters moved. During the last state legislative session before September 1, 2011, Texas House of Representatives member Jerry Madden decided not to ask for the TDCJ headquarters to be moved to Austin.

In August 2011 Whitmire told the Austin American Statesman that he would bring up the idea of moving the TDCJ headquarters to Austin during the next legislative session. Whitmire argued that while a Huntsville headquarters made sense when all of the prison units were in east and south Texas, since the TDCJ now has facilities around the entire state, the TDCJ headquarters should be consolidated in Austin. Steve Ogden, another state senator, said that a headquarters move is "not going to happen while I'm in office."

== Prison cemetery ==
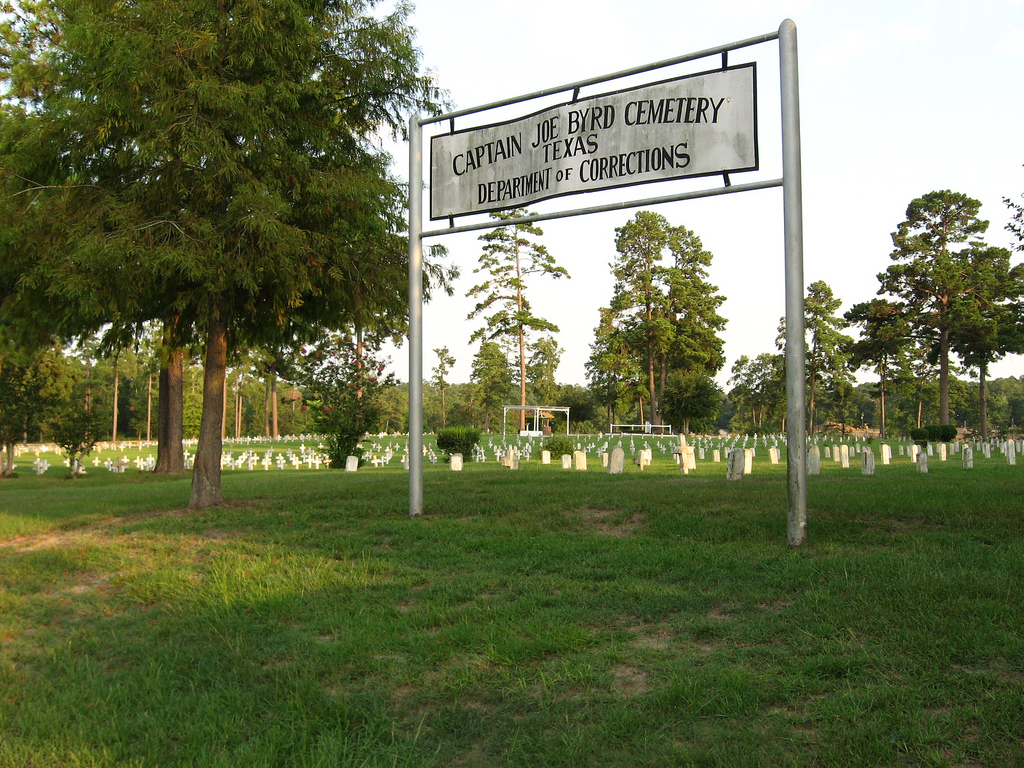
Captain Joe Byrd Cemetery in Huntsville

The Captain Joe Byrd Cemetery, the state's main prison cemetery, is where prisoners not claimed by their families are buried. It is located on 22 acres (8.9 ha) of land on a hill, 1 mile (1.6 km) from the Huntsville Unit and in proximity to Sam Houston State University. It is the largest prison cemetery in Texas. Byrd's first prisoners were interred there in the mid-1800s, and the prison agencies of Texas have maintained the cemetery since then.

== See also ==
- 1974 Huntsville Prison siege
- Texas Juvenile Justice Department
- Texas Youth Commission
- Capital punishment in Texas
- George Beto
- Tom Mechler
- Texas Prison Rodeo

General:

- List of law enforcement agencies in Texas

National:

- List of United States state correction agencies
