= Behind the Walls: A Guide for Families and Friends of Texas Prison Inmates =

2002 book by Jorge Renaud

Behind the Walls: A Guide for Families and Friends of Texas Prison Inmates is a 2002 book by Jorge Renaud, published by University of North Texas Press. It is aimed at relatives and friends of inmates at the Texas Department of Criminal Justice (TDCJ).

== Background ==
Renaud, a prisoner, began writing the book after the prison newspaper he was editing for was closed by the administration. He had been involved in the prison system for at least 25 years.

== Contents ==
The book begins with "A Short History of Texas Prisons," documenting the history of the TDCJ and its predecessor agencies, then has the guide on prison life and operations.

According to Lisa E. Brooks of The Urban Institute, the author describes the TDCJ in "laudably evenhanded" ways, and criticizes both inmates and TDCJ employees. The author explains that there are ethical and unethical people among both groups, and that, in Brooks' words, the "dehumanizing and highly charged prison environment" is the root of problems. The history section describes the agency and its predecessors in a way that, according to Brooks, demonstrates "a long history of corruption and abuse."

The book refers to the Ruiz v. Estelle decision and explains how it altered practices and life in Texas prisons.

== Reception ==
Brooks described the work as an "important contribution". According to Brooks, the guide portions are more "enlightening" than the history section, which she characterized as "vitriolic"; the argued the history portions about Ruiz v. Estelle were also educational.

== See also ==
- In This Timeless Time, a book about the Texas death row for men
- Texas Tough, a book about the Texas prison system
