= Charles Wooten =

American serial killer

- Born: Charles Edward Wooten; 1950 (age 75–76); Hurst, Texas, U.S.
- Convictions: Capital murder Murder with malice (2 counts); Robbery
- Penalty: Life imprisonment

Details
- Victims: 3
- Span of crimes: 1969–1993
- Country: United States
- State: Texas
- Date apprehended: For the final time on August 3, 1993
- Imprisoned at: J. Dale Wainwright Unit, Lovelady, Texas

Charles Edward Wooten (born 1950) is an American serial killer. Initially convicted and sentenced to life for two separate murders committed around Fort Worth, Texas in 1969, he was paroled in May 1992 thanks to campaigning from his father, Arlis, whom Wooten would kill during an argument in July 1993. Wooten was later convicted of this murder and given another life term.

== Murders ==
=== First murders ===
In April 1969, Wooten, then imprisoned on a 5-year prison sentence for armed robbery, was paroled after serving only 18 months. On September 1, he and an unnamed 16-year-old accomplice went to a gas station on the North Side of Fort Worth, where they kidnapped and later shot the 58-year-old attendant, Loyd Dewey Choat. A few days later, the man's body was found in a creekbed near Watauga. According to one sheriff's suspicions, the killer might have brought two teenage girls to view Choat's body, but the reason for this belief was never established. Later that month, police brought murder charges 18-year-old Stephen James Duffy and 21-year-old Henry W. Baldwin, as it was initially believed that they were the ones responsible for the killing.

On November 6, the day of Wooten's bachelor party, he, along with his 18-year-old brother-in-law Michael Wayne Bush and 17-year-old Gerald Ross Weatherly, decided that they would rob a local gas station attendant working the night shift, a 26-year-old man by the name of David Daniels. The day after, the trio entered the gas station and robbed it, with Wooten stabbing Daniels 36 times before fleeing. Both Choat and Daniels' murders were initially thought to be unconnected, until shortly after Wooten's arrest on December 20, when he was caught after attempting to rob a grocery store where his father, Arlis "Edward" Wooten, worked as an assistant manager. By the end of the month, the underage accomplice implicated him in the Choat murder, which was quickly followed up by Bush and Weatherly, who in turn implicated him in the Daniels' killing. As a result, Wooten was held without bond on two counts of capital murder, with the charges levelled against Duffy and Baldwin being subsequently dropped.

While awaiting trial, Wooten claimed that he had shot a young blonde woman three times as she was exiting a bathroom, but claimed that he was unable to remember neither the date or location of where this supposed crime had occurred. The sheriff presiding over his detention, Lon Evans, nonetheless contacted sheriffs and police departments all around the area, none of which reported having a crime with such characteristics. As a result, this supposed "confession" of Wooten's was considered a hoax and ignored. On May 26, 1970, in the middle of his trial, Wooten pleaded guilty to both murders in a bid to avoid the death penalty, which had been sought by the district attorney. As a result, he was convicted and sentenced to two consecutive life terms, which were stacked with another life sentence amassed from his guilty plea to the grocery store robbery in December 1969.

=== Patricide ===
After Wooten's incarceration, his father conducted a series of highly publicized interviews with the Fort Worth Star-Telegram, in which he claimed that his son had told him that he had been "haunted [...] by dreams of murder and mayhem." Over the subsequent 23 years, the elder Wooten would repeatedly write letters to the parole board, begging them to consider him for parole. During his imprisonment, Wooten earned a master's degree in humanities and became a skilled leather worker, whose crafts were sold by the proprietor of a grocery store. He also steadfastly denied any guilt in the murders, claiming that he had been framed.

In May 1992, Wooten was finally paroled and moved into his father's apartment in Azle. Shortly after his release, Wooten's father found him a job as a carpet cleaner and leather craftsman, and for some time, he appeared to be slowly rehabilitating. However, on July 29, 1993, Charles and Arlis got into an argument, resulting in the former shooting the latter in the head, before dismembering the body and driving to a field outside of town, where he set the remains on fire. The elder Wooten's disappearance was reported to police by one of his other sons a few days later, and after searching through the shrubbery, authorities located a set of four charred, scattered limbs which were tentatively identified as belonging to Arlis Wooten. A report later emerged that a youth who lived in the area had told his mother that he had seen a man putting what appeared to be a body in the back of his trunk, but this was dismissed by her at the time.

== Arrest, trial and imprisonment ==
Charles was arrested as a suspect in the murder on August 3 and held on $100,000, together with two alleged accomplices, 41-year-old Titus Henry Hill and 24-year-old Michelle Ann Matl. When he was brought to the crime scene as part of a routine inspection, investigators reported that he had no visible emotion during the entirety of the procedure. At his murder trial in June 1995, prosecutors claimed that the reason for the murder was that Wooten had wanted to collect his father's life insurance. However, they did not have sufficient evidence to prove this claim. Wooten later pleaded guilty to capital murder in exchange for a life sentence with parole eligibility after 35 years. This outcome came as a disappointment to most of his family members, who wanted him sentenced to death for their father's murder.

As of June 2023, Wooten remains incarcerated at the J. Dale Wainwright Unit in Lovelady. He will become eligible for parole in 2028.

== See also ==
- List of serial killers in the United States
- Joseph Ernest Atkins
