= Thomas Goree Unit =

Men's prison in Huntsville, Texas

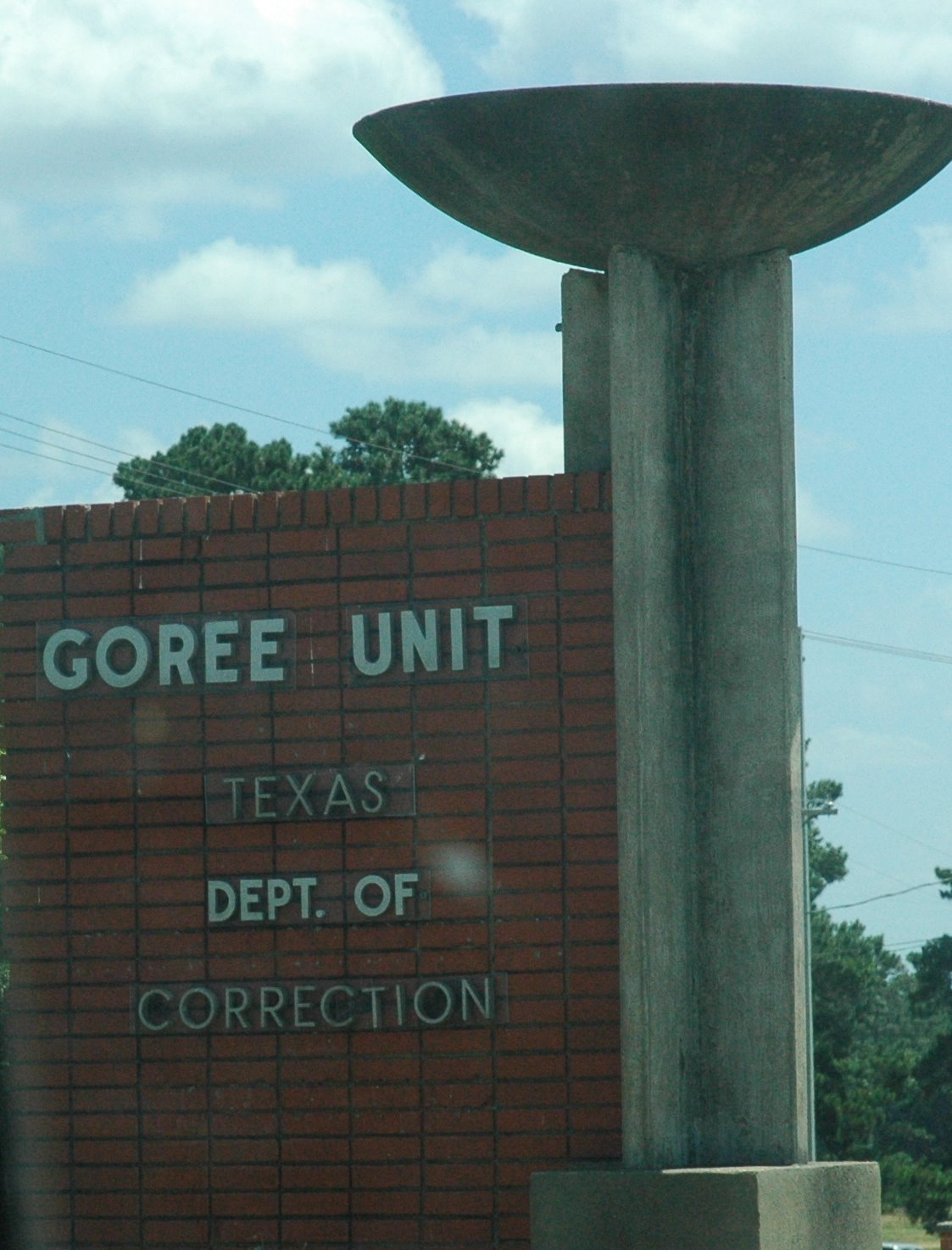

- Location in Texas
- Location: Huntsville, Texas; 30°40′26″N 95°30′55″W
- Status: Operational
- Security class: G1–G3]{, Administrative Segregation, Outside Trusty, Transient
- Capacity: Unit: 1000 Trusty Camp: 321
- Opened: 1907
- Managed by: TDCJ Correctional Institutions Division
- Warden: Cynthia Tilley
- Website: www.tdcj.state.tx.us/unit_directory../gr.html

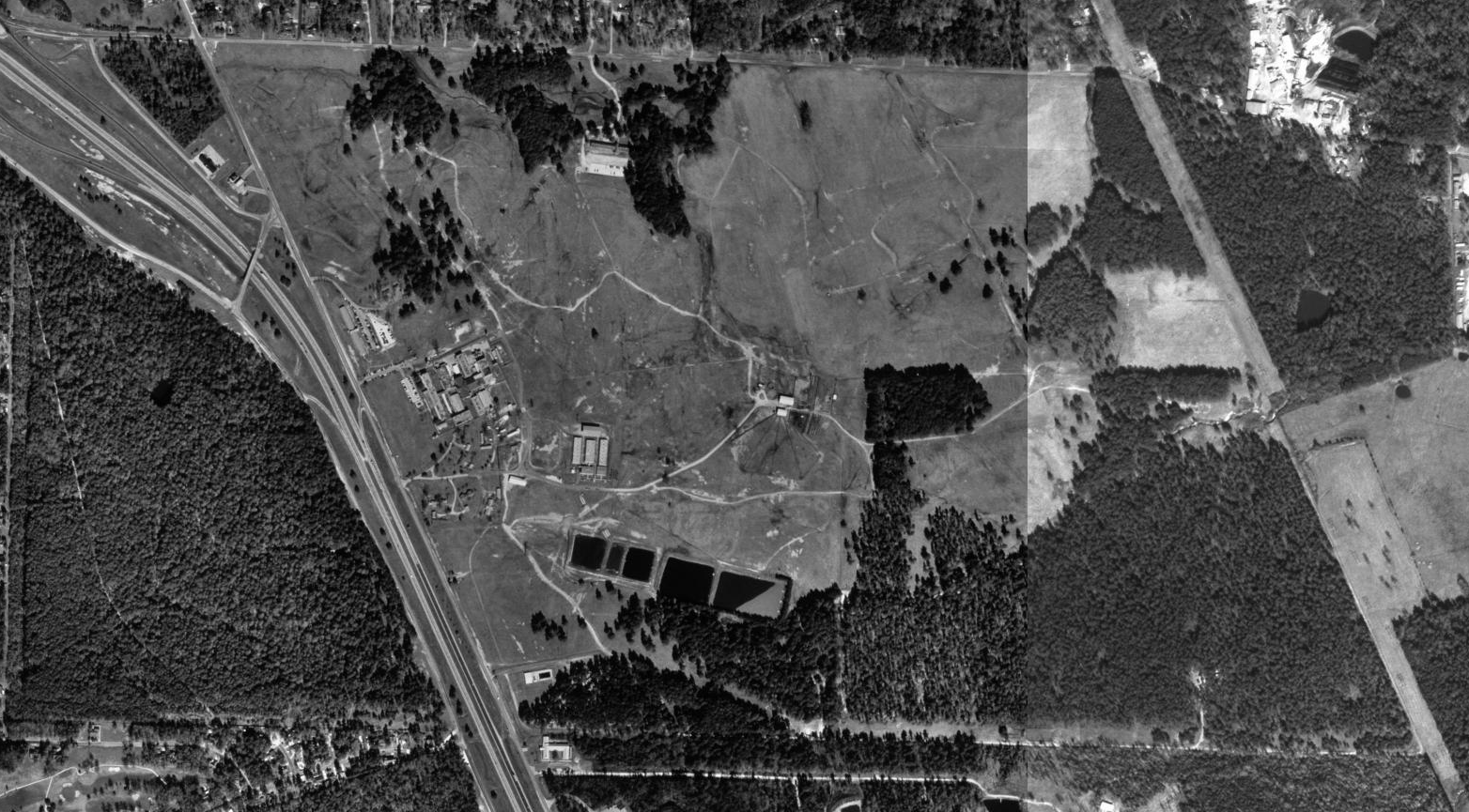
Aerial photograph of the Goree Unit, January 23, 1995, U.S. Geological Survey

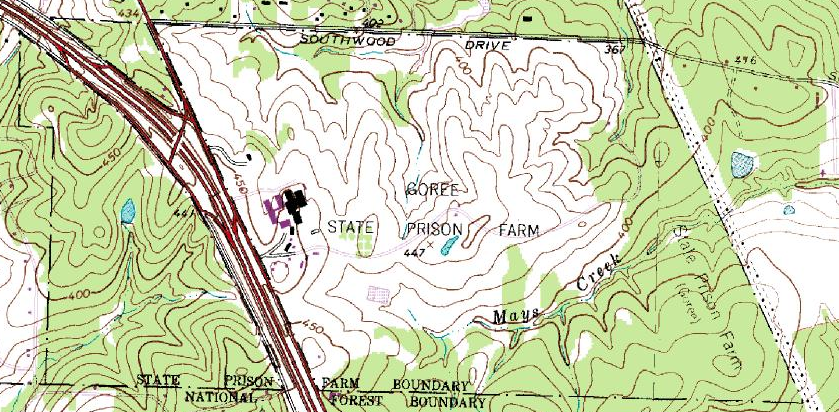
Topographical map of the Goree Unit, July 1, 1976, U.S. Geological Survey

The Thomas Goree Unit (GR) is a Texas Department of Criminal Justice men's prison, located in Huntsville, Texas, 4 miles (6.4 km) south of downtown Huntsville on Texas State Highway 75 South. The Goree Unit is located within Region I. First opened in 1911, it served as the only women's correctional facility in Texas until 1982, after the women were moved to state prisons in Gatesville. For a period Goree held the state's sole female death row inmate, until her conviction was changed to a non-capital offense. There was more than one death row female at Goree in 1979.

== History ==
The unit was named after Major Thomas J. Goree, who, in the late 19th century, served as a prison superintendent. The unit was first established in 1907, and it opened in 1911 as the Goree State Farm for Women, a women's prison. The facility had separate portions for White and African-American women. White and Hispanic women worked in the garment factory, while Black women worked in the fields.

In the 1930s Goree included the main building, separate sets of dormitories for black and white prisoners, an orchard, a cannery, a barn, crop fields, a hen house, and a cemetery for prisoners who had not been taken by surviving relatives. The dormitories had bars bolted onto the windows. During that decade, 150 prisoners resided at Goree. The Goree All Girl String Band, a group of prisoners from the unit, performed in the 1940s.

Goree, within a short driving distance from the Texas Department of Criminal Justice headquarters, had been rebuilt and expanded during the administrations of O. B. Ellis and George Beto. Robert Perkinson, author of Texas Tough: The Rise of America's Prison Empire, said that Goree's main building "showcases a bygone nod to rehabilitation." The main building has dormitories which face gardens. Instead of bars, the residential rooms use decorative latticework. A visitor stated that Goree appeared "more or less like a college dormitory."

On one occasion Goree held a female death row prisoner, Mary Anderson, Texas Department of Corrections (TDC)# 607. Anderson was sentenced to death on October 31, 1978, but her death sentence was reversed in 1982. The sentence was changed to murder and Anderson, who received a 50-year sentence, became TDC#285253. She was paroled on January 14, 1991.

In the 1980s the state moved women prisoners to facilities in Gatesville. In 1982 Goree was converted into a men's prison. The prison authorities placed wire mesh on the dormitory windows. Prisoners are not permitted to be in the gardens. The prison gained a single perimeter fence with concertina wire; previously the area was unfenced.

== Inmates ==
Male:

- David Ruíz (plaintiff of Ruiz v. Estelle)

Female:

- Candy Barr
- Goree All Girl String Band
