= Texas Prison Rodeo =

Annual celebration in the Texas Prison System

The Texas Prison Rodeo was a rodeo and an annual celebration event for inmates in the Texas Prison System, held in a stadium in Huntsville, Texas. The stadium was located at the Huntsville Unit. The events included bareback basketball, bronco riding, bull riding, calf roping, and wild cow milking.

Marshall Lee Simmons, the general manager of the prison system, started the rodeo in 1931. The rodeo originated in the Eastham Unit. Johnny Cash played his first-ever concert at the Texas Prison Rodeo in 1956. Women participated in the rodeo until 1981, when they were moved from the Goree Unit in Huntsville to the prisons in Gatesville. In 1986, structural problems with the rodeo arena caused the facility to close. The rodeo ended because the state began getting money from the federal government for educational and recreational programs for the inmates. Texas no longer needed to raise money to buy educational and recreational materials. The state had been suffering from an economic recession, and the Texas Legislature was not willing to spend $500,000 to repair stadium bleachers and other infrastructures. Several unsuccessful attempts to restart the rodeo occurred in the 1990s.

The rodeo became part of the history of the US space program, when during the training for the 1975 Apollo–Soyuz mission, NASA brought the cosmonauts in training, along with other Soviet personnel, to the Huntsville rodeo.

The rodeo was featured in the 1980 film Urban Cowboy starring John Travolta, Debra Winger, and Scott Glenn.

== See also ==
- Goree All Girl String Band
- Oklahoma State Penitentiary § Prison rodeo
