= Goree All Girl String Band =

Prison band in Huntsville, Texas, US

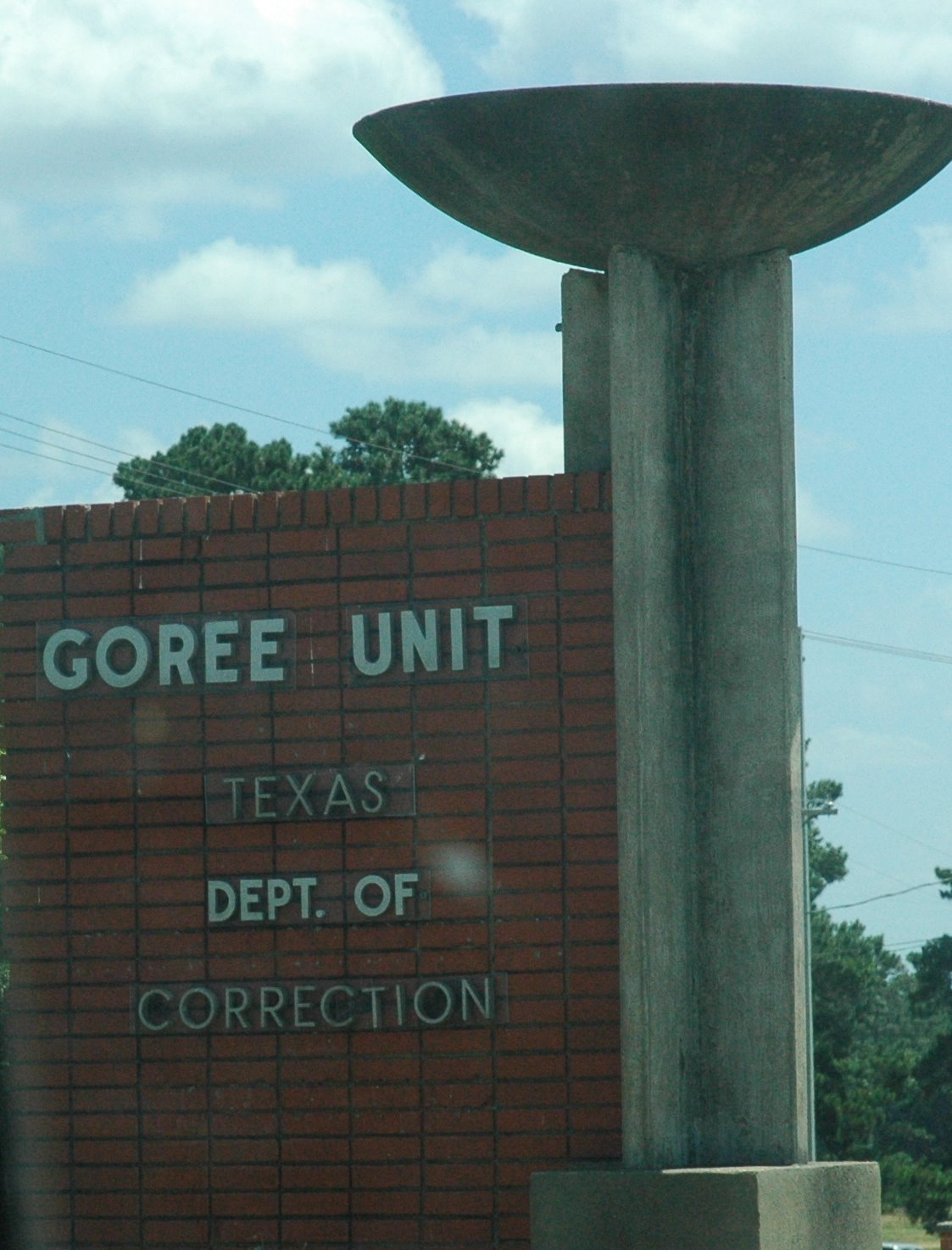
Goree Unit, where the members were incarcerated

The Goree All Girl String Band, popularly known as The Goree Girls, was a band of eight female prisoners of the Goree Unit which performed in the 1940s. It was one of the first all female country and western bands in the United States.

== History ==
In the 1930s, while Thirty Minutes Behind the Walls, a musical show involving prisoners from Huntsville Unit played on radio waves, one Goree Unit prisoner, Reable Childs, suggested starting a band consisting of women from the Goree Unit. Of the original members, Mozelle McDaniel and Ruby Mae Morace served as the main singers. Georgia Fay Collins, Ruby Dell Guyton, and Bonnie Scott played the acoustic guitar. Lillie Mae Dudley played the bass fiddle. Childs played the banjo and the steel guitar. The band held its debut on July 10, 1940 at the Huntsville Unit. Three months later, the prison system asked them to be the intermission singers at the Texas Prison Rodeo.

The band performed on Wednesday evenings in an auditorium in Huntsville and its music was played on WBAP, a radio station in Fort Worth. The band had fans throughout the United States and they received mail, gifts, and marriage proposals from fans. Band members had been convicted of crimes like cattle rustling, murder, robbery, and theft. Skip Hollandsworth of Texas Monthly said that music historians do not pay attention to the band since the band never made a record and it never went on a national tour.

The band changed when its members were paroled. Hollandsworth said "The Goree Girls were on the verge of becoming genuine celebrities—as long as they stayed in prison. But conceivably, the reason that they had started the band was to receive early parole and leave. They may have been the only band in musical history that set out to gain attention in order to disappear." As members left, the prison system found other prisoners to replace them. McDaniel was the first member of the group to leave. In the spring of 1942, Morace was paroled. Reable was paroled in October 1943, and Collins replaced her as the group's leader. Since the founder and most notable member of the group was gone, WBAP paid less attention to the group. Attention from the public further decreased as Americans tuned in to radio programs about soldiers in World War II. The radio program Thirty Minutes Behind the Walls ended in 1944. Hollandsworth said that the radio show had ended "quietly." As of 1947 women under the name "Goree Girls" had performed at the prison rodeo.

The women never reunited to make reunion appearances on the radio or at the prison rodeo. McDaniel was the last known surviving member of the band. At a time before May 2003, McDaniel, then known as Mozelle Cash, died from a heart attack, induced by choking on food, while in a nursing home in Tyler, Texas. McDaniel's burial site is in the Pines Cemetery, south of Tyler. McDaniel's obituary refers to her as "Mozelle Cash." Her nephew stated that she did not want to be listed as "Mozelle McDaniel Cash" in her obituary because "[s]he thought it was best that no one remember."

== In other media ==
A film with Jennifer Aniston, The Goree Girls, about the band was reported in 2009 as upcoming.
