= School of Letters =

School of Letters logo from the 1972 (final year of the School) brochure.

The School of Letters was a summer institute and degree-granting (M.A. and Ph.D. minor) program at Indiana University Bloomington. The school moved from Kenyon College in 1951 following the withdrawal of funding of the School of English by the Rockefeller Foundation. Indiana University President Herman B. Wells obtained funding from the university and located the school under the administration of Dean John W. Ashton of the College of Arts and Sciences. The school opened under the direction of Professor Richard B. Hudson and then transitioned to Prof. Newton P. 'Stalky' Stallknecht until his retirement and the school's dissolution in 1972.

== Founding ==
When Indiana University moved the school from Kenyon to Bloomington they maintained John Crowe Ransom, Lionel Trilling, Philip Rahv, Austin Warren, and Allen Tate as senior fellows, all well-known literary scholars. The Kenyon School of English was founded by three senior fellows, John Crowe Ransom, F. O. Matthiessen and Lionel Trilling and was held during a summer session at Kenyon College from 1948 until 1950. The first session of the School of Letters in Bloomington ran from June 21 to August 1, 1951.

== Mission statement ==
The educational policy of the School turns on the belief that the usual college and university courses in English have not discharged their responsibility for the art which is in their keeping…They expend very nearly their entire energy upon disciplines which are philological, historical, biographical, and ideological…able students are not being trained, and perhaps not even being encouraged, to form literary judgments.

In 1954, this statement needs from correction, in part perhaps because of the School’s success; in part, too, because the School was symptom as well as cause. Departments of English have increasingly recognized, and officially provided for, the critical study of literature. More students are drawn to it, and they meet with increasing tolerance and even encouragement.

Insistence upon high standards is not to be understood as commitment to some particular doctrine of criticism. As defined by its aims and exemplified in its history, the School represents various modes of contemporary theory and practice. It hopes for that free and responsible diversity, on the part of students and teachers, from which may develop a rich and inclusive synthesis.

== The school's impact ==
Students at the School of Letters included James M. Cox 1951 (later would become a faculty member at Indiana University and the School), Martha Banta 1962, Bruce Jackson 1962, Paul Lauter 1955, and Geoffrey H. Hartman 1951. The School existed during a period of major change within the field of literary studies from the dominance of New Criticism until the rise of post-structuralism. During each session of the School high-profile academics, poets, and critics were brought to Bloomington to teach seminars and deliver weekly forum lectures. These instructors included Northrop Frye, William Empson, John Berryman, Robert Lowell, Leslie Fiedler, and R. P. Blackmur.
