= In This Timeless Time =

2012 book by Jackson and Christian

- First edition
- Author: Bruce Jackson, Diana Christian
- Language: English
- Genre: Non-fiction
- Publisher: University of North Carolina Press
- Publication date: 2012
- Publication place: United States

In This Timeless Time: Living and Dying on Death Row in America is a 2012 book by Bruce Jackson and Diana Christian, published by the University of North Carolina Press.

== Background ==
The authors are married to one another and Helicher had previously studied prisons for around 40 years. They did not have formal work experience in criminology and history-related jobs.

The title "timeless time" refers to a saying of how staying on death row feels like, as the prisoners are not aware of their ultimate fate.

The authors previously created the documentary film Death Row.

== Contents ==
The initial section is a memorial to executed prisoners, reflecting the authors' philosophy opposing the death penalty.

The book has three sections. The first includes photographs of condemned inmates, in the Ellis Unit in Walker County, Texas in 1979. Those inmates had been put to death. Alan G. Pike of Emory University wrote that the death row living situation is "monotonous and oppressive". The book has a total of 113 black-and-white photographs, all in duotone, and twelve inmates were depicted. The photographs make up most of the work.

The second, "Words", discusses the legal processes, the outcomes, and daily lives of death row inmates. This section serves as the captions to the images of the first.

The third, "Working", discusses the processes the authors used to get their research material, and ethics-based arguments regarding the death penalty.

The book includes a DVD containing a 1979 documentary, Death Row, including interviews of Ellis Unit capital punishment prisoners, made by the authors. Pike called it "exceptional".

== Reception ==
Frances Sandiford, a former librarian of the Green Haven Correctional Facility, wrote that the book was in a "direct, journalistic style, poignant and to the point." She indicated a highly positive review with a star symbol.

Pike wrote that the book is "a uniquely powerful contribution" to the subject and that it has "compelling" components.

Karl Helicher of ForeWord wrote that the book "would benefit" persons interested in the American death penalty and the associated penal system.

Alex Tepperman, a PhD student in history at the University of Florida, concluded that the book "is a moving piece of photojournalism and a fitting argument against the death penalty". Tepperman believed the first part was the best but felt the second and third were not as good.

Publishers Weekly wrote that the book was "comprehensive" and "well-crafted". PW stated that overall the book "raises important questions" about the death penalty and the legal system; the review criticized how there are multiple photographs of different angles of the same events and general repetition at times.

== See also ==
- Behind the Walls: A Guide for Families and Friends of Texas Prison Inmates - Guide to the Texas prison system written by a prisoner
- Texas Tough - Book about the Texas prison system

== References and notes ==
=== References ===
- Helicher, Karl (2012-05-31). "In This Timeless Time". ForeWord.
- Pike, Alan G. (November 2012). "In This Timeless Time: Living and Dying on Death Row in America". Journal of Southern History. 78 (4): 1060–1061. JSTOR 23795726. - PDF pages 12-13/17
- Sandiford, Frances (2012-05-15). "In This Timeless Time: Living and Dying on Death Row in America". Library Journal: 89–90.
- Tepperman, Alex (Spring 2013). "In This Timeless Time: Living and Dying on Death Row in America". Texas Books in Review: 3.
