= J. Dale Wainwright Unit =

Texas penitentiary

Wainwright Unit
- Location in Texas
- Location: 2665 Jovian Motley Boulevard Lovelady, Texas 75851; 30°58′39″N 95°37′57″W
- Status: Operational
- Security class: G1-G4, Administrative Segregation, Outside Trusty, Transient
- Capacity: Unit: 2,153 Trusty Camp: 321
- Opened: April 1917
- Former name: Eastham Unit
- Managed by: TDCJ Correctional Institutions Division
- Warden: Donald Muniz
- Website: www.tdcj.state.tx.us/unit_directory/ea.html

The J. Dale Wainwright Unit is a Texas Department of Criminal Justice (TDCJ) prison for men, located in unincorporated Houston County, Texas. Formerly called the Eastham Unit or "The Ham," the prison was renamed the J. Dale Wainwright Unit after a former chairman of the Texas Board of Criminal Justice. The 12,789 acres (5,176 ha) prison is located on Farm to Market Road 230, near Lovelady and 13 miles (21 km) west of Trinity.

Robert Perkinson, author of Texas Tough: The Rise of America's Prison Empire, said that while the TDCJ and other agencies operate many types of prisons and jails in Texas, "if any unit stands for the rest," it would be Eastham.

== History ==
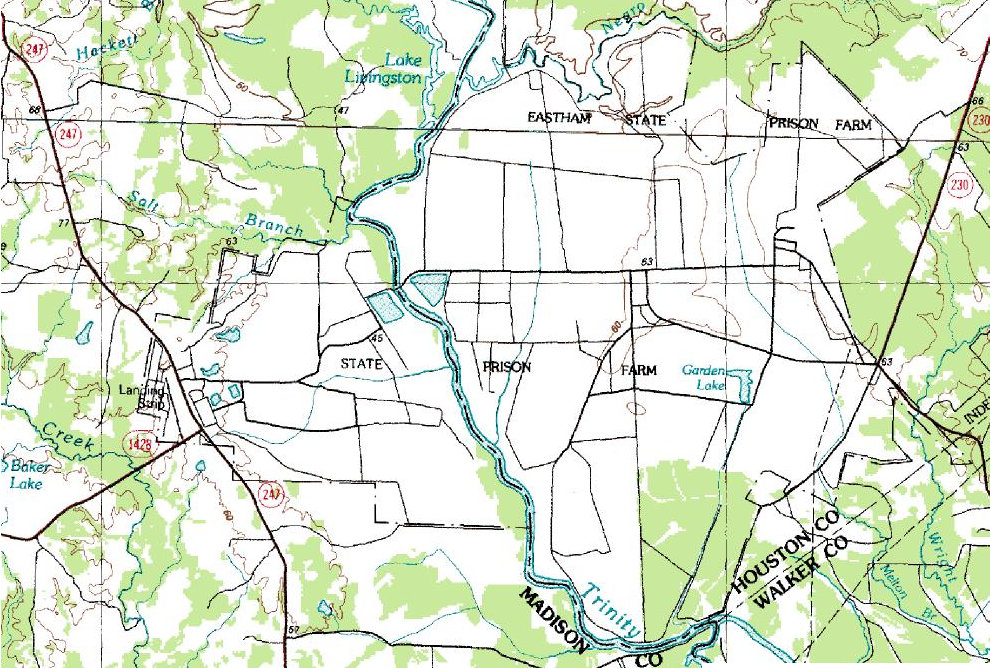
Topographic maps of the Eastham Unit and the Ferguson Unit, July 1983 - U.S. Geological Survey

Before the American Civil War, the land now making up Eastham was cleared by enslaved people. After the civil war, sharecroppers originally worked the land. The sharecroppers were replaced by prisoners under a convict leasing program. In 1896, Mrs. D. Eastham agreed to pay $14.50 per month per person for 119 convicted men, including many African-Americans. The Eastham Unit opened in April 1917, becoming the first maximum security prison in Texas.

It was named after the Eastham Family, the original owners of the land occupied by the prison. Throughout Eastham's history, many prisoners dreaded being sent to Eastham because of the arduous work assignments, the dangerous conditions, and the difficulty of escaping the unit. Many crackdowns and work strikes occurred during the unit's history. Throughout its history Eastham housed maximum security male prisoners and made them work in the fields.

In the early twentieth century Eastham housed female prisoners. After a sexual abuse scandal occurred, the Texas Prison System administrators moved the women to be closer to Huntsville, and Eastham began housing men. It was during this period, from April 1930 to May 1932, that Clyde Barrow, later ringleader of the infamous Bonnie and Clyde criminal gang, spent his first ever period of incarceration for burglary and auto theft.

Eastham was the starting point of the Texas Prison Rodeo, which began in 1931. On January 16, 1934, Clyde Barrow freed five prisoners from the unit. At a later point Eastham specialized in housing young offenders; at first the young offenders were White, but after the facilities aged the state sent Black young offenders to Eastham. In 1935 Eastham housed White prisoners. In 1963, before racial desegregation occurred, the facility housed White prisoners who were classified as mostly maximum security inmates.

On March 29, 1966, two inmates, Ronnie Lee Barlow, 20, serving a life sentence for murder from San Saba County, and Gerald Doudlag Lackey, 20, serving six years for burglary from Lubbock County, escaped during the night after hiding under brush that had been cut that day. They severely beat a Houston County dairy farmer and his son, stealing guns and a car to further their escape. The injured farmer recovered from head wounds in Crockett Medical and Surgical Clinic. His elder son was sent to Methodist Hospital in Houston, where he was treated for severe head injuries caused by blows to the head with a hatchet and a length of pipe. Highway Patrolman Paul Bruno, who was stationed in Huntsville captured two escaped inmates of the Eastham Unit TDC as they were entering I-45 heading to Dallas.

In 1972 prisoners at Eastham filed Ruiz v. Estelle, a class action lawsuit against the Texas Department of Corrections (TDC), as the TDCJ was then known, and won. In 1979 the court found conditions of imprisonment within the TDC prison system constituted cruel and unusual punishment in violation of the United States Constitution. While there were many names included in the lawsuit, David Ruiz was the first name listed and that is how the case was titled.

As an outbreak of stabbings occurred, an October 1986 Newsweek magazine had a cover story on Eastham with title "America's Toughest Prison. In 1984 several prisoners short-circuited the locks on their cells and held a guard hostage. The crisis ended when prison guards attacked the cell block. In October 2000 David Stacks became the warden of Eastham; he introduced several voluntary rehabilitation programs to the unit.

Robert Perkinson, author of Texas Tough: The Rise of America's Prison Empire, said by 2010 Eastham's reputation had mellowed mainly because of the opening of newer units with more stringent rules, such as the Polunsky Unit. The TDCJ stated in 2006 that Stacks's programs "helped rid Eastham of its once rugged reputation." As of 2010, the prison's agricultural operation, described by Perkinson as "massive," has 4,000 head of free-range cattle, 52,000 laying hens, 5,000 hogs, and 1,400 acres (570 ha) of field crops. The operation is maintained with 11 paid employees and prisoner labor.

In 2011 the Jester III Unit garment plant closed. Its operations were consolidated with the plant at Eastham.

== Operations ==
Perkinson wrote that while the TDCJ and other agencies operate many types of prisons and jails in Texas, "if any unit stands for the rest," it would be Eastham. Perkinson added that Eastham "typifies the rural isolation of most Texas lockups" and "binds present-day prisons to their unburied past." Eastham, a cotton plantation, houses all prisoner classification types but has an emphasis on maximum security incarceration. The prison had many forms and purposes during its lifetime, and ruins, such as a cell block and a former textile mill, are on the prison grounds.

Throughout its history, the institution's goals were to profit from annual cotton harvests and to discipline prisoners who did not work sufficiently to produce the harvests. Walter Siros, a man who was sent to Eastham in 1960, described the institutional rule as "murderous." Perkinson said that Eastham's "continuities were striking" and that the prison's daily rhythms, which originated from the 19th century, "scarcely changed." Perkinson said that Eastham's history suggests that the harshest elements of imprisonment in 2010 had origins in previous eras, and that Eastham stymies contemporary criminal justice analysts who focus on recent trends instead of continuities.

== Composition ==
The main prison building, a red-brick structure, was constructed by inmate labor. The building has a "telephone pole" layout with central pickets with dead-end cell blocks extending from them. The layout is very difficult to patrol and control, so historically the prison management used "building tenders," who were prisoners charged with watching the areas of Eastham.

Eastham has employee housing. The children of the employees living on the prison property attend the Lovelady Independent School District.

== Demographics ==
As of 2010, most of the prisoners at Eastham are African-Americans and Chicanos who originate from urban areas in Texas. For many of them, their assignments to Eastham are the first times that they have ever been on a farm property.

== Notable inmates ==
- Clyde Barrow
- Roy Renick, perpetrator of the murders of John Goosey and Stacy Barnett.
- David Ruíz (plaintiff of Ruiz v. Estelle)
- Keith Robert Turner - perpetrator of the 2006 Harris County, Texas hate crime assault

== Bibliography ==
- Guinn, Jeff. Go Down Together: The True, Untold Story of Bonnie and Clyde. (New York: Simon & Schuster, 2009.) ISBN 1-4165-5706-7.
