= Bruce Jackson (scholar) =

American scholar

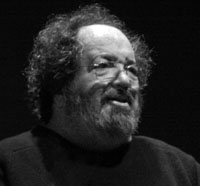
- Born: May 21, 1936 (age 90); Brooklyn, New York
- Occupations: SUNY Distinguished Professor; James Agee Professor of American Culture, documentary film maker, photographer
- Employer: University at Buffalo

Bruce Jackson (born May 21, 1936) is an American folklorist, documentary filmmaker, writer, photographer. He is SUNY Distinguished Professor and the James Agee Professor of American Culture at the University at Buffalo. Jackson has edited or authored books published by major trade and university presses. He has also directed and produced five documentary films. He is an Associate Member of The Wooster Group (New York).

== Biography ==
Jackson was born in Brooklyn, New York in 1936. He served in the United States Marine Corps from 1953–1956, then attended Newark College of Engineering (now New Jersey Institute of Technology) for three years. He received a B.A. from Rutgers University in 1960 and an M.A. from Indiana University's School of Letters in 1962. From 1963 through 1967 he was a Junior Fellow in Harvard University's Society of Fellows.

He has been the recipient of a Guggenheim Fellowship (1971), was nominated for a Grammy Award (1974) for Best Ethnic Traditional Recording (Wake Up Dead Man: Black Convict Work Songs), named an Associate Member of the Folklore Fellows by the Finnish Academy of Science and Letters (1995), and Chevalier in l'Ordre des Arts et des Lettres by the French government (2002). In 2012, the president of France appointed him chevalier in the National Order of Merit. He was president of the American Folklore Society in 1984. He was also chairman of the board of trustees of the American Folklore Center in the Library of Congress (1988–89, trustee 1984-89), and director, then trustee of the Newport Folk Foundation (1965—).

With Diane Christian, he has directed and produced five documentary films: Death Row (1979), Robert Creeley: Willy's Reading (1982), William August May (1982), Out of Order (1983), and Creeley (1988).

In 2017, The Wooster Group produced a play based on his 1964 recordings in Texas prisons: "The B-Side: 'Negro Folklore from Texas State Prisons' A Record Album Interpretation." The play has since been performed in Taipei, Gwanju (Korea(, Buffalo, Los Angeles and Brooklyn. In 2024, the Wooster Group produced a play based on his 1974 book and 1975 LP, "Get Your Ass in the Water and Swim Like Me."

His photographs mainly focus on prison life. A photo collection from the Cummins Unit in Arkansas was exhibited at the Albright-Knox Art Gallery and at the Center for Documentary Studies at Duke University. Other recent exhibitions are Being There (Burchfield Penney Art Center, 2012), Portraits from a Prison (Arkansas Studies Institute, 2009), American Gulag (Lega di Cultura di Piadena and Circolo Gianni Bosio, Rome, 2007), Bridging Buffalo (Buffalo and Erie County Historical Society, 2006–2007), and Mirrors (Nina Freudenheim Gallery, 2004).

His work has been funded by the National Endowment for the Arts, National Endowment for the Humanities, Fund for Investigative Journalism, Playboy Foundation, Levi Strauss Foundation, Polaroid Foundation, New York Council for the Humanities and the American Philosophical Society.

He has spent his academic career at the University at Buffalo. He joined it as an assistant professor of English and comparative literature in 1967, was promoted to associate professor a year later and to full professor in 1971. He received the SUNY Distinguished Professor distinction in 1990 and was appointed Samuel P. Capen Professor of American Culture in 1997. In 2009, he was appointed James Agee Professor of American Culture. From 2015 to 2021, he was co-director of University at Buffalo's Creative Arts Initiative.

From 1986 to 1990, Jackson was editor-in-chief of the Journal of American Folklore.

== Filmography ==
- Death Row (1979)
- Robert Creeley: Willy's Reading (1982)
- William August May (1982)
- Out of Order (1983)
- Creeley (1988)

== Published works ==
- Folklore and Society (ed., Folklore Associates, 1966)
- The Negro and his Folklore in 19th Century Periodicals (ed., American Folklore Society and University of Texas Press, 1967)
- A Thief's Primer (Macmillan, 1969)
- In the Life: Versions of the Criminal Experience (Holt, Rinehart and Winston, 1972)
- Wake Up Dead Man: Afro-American Worksongs from Texas Prisons (Harvard University Press, 1972)
- "Get Your Ass in the Water and Swim Like Me": Narrative Poetry from Black Oral Tradition (Harvard University Press, 1974)
- Killing Time: Life in the Arkansas Penitentiary (photographs. Cornell University Press, 1977)
- The Programmer (novel, Doubleday, 1979)
- Death Row (with Diane Christian, Beacon Press, 1980)
- Get the Money and Shoot: The DRI Guide to Funding Documentary Films (Documentary Research, 1981)
- Your Father's Not Coming Home Any More (ed., Richard Marek/ Putnam's, 1981)
- Doing Drugs (with Michael Jackson, St. Martin's, 1983)
- Teaching Folklore (ed., American Folklore Society and Documentary Research, 1984)
- Law and Disorder: Criminal Justice in America (University of Illinois Press, 1985)
- Rainbow Freeware (New South Moulton Press, 1986)
- Fieldwork (University of Illinois Press, 1987)
- A User's Guide: Freeware, Shareware, and Public Domain Software (New South Moulton Press, 1988)
- Disorderly Conduct (political and social essays), 1992, University of Illinois Press)
- The World Observed: Reflections on the Fieldwork Process (co-editor, with Edward D. Ives, University of Illinois Press, 1996)
- The Story is True: The Art and Meaning of Telling Stories (Temple University Press, 2007)
- Pictures from a Drawer: Prison and the Art of Portraiture (Temple University Press, 2009)
- In This Timeless Time: Living and Dying on Death Row in America (University of North Carolina Press, 2012, with Diane Christian)
- "Inside the Wire: Photographs from Texas and Arkansas Prisons" (University of Texas Press, 2013)
- "Being There: Bruce Jackson, Photographs, 1962-2012" (Burchfield-Penney Art Center, 2013)
- "Inside the Wire: Photographs from Texas and Arkansas Prisons" (University of Texas Press, 2013)
- "American Chartres: Buffalo's Waterfront Grain Elevators" (SUNY Press, 2016)
- "Terlingua Necropolis" (Synergistic Press 2017)
- "I Look at Diane Christian/Diane Christian looks at Me. Photographs 1971-2017" (Synergistic Press)
- "Babel: The First Ten Years," (Just Buffalo, 2018, ed. by Barbara Cole)
- "Places: Things heard, things seen" (BlazeVox 2019)
- Yevtushenko in Buffalo (with Tanya Shalina-Conte), (Center Working Papers, 2020)
- Deux jours à La Ribaute: A Celebration at Atelier Anselm Kiefer (Room With a View Press, 2020)
- Robert Creeley on the Poet's Work. In Conversation with Bruce Jackson (BlazeVox, 2020)
- Changing Tense: Thirty memento mori (BlazeVox, 2021)
- Voices from Death Row, second edition (with Diane Christian) (Sony Press, 2022)
- Ways of the Hand: A Photographer's Memoir (SUNY Press, 2022)
- The Story is True. Expanded edition (SUNY Press, 2022)
- Ephemera 1995-2022: On people, politics, art, justice, torture and war (BlazeVox, 2023)
- Get Your Ass in the Water and Swim Like Me, revised ed. (SUNY Press, 2024)
- Folklore Matters: Incursions in the Field 1965-2021 (SUNY Press, 2024)
- The Life and Death of Buffalo's Great Northern Grain Elevator: 1897-2023 (SUNY Press, 2024)
