= Robert Perkinson =

American historian

Robert Perkinson is an American historian and Associate Professor of American Studies at the University of Hawaiʻi at Mānoa. He is the author of Texas Tough: The Rise of a Prison Empire (2010) which received the 2011 PEN/John Kenneth Galbraith Award.

== Education and academic career ==
Perkinson attended Jackson Hole High School in Jackson, Wyoming and graduated with honors in 1987. Between 1985 and 1986, he participated in International Student Exchange at the Colegio Concepcion in Concepcion, Chile. At the University of Colorado at Boulder, Perkinson received his Bachelor of Arts with honors in History, with a minor in Ethnic Studies in 1994. He attended Yale University and earned his Master of Arts and Ph.D. in American Studies, where he also co-founded the Student Legal Action Movement. His dissertation is titled The Birth of the Texas Prison Empire, 1865-1915. He also served as a political columnist for the Boulder Weekly and editorial assistant for Critical Asian Studies in Boulder, Colorado.

Perkinson joined the American Studies department at the University of Hawaiʻi at Mānoa in 2001. He teaches graduate and undergraduate courses in areas such as crime and punishment, Southern and Western history, race and class, and American empire.

His book, Texas Tough, addresses the history of American punishment, race, economy, and politics in the United States, with an emphasis on Texas—the most locked down state in the United States. The book was reviewed in many publications including The New York Times, The New Republic, Columbia Journalism Review, and Boston Globe.

In 2014, he was involved with the State of Hawai‘i's and the University of Hawaiʻi at Mānoa’s efforts to host the Obama Presidential Center in Honolulu.

== Awards and honors ==
In 2011, his book Texas Tough was awarded the PEN/John Kenneth Galbraith Award for nonfiction.

November 11, 2011 was officially declared "Robert Perkinson day" in the state of Hawai'i by governor Neil Abercrombie and lieutenant governor Brian Schatz.

== Recent Publications ==
- "Rick Perry, Criminal Justice Reformer?" The New Republic. 17 September 2011
- "Nightmares of My Grandfather." Huffington Post. 26 May 2010
- "The 'Jim Crow' Injustice of Crack Cocaine Continues." The Root. 13 May 2010
- "‘Hell Exploded’: Prisoner Music and Memoir and the Fall of Convict Leasing in Texas." Prison Journal. 89, no. 1, March 2009
- "The Prison Dilemma: Getting Past the Punitive Turn." The Nation. 6 July 2009
- "American Race Relations in the Age of Obama." Journal of English and American Studies (South Korea). 7, December 2008
- "Guarded Hope: Lessons from the History of the Prison Boom." Boston Review. July/August 2008
- "Angola and the Agony of Prison Reform." Radical Philosophy Review. 3, no. 1 (2000)
- "'Between the Worst of the Past and the Worst of the Future': Reconsidering Convict Leasing in the South" (review) Radical History Review 71 (Spring 1998)
- "Adjusting the World Bank." Critical Asian Studies (formerly, Bulletin of Concerned Asian Scholars). 27, no. 3 (October–December 1995)
- "Introduction to the Korean Nuclear Crisis." Critical Asian Studies. 26, nos. 1–2 (January–June 1994)

=== External links ===
- Big Think interview
- C-SPAN interview
- Open Society Foundations interview
- University of Hawaiʻi at Mānoa, Department of American Studies bio
