= Texas Tough =

2010 nonfiction book by Robert Perkinson

Texas Tough: The Rise of America's Prison Empire
- Author: Robert Perkinson
- Language: English
- Genre: Non-fiction
- Publisher: Metropolitan Books
- Publication date: 2010
- Publication place: United States
- ISBN: 9780805080698
- OCLC: 317928797

Texas Tough: The Rise of America's Prison Empire is a 2010 book by Robert Perkinson, published by Metropolitan Books.

Perkinson, an American Studies professor at University of Hawaii at Manoa, describes the criminal justice system in Texas and how it formed in the context of the post-United States Civil War environment. Perkinson states that, unlike the prisons described in his book, the early prison systems studied by many criminologists are those in New England. Perkinson describes the historical system as being punishment-only and primarily motivated to suppress black people when it was no longer possible to legally enslave them without their having committed a crime. Therefore, Perkinson perceived this system as a continuation of slavery. The book covers the terms of O.B. Ellis and George Beto as the heads of the Texas prison system, as well as the Ruiz v. Estelle lawsuit. The author argues that in the post-Civil Rights Movement era in the 20th Century the rest of the country ultimately adopted the punitive Southern attitude towards incarceration.

The book criticizes the expansion of incarceration and the pro-incarceration political movements.

== Background ==
The book's title originates from an October 2000 report by the Justice Policy Institute. Perkinson spent over 10 years researching the book; he consulted 30 archival collections, conducted ethnographic research, and used government records. Perkinson also interviewed David Ruiz, the plaintiff of Ruiz v. Estelle; William Wayne Justice, a federal judge; other current prisoners; former prisoners; prison guards; congressional officials; other writers; reform activists; and attorneys.

== Reception ==
Sasha Abramsky of the Columbia Journalism Review argued that "Perkinson tells a generally compelling (if overlong and occasionally unfocused) story, which blends history, cultural commentary, folklore, and ethnography." Abramsky recommends reading Texas Tough and Orange Is the New Black: My Year in a Women's Prison (2010) at the same time, because of the juxtaposition of the two different types of prison environments and prisoners described.

Dr. Paul M. Lucko of Murray State University described the book as "a superb historical analysis". Lucko argued that Perkinson's focus on Texas as the source of anti-blacks does not take into account historically higher sentences for blacks in the Northeast before and after the American Civil War; he also stated that "Perkinson does not satisfactorily explain how the judicially discredited Texas control model inspired the nation's prison construction boom", and that it may be unfair to single out Texas if the book argued that "the prison itself is more irredeemable than most of its inmates."

R. D. McCrie of the John Jay College of Criminal Justice, City University of New York described it as a "brilliant and important publication" that "alas, isn't easy reading at times."

David Pitt of Booklist deemed the work "[a] fascinating and often deeply troubling book."

Mitchel P. Roth of the Southwestern Historical Quarterly described the book "wide-ranging, well-organized and well written" work "that should be among the standard works on Texas criminal justice history for years to come" and that "Anyone trying to gain an understanding of the Texan love affair with the prison system will find many of the answers in this provocative and thoroughly researched book."

== See also ==
- Orange Is the New Black: My Year in a Women's Prison (2010; Piper Kerman's memoir)
- Texas Department of Criminal Justice
- Behind the Walls: A Guide for Families and Friends of Texas Prison Inmates (2002, a book about the prison system written by a prisoner)
- In This Timeless Time, a book about the Texas death row for men
