= The Prison Journal =

- Language: English
- Edited by: Rosemary L. Gido

Publication details
- History: 1921-present
- Publisher: SAGE Publications (United States)
- Frequency: Quarterly
- Open access: No
- Impact factor: 0.698 (2017)

Standard abbreviations
- ISO 4: Prison J.

Indexing
- ISSN: 0032-8855 (print); 1552-7522 (web)
- LCCN: 28012243
- OCLC no.: 39928233

Links
- Journal homepage; Online access; Online archive

The Prison Journal is a peer-reviewed academic journal that publishes papers in the field of Criminology. The journal's editor is Rosemary L. Gido (Indiana University of Pennsylvania). It has been in publication since 1921 and is currently published quarterly by SAGE Publications.

== Scope ==
The Prison Journal explores broad themes of punishment and correctional intervention with the aim of advancing theory, research, policy and practice. The journal also provides evaluative accounts of programs and policies, surveys and reviews and analysis. The Prison Journal provides a forum for ideas and discussions on adult and juvenile confinement and treatment interventions.

== Abstracting and indexing ==
The Prison Journal is abstracted and indexed in, among other databases: SCOPUS, and the Social Sciences Citation Index. According to the Journal Citation Reports, its 2017 impact factor is 0.698, ranking it 48th out of 61 journals in the category ‘Criminology & Penology’.
