= Ruiz v. Estelle =

1974 Texas class action lawsuit over prison conditions

- Court: United States District Court for the Southern District of Texas
- Full case name: David Resendez Ruiz v. W.J. Estelle, Jr., Director, Texas Department of Corrections
- Decided: 1980 (original judgment)
- Citations: 503 F. Supp. 1265 (S.D. Tex. 1980), 550 F.2d 238

Case history
- Prior action: Handwritten petition filed by David Resendez Ruiz in 1972
- Subsequent actions: Numerous consent decrees, appeals, and legal actions, culminating in a final judgment in 1992; further litigation related to compliance continued.
- Related action: Jones v. Bock (2007)

Court membership
- Judge sitting: Judge William Justice

Case opinions
- 118-page decision by Judge William Justice (Ruiz v. Estelle, 503 F.Supp. 1295)
- Decision by: Judge William Justice

Keywords
- Prison conditions; Cruel and unusual punishment; Overcrowding; Healthcare; Abuse; Prison reform; Texas Department of Corrections; Prison Litigation Reform Act

Ruiz v. Estelle, 503 F. Supp. 1265 (S.D. Tex. 1980), filed in United States District Court for the Southern District of Texas, eventually became the most far-reaching lawsuit on the conditions of prison incarceration in American history.

It began as a civil action, a handwritten petition filed against the Texas Department of Corrections (TDC) in 1972 by inmate David Resendez Ruíz alleging that the conditions of his incarceration, such as overcrowding, lack of access to health care, and abusive security practices, were a violation of his constitutional rights. In 1974, the petition was joined by seven other inmates and became a class action suit known as Ruiz v. Estelle, 550 F.2d 238. The trial ended in 1979 with the ruling that the conditions of imprisonment within the TDC prison system constituted cruel and unusual punishment in violation of the United States Constitution, with the original judgment issued in 1980, a 118-page decision by Judge William Justice (Ruiz v. Estelle, 503 F.Supp. 1295).

The decision led to federal oversight of the system, with a prison construction boom and "sweeping reforms ... that fundamentally changed how Texas prisons operated."

== David Resendez Ruíz ==
David Resendez Ruíz was a Mexican-American from East Austin, Texas.

The son of migrant farmworkers and the youngest of 13 children, he got into trouble with the law from an early age; as a child he was arrested for fighting and shoplifting. After an arrest for a car theft, 12-year-old Ruíz received a sentence to serve time in Gatesville State School in Gatesville; he arrived for his first session in 1954. In Gatesville he socialized with "hard core" state school students from Austin and San Antonio. Ruíz had four sessions in Gatesville. After Ruíz left Gatesville for the final time, he turned 17, which made him an adult in the Texas penal system.

After another car theft, he was sentenced to serve time in the Texas Department of Corrections (TDC). He initially was placed in Huntsville; two weeks later he was assigned to the Ramsey Farm in Brazoria County, Texas, where he worked in fields. In Ramsey, Ruíz attempted to kill an inmate who he believed was planning to have Ruíz killed; the stabbing injured but did not kill the prisoner. The prison authorities beat Ruíz as a punishment. During his confinement in Ramsey, Ruíz had also committed lesser infractions. His first adult sentence lasted seven years. After he left prison, Ruíz married a woman named Rose Marie and the two had a daughter together.

Thirteen months after his release, in July 1968, Ruíz was again placed in the custody of the TDC; he said that he had "picked up the gun" because he had no education or trade skills to support himself and his family. He was then assigned to the Eastham Unit in Houston County, where he continued to work in fields. While at Eastham, Ruíz participated in a failed escape attempt. The warden of Eastham and George Beto, the TDC director, escorted Ruíz back to prison.

After a week in the infirmary, Ruíz was placed in solitary confinement for 45 days; there he decided to become a prison activist. There, David Ruiz joined a group of "writ writers" and activists known as "Eight Hoe" under the leadership of Fred Cruz and his attorney Frances Jalet. Ruiz joined a wide social movement of prisoners who drew upon civil rights and labor resistance, as well as the sharp critique of the criminal justice by Black Power and the Chicano Movement. After Ruíz left solitary confinement, he refused to work in the fields any longer and cut his Achilles tendon with a razor. Because of the self-inflicted injuries, Ruíz was no longer required to work, and he was sent to various correctional and medical facilities. Ruíz had committed many disciplinary infractions, including the stabbing, the escape attempt, and the refusal to work, so he was sent to the Wynne Unit, where he met Fred Cruz, a prisoner who filed successful lawsuits against the prison system. At the Wynne Unit, Ruíz, Cruz, and other prisoners worked together to file lawsuits against TDC.

Ruíz died while incarcerated in 2005 at a Texas prison hospital at the age of 63.

== Trial ==
Ruiz was the largest and longest civil rights trial in the history of US jurisprudence up to that point, convening in October 1978 and adjourning in late December 1980 with over 349 witnesses. 100 of the witnesses were prisoners themselves. The trial was "a struggle over state violence, coerced labor, and an internal labor division that privileged some prisoners, particularly white prisoners, while castigating others to the bottom ranks of hard field labor". In addition to a variety of physical abuses suffered by inmates, there was also a large amount of economic and sexual exploitation and abuse, referred to by many as neo-slavery. The trial received broad support from those within Texas State Prisons, including a large prison labor strike that expanded to cover six of prisons with approximately 15% of the prison population stopping work.

== Subsequent litigation ==
There followed a long period of further litigation in the form of consent decrees, appeals and other legal actions, until a final judgment was rendered in 1992. But problems in enforcement continued, and in 1996 U.S. Congress enacted the Prison Litigation Reform Act (PLRA) to address these issues as well as abuse of the prison litigation process.

However, in October 1997, the district court, still not satisfied with the compliance of the TDC, gave permission for continuing site visits by attorneys and experts for the inmate class, and this continued into 1999. In response to this, the TDC issued more than 450,000 pages of evidence and accepted 50 additional site visits. In 2001, the court found that the TDC was in compliance on the issue of use of force against inmates and had adequate policies and procedures in place. However, the court continued to have issues with the "current and ongoing constitutional violations regarding administrative segregation [in] the conditions of confinement and the practice of using administrative segregation to house mentally ill inmates" that it found.

In 2007, in the consolidated case of Jones v. Bock the U.S. Supreme Court, in a unanimous decision, set forth limitations on the extent of prison litigation.

== See also ==
- Trusty system
- Gates v. Collier
- Convict lease
- List of class-action lawsuits
