= Texas State Highway 105 =

Highway in Texas

State Highway 105
- SH 105; mainline in red, business route in blue

Route information
- Maintained by TxDOT
- Length: 150.4 mi (242.0 km)
- Existed: 1925–present

Major junctions
- West end: Bus. US 290 at Brenham
- SH 6 in Navasota; SH 249 near Navasota; I-45 in Conroe; I-69 / US 59 in Cleveland
- East end: US 69 / US 96 / US 287 at Beaumont

Location
- Country: United States
- State: Texas
- Counties: Washington, Brazos, Grimes, Montgomery, San Jacinto, Liberty, Hardin, Jefferson

Highway system
- Highways in Texas; Interstate; US; State; Former; Toll; Loops; Spurs; FM/RM; Park; Rec
← SH 104	→ SH 106

State Highway 105 (SH 105) is a state highway in the U.S. state of Texas that runs from Brenham to the outskirts of Beaumont. The route was originally proposed in 1925 and took its current routing in 1984.

== Route description ==
SH 105 begins as a pair of one-way roads at an intersection with Business U.S. Route 290 in downtown Brenham. It then progresses northeast out of Brenham through mainly farming lands. It passes near Washington-on-the-Brazos, Texas, which is the birthplace of Texas as the location of the signing of the Texas Declaration of Independence. It then crosses the Brazos River before passing through Navasota. The route briefly joins SH 6 before proceeding east again. It passes near Lake Conroe before entering the city of Conroe and an intersection with Interstate 45. The route continues east, passing through the very southern edge of Sam Houston National Forest before reaching Cleveland and an intersection with Interstate 69/U.S. Route 59. The route continues east out of Cleveland, briefly coinciding with SH 321, passing through a large section of East Texas Piney Woods, before reaching its eastern terminus at U.S. Routes 69, 96, and 287 on the far northern edge of Beaumont.

== Route history ==
The highway was originally proposed on June 8, 1925 from Brenham east through Navasota and Conroe to Cleveland, roughly paralleling a local railroad line. By 1926, the section from Brenham to Navasota was transferred to SH 90. On April 6, 1932, a proposed extension east to Moss Hill was designated. On July 12, 1933, a new section of SH 105 was under construction, being built westward from Beaumont to Moss Hill, replacing SH 133. On March 19, 1935, it was shifted north through Rye. On July 15, 1935, all of SH 105 east of Cleveland was cancelled (as it had not been built yet). On February 11, 1937, the section from Moss Hill to Beaumont was restored (but not Cleveland to Rye, so a gap was created). On February 25, 1937, SH 105 Loop was designated through Conroe. On June 21, 1938, the Cleveland-Neville's Ferry Road from Cleveland to Rye had its routing approved, and construction started on it. On March 18, 1947, SH 105 was routed on the Cleveland-Neville's Ferry Road, closing the gap. Construction was sporadic, with the section between Conroe and Beaumont not completed until the 1960s. On March 26, 1962, the section of SH 105 from Moss Hill and on a line equidistant between Batson and Saratoga to FM 770 was cancelled, creating a gap. On February 28, 1973, the section of SH 90 from Navasota to Brenham was transferred back to SH 105 and the section of SH 105 from SH 6 west to Loop 508 (now Business SH 6) was transferred to Spur 515. The current route was set on December 21, 1984 with the highway replacing FM 162 and shortening the route from Cleveland to Beaumont. The old route became part of FM 787. One portion of FM 162 was originally designated as FM 1935. On August 25, 2005, a new routing around Cleveland was approved for construction, while the section through Cleveland was designated as a business route of 105: 105-T. Construction has been completed.

== Business routes ==

SH 105 has one business route.

Business State Highway 105-T is a Business Loop that runs on the former routing of SH 105 through Cleveland in southeast Texas. The road was designated in 2005, in preparation of the bypass routing of the main highway south of Cleveland.

== Major intersections ==
County	Location	mi	km	Destinations	Notes
Washington	Brenham	0.0	0.0	Bus. US 290 (Market Street / East Main Street)	
Washington	Brenham	0.8	1.3	FM 577 (Blue Bell Road)	
Washington		2.7	4.3	FM 50 north – Independence, Airport	
Washington		8.2	13.2	FM 2193 east	
Washington		9.2	14.8	FM 390 west	
Washington		13.8	22.2	FM 912 east – Washington on the Brazos State Park	
Washington		18.3	29.5	FM 1155 south – Washington, Washington on the Brazos State Park	
Brazos		20.6	33.2	FM 159 north – Millican	
Grimes	Navasota	24.0	38.6	FM 379 south / Fifth Street / truck route – Wallace Pack Unit	
Grimes	Navasota	24.5	39.4	Bus. SH 6 (La Salle Street) – College Station, Hempstead	
Grimes	Navasota	25.6	41.2	SH 6 north / SH 90 north – Anderson, Waco, College Station	Interchange
Grimes	Navasota	27.1	43.6	SH 6 south / Spur 515 west (truck route) – Houston, Navasota	Interchange
Grimes				FM 362 south – Camp Allen, Whitehall	Unsigned turnaround to eastbound 105
Grimes				SH 249 south	Interchange; eastbound exit and westbound entrance
Grimes				FM 1748 south to SH 249 south	Provides westbound access to SH 249 southbound via FM 1748 south and CR 306 east
Grimes				FM 2445 north	
Grimes				Spur 234 south – Stoneham	
Grimes	Plantersville			FM 1774 – Anderson, Magnolia, Fanthrop Inn State Park	
Montgomery	Dobbin			FM 1486 – Dacus, Magnolia	
Montgomery	Montgomery			FM 149 (The Montgomery Trace) – Richards, Tomball	
Montgomery	Montgomery			FM 2854 east / Lone Star Parkway	
Montgomery	Conroe			FM 3083 south (Carter Moore Drive) to I-45	
Montgomery	Conroe			Loop 336 – Cleveland	
Montgomery	Conroe			I-45 – Huntsville, Houston	I-45 exit 87A
Montgomery	Conroe			SH 75 (North Frazier Street)	
Montgomery	Conroe			FM 1314 south – Porter	
Montgomery	Conroe			FM 3083 – Grangerland	
Montgomery	Conroe			Loop 336 to I-45 north – Navasota	
Montgomery	Cut and Shoot			FM 1485 south – New Caney	
Montgomery	Cut and Shoot			FM 1484 west – Groceville	
Liberty				Bus. SH 105 east – Cleveland	at-grade intersection; west end of freeway
Liberty				I-69 / US 59 – Houston, Lufkin	I-69/US 59 exit 171; interchange
Liberty				FM 1010 – Cleveland, Plum Grove	interchange
Liberty	Cleveland			Bus. SH 105 west / SH 321 north – Cleveland, Conroe	at-grade intersection; east end of freeway; west end of SH 321 overlap
Liberty				SH 321 south – Dayton	East end of SH 321 overlap
Liberty				FM 2518 to FM 787 – Romayor, Tarkington	
Liberty	Moss Hill			SH 146 – Rye, Hardin	
Hardin	Batson			FM 770 south – Hull	West end of FM 770 overlap
Hardin				FM 770 north – Saratoga	East end of FM 770 overlap
Hardin	Sour Lake			SH 326 – Kountze, Nome	
Jefferson	Beaumont			FM 364 (Major Drive) to US 90	
Jefferson	Beaumont			US 69 / US 96 / US 287 – Lumberton, Port Arthur	Interchange
Jefferson	Beaumont			Concord Road	Continuation beyond U.S. Routes 69, 96, and 287
1.000 mi = 1.609 km; 1.000 km = 0.621 mi: Concurrency terminus; Incomplete access
