= Hardin High School (Texas) =

Public school in Hardin, Texas, United States

Location
- 501 FM 834; Liberty, Texas 77575; United States; 30.15660°N 94.73436°W

Information
- School type: Public high school
- School district: Hardin Independent School District
- Principal: Dr. Robert Thibodeaux
- Grades: 9–12
- Enrollment: 396 (2023–2024)
- Colors: Blue, white, and gold
- Athletics conference: UIL Class 3A
- Nickname: Hornets
- Website: Hardin High School

Hardin High School is a public high school serving students grades 9–12 located in the city of Hardin, Liberty County, Texas, United States. As part of the Hardin Independent School District, it is attended by students in the city of Hardin, a portion of Big Thicket Lake Estates, and a section of Liberty. It alo includes unincorporated communities of Moss Hill, Rye, Romayor, Franklin and others within Liberty County. It is one of the two secondary schools and the only high school in the district. It participates in UIL region 3A. In 2022, the school received a "B" rating by the Texas Education Agency.

== History ==
As the Hardin area grew, several school districts in the Hardin area voted to consolidate in February 1939. In March 1939, Hardin High school was established by the merger of five schools. By September of the same year, architects and district officials received approval from the Texas Department of Education to build a Hardin High School. 16 acres of land were donated Col. R. W. and Geraldine Humphreys of Liberty. Classes began in 1940. The current building housing Hardin High School was built in 1997.

In 2007, the school received a bomb threat. Liberty County sheriff deputies blocked off the whole area.

As of the 2022, the graduation rate of 98.6% exceeded the state average of 90.

== Athletics ==
The Hardin Hornets compete in the following sports:

- Baseball
- Basketball
- Cross country
- Football
- Golf
- Powerlifting
- Softball
- Track and field
- Volleyball

=== State championships ===
- Girls' Basketball–
  - 1981 (2A)
  - 1982 (2A)
  - 1983 (2A)
- Tennis
  - 1992 (3A)
