= Tarkington High School =

Public school in Tarkington Prairie, Texas, United States

Location
- 2770 FM 163; Cleveland, Texas 77575; United States; 30.3150°N 94.9640°W

Information
- School type: Public
- School district: Tarkington Independent School District
- Principal: Latoya Pea (interim)
- Faculty: 33.40 (on FTE basis)
- Grades: 9-12
- Enrollment: 552 (2023-2024)
- Student to teacher ratio: 16.53
- Colors: Maroon and gold
- Athletics conference: UIL 4A
- Mascot: Longhorn
- Website: ths.tarkingtonisd.net

Tarkington High School is a public high school serving students grades 9–12 located in Tarkington Prairie, Liberty County, Texas, United States, 7.5 miles from Cleveland, Texas. It is the only high school part of the Tarkington Independent School District. It is attended by students residing in communities of Tarkington, Ainsworth, Rayburn, and Macedonia, and other portions of Liberty County. Students compete in UIL Region 3A. In 2022, the school received a "B" rating from the Texas Education Agency. In 2015, it was commended for meeting all indexes and having high improvement in performance.

== Athletics ==
The Tarkington Longhorns participate in the following sports:

- Baseball
- Basketball
- Cross country
- Football
- Golf
- Powerlifting
- Softball
- Tennis
- Track and field
- Volleyball

== Notable alumni ==
- Jason Grimsley, Major League Baseball pitcher
