= Texas State Highway 146 =

State highway in Texas

State Highway 146
- SH 146 highlighted in red

Route information
- Maintained by TxDOT
- Length: 105.966 mi (Note: The certified mileage given is shorter than the actual mileage as TxDOT considers SH 146 to be discontinuous at rather than concurrent with US 90.) (170.536 km)
- Existed: 1930–present

Major junctions
- South end: I-45 / SH 6 at Texas City
- I-10 at Mont Belvieu; US 90 from Dayton to Liberty; US 190 at Livingston
- North end: Future I-69 / US 59 at Livingston

Location
- Country: United States
- State: Texas

Highway system
- Highways in Texas; Interstate; US; State; Former; Toll; Loops; Spurs; FM/RM; Park; Rec
← SH 145	→ SH 147

State Highway 146 (SH 146) is a north–south highway in southeastern Texas beginning at I-45 near La Marque and Texas City. It then crosses over the Fred Hartman Bridge over the Houston Ship Channel which carries SH 146 traffic. It then continues north towards Dayton, where it meets US 90 and then heads north and terminates in Livingston at US 59 (Future I-69).

== History ==
SH 146 was designated on March 19, 1930, from SH 6/US 75 northward to Texas City as a renumbering of SH 6A. On July 2, 1932, SH 146 was extended north to Dayton. On August 3, 1932, SH 146 was extended north to Cleveland (the plan was to delete SH 132 when this extension was completed). On September 22, 1932, this extension was canceled, and SH 146 was instead extended north to Livingston, replacing SH 132. On December 16, 1967, SH 146 was relocated east of Liberty. On February 21, 1984, SH 146 was extended south from SH 3 to I-45. On March 28, 1996, SH 146 was relocated in Baytown replacing Loop 201. The old route of SH 146 was redesignated as Business State Highway 146-E.

Spur 201 was designated on December 17, 1941, from SH 146 in Black Duck Bay to Main Street. On September 23, 1959, Spur 201 was redesignated as Loop 201 and was extended to SH 146 at McKinney Road. On October 22, 1976, Loop 201 was extended to SH 146 at Ferry Road. On March 28, 1996, Loop 201 was redesignated as part of SH 146.

== Route description ==
SH 146 begins at its southern terminus at Interstate 45 in Bayou Vista, running concurrent with Loop 197 for about 0.5 miles (0.80 km). It then heads northwest and interchanging with SH 3. It then passes by Moses Lake and runs by Trinity Bay. Between Bayview and Kemah, it intersects SH 96. The route then interchanges SH 225 before crossing at the Fred Hartman Bridge over the Houston Ship Channel; from 1953 to 1995, SH 146 crossed under the Houston Ship Channel via the Baytown Tunnel. In Baytown, the highway forms one of its business routes and then interchanges SH 330 before looping east. It then interchanges I-10 before entering Mont Belvieu. After heading north and entering Dayton, SH 146 meets US 90 and runs concurrent with it until reaching Liberty, intersecting SH 321 and Loop 227. It also crosses over the Trinity River before entering Liberty. After separating from US 90, the route heads north, then northeast after intersecting Loop 227, passing by the Trinity River National Wildlife Refuge and then passing through Hardin. It intersects SH 105 in Moss Hill as it proceeds north. The route then passes through Rye and by Ace before reaching Livingston. It intersects US 190 before reaching its northern terminus at US 59 (future Interstate 69 corridor).

== Business routes ==
SH 146 has two business routes.

=== La Porte Business Spur ===
Business State Highway 146-D (formerly Loop 410) is a business loop that runs from SH 146 in La Porte to Spur 501. The highway was designated on December 1, 1971 as Loop 410 from SH 146 east, north, and west to SH 146, and was marked as a business route of SH 146. On July 28, 1977, the section from SH 146 via Fairmont Parkway to Spur 501 was cancelled, and Loop 410 was rerouted replacing part of Spur 501 and all of Spur 498. Loop 410 was redesignated as Business State Highway 146-D on June 21, 1990. On March 26, 2009, the section from Spur 501 via Broadway Street north to Main Street and west via Main Street to SH 146 was given to the city of La Porte.

=== Baytown Business Loop ===
Business State Highway 146-E is a business loop that runs from SH 146 through Baytown to SH 146. On March 28, 1996, SH 146 was relocated in Baytown replacing Loop 201, and the old route of SH 146 was redesignated as Business State Highway 146-E.

== Junction list ==
County	Location	mi	km	Destinations	Notes
Galveston	Bayou Vista	0.0	0.0	I-45 / SH 6 – Houston, Galveston, Hitchcock	I-45 exit 7 southbound, 7A northbound; south end of SH 3 overlap; no access to IH 45 southbound from SH 146 southbound, access is via IH 45 northbound to FM 519 U-turn
Galveston	Texas City	0.1	0.16	Spur 197 north (Texas City Port Boulevard)	Former southern terminus of Loop 197
Galveston	Texas City	0.7	1.1	SH 3 north – La Marque	Interchange; north end of SH 3 overlap
Galveston	Texas City	1.9	3.1	FM 519 – Hitchcock, Texas City	
Galveston	Texas City	3.4	5.5	FM 1765 – La Marque, Texas City	
Galveston	Texas City	4.3	6.9	FM 1764 – Texas City	South end of freeway; access to HCA Houston Healthcare Mainland
Galveston	Texas City	5.2	8.4	25th Avenue	North end of freeway; former northern terminus of Loop 197
Galveston	Texas City	10.1	16.3	FM 517 – Dickinson, San Leon	
Galveston	Texas City	12.2	19.6	FM 646 – Dickinson, Bacliff	Future south end of SH 99 overlap
Galveston	Kemah	14.4	23.2	SH 96 west – League City	
Galveston	Kemah	14.7	23.7	FM 518 west / FM 2094 west	Interchange; south end of freeway
Galveston–Harris county line	Kemah–Seabrook line			Bridge over Clear Lake	
Harris	Seabrook	16.6	26.7	NASA 1 – Seabrook, Johnson Space Center	Access to Houston Methodist Clear Lake Hospital
Harris	Seabrook			Repsdorph Road	Southbound exit and northbound entrance
Harris	Seabrook	18.1	29.1	Red Bluff Road	No northbound entrance
Harris		19.6	31.5	Port Road – Port of Houston Bayport Terminal	Southbound exit and northbound entrance, northbound exit is via McCabe Road
Harris		20.7	33.3	Shoreacres Boulevard, Choate Road	No northbound exit, northbound access is via McCabe Road
Harris	La Porte	21.7	34.9	McCabe Road	No northbound entrance
Harris	La Porte	21.8	35.1	Bus. SH 146 (Wharton Weems Boulevard)	Former southern terminus of unsigned Loop 410; no northbound entrance
Harris	La Porte	23.0	37.0	Fairmont Parkway	No northbound entrance
Harris	La Porte	23.9	38.5	Bus. SH 146 (West Main Street) / Spencer Highway	Former northern terminus of unsigned Loop 410
Harris	La Porte	24.8	39.9	Barbours Cut Boulevard	Southbound exit and northbound entrance
Harris	La Porte	25.5	41.0	SH 225 west – Pasadena, Houston	
Harris	La Porte–Baytown line			Fred Hartman Bridge over Houston Ship Channel	
Harris	Baytown	28.2	45.4	SH 99 Toll north (Grand Parkway) to Bus. SH 146 / Wyoming Street	Northbound exit and southbound entrance; future north end of SH 99 overlap; former southern terminus point of Loop 201
Harris	Baytown	28.4	45.7	Missouri Street	
Harris	Baytown	29.3	47.2	West Main Street	Signed at Missouri Street northbound; no northbound entrance
Harris	Baytown	30.0	48.3	West Texas Avenue, Decker Drive, J. B. LeFevre Drive	
Harris	Baytown	30.8	49.6	Spur 330 west to I-10	
Harris	Baytown	31.1	50.1	Garth Road, Decker Drive	
Harris	Baytown	31.8	51.2	North Main Street	
Harris	Baytown	33.5	53.9	Bus. SH 146 (Alexander Drive)	Interchange; north end of freeway; former northern terminus point of Loop 201
Chambers	Baytown	36.0	57.9	FM 565 east	
Chambers	Baytown	36.4	58.6	FM 1405 south / Twisted Oak Street	
Chambers	Mont Belvieu	39.5	63.6	I-10	I-10 exit 797
Chambers	Mont Belvieu	40.6	65.3	Loop 207 north	
Chambers	Mont Belvieu	41.4	66.6	FM 565 east	
Chambers	Mont Belvieu	42.0	67.6	Loop 207 south	
Chambers	Mont Belvieu	42.1	67.8	FM 1942 west to FM 2100	
Chambers	Mont Belvieu	42.9	69.0	SH 99 Toll (Grand Parkway)	
Chambers	Mont Belvieu	43.4	69.8	FM 3360 south	
Liberty		48.7	78.4	FM 1413 west to US 90	
Liberty	Dayton	55.0	88.5	US 90 west – Houston	South end of US 90 overlap
Liberty	Dayton	55.3	89.0	SH 321 north (South Cleveland Street) to FM 1960 – Cleveland	
Liberty	Dayton	55.6	89.5	FM 1409 south	
Liberty	Liberty	61.1	98.3	Loop 227 north / FM 2684 south	
Liberty	Liberty	61.9	99.6	FM 563 south – Anahuac	
Liberty	Liberty	62.6	100.7	US 90 east – Beaumont	North end of US 90 overlap
Liberty	Liberty	64.1	103.2	Loop 227 south – Business District	
Liberty	Liberty	65.3	105.1	FM 1011 north	
Liberty		67.4	108.5	FM 2830 south – Ames	
Liberty	Hardin	70.3	113.1	FM 834 – Daisetta	
Liberty	Moss Hill	76.6	123.3	SH 105 – Cleveland, Batson	Former FM 162
Liberty	Rye	90.1	145.0	FM 787 – Romayor, Saratoga	Former alignment of SH 105
Polk		98.5	158.5	FM 2610 south – Ace	
Polk		100.7	162.1	FM 943 east – Segno, Dallardsville	
Polk		102.1	164.3	FM 2665 west – Goodrich	
Polk		107.3	172.7	FM 1988 south – Goodrich	
Polk	Livingston	111.7	179.8	US 190 (East Church Street)	Access to CHI St. Luke's Health Livingston Memorial Hospital
Polk	Livingston	113.3	182.3	Future I-69 / US 59 / Bus. US 59-J south	Northern terminus; US 59 is the future Interstate 69
1.000 mi = 1.609 km; 1.000 km = 0.621 mi: Concurrency terminus; Incomplete access; Tolled
