= Farm to Market Road 1960 =

Road in Harris and Liberty counties in Texas, United States

Farm to Market Road 1960

- FM 1960 highlighted in red

Route information
- Maintained by TxDOT
- Length: 46.946 mi (75.552 km)
- Existed: 1951–present

Major junctions
- West end: SH 6
- US 290; SH 249; I-45; Hardy Toll Road; I-69 / US 59 in Humble; SH 99 Toll
- East end: SH 321 in Dayton

Location
- Country: United States
- State: Texas
- Counties: Harris, Liberty

Highway system
- Highways in Texas; Interstate; US; State; Former; Toll; Loops; Spurs; FM/RM; Park; Rec
← FM 1959	→ FM 1961

Farm to Market Road 1960 (FM 1960) is a farm-to-market road in the U.S. state of Texas, maintained by the Texas Department of Transportation. Its western terminus is at an intersection with U.S. Highway 290 (US 290) and State Highway 6 (SH 6) in northwestern Harris County. It travels generally to the east, ending at SH 321 in Dayton in western Liberty County. FM 1960 has long been an artery in Greater Houston, though it has been shortened and re-routed over the years. Once consisting of most of the current SH 6 in West Houston as well as its current northern route, it still traverses 26 ZIP codes north of the Houston city limits.

FM 1960 is also one of the very few FM roads with a business segment, which runs through the middle of Humble.

== History ==
Before becoming a Farm to Market road, part of the route was called Jackrabbit Road.

On June 27, 1995, the section west of FM 2100 had its internal designation changed to Urban Road 1960 (UR 1960). The designation of this segment reverted to FM 1960 with the elimination of the Urban Road system on November 15, 2018.

In 2011, the segment from SH 249 to Aldine-Westfield Road was designated as Cypress Creek Parkway in an effort to improve the image of the roadway. Landscaped medians with designated turn lanes replaced the broad open center median originally in place.

=== Historic western termini ===
- U.S. Highway 290 near Satsuma (May 23, 1951 – September 29, 1954)
- U.S. Highway 90 (September 29, 1954 – September 26, 1960)
- Farm to Market Road 1093 (September 26, 1960 – September 25, 1962)
- U.S. Highway 59 near Sugar Land (September 25, 1962 – November 1, 1968)
- U.S. Highway 290 near Satsuma (1968 – present)

=== Historic eastern termini ===
- Kuykendahl Road at Bammel (May 23, 1951 – December 17, 1952)
- 6.6 miles east of US 59 (December 17, 1952 – November 21, 1956)
- SH-321 (November 21, 1956 – present) (this extension replaced the section of FM 1008) from Huffman to SH-321

== Major intersections ==
County	Location	mi	km	Destinations	Notes
Harris		0.0	0.0	SH 6 south – Sugar Land	Continuation beyond US 290; access from SH 6 is via US 290 only
Harris		0.0	0.0	US 290 (Northwest Freeway) / SH 6 north – Austin, College Station, Hempstead, Houston	Three-level diamond interchange
Harris		0.8	1.3	North Eldridge Parkway	
Harris		1.4	2.3	Fallbrook Drive	
Harris		2.2	3.5	Jones Road	
Harris		2.3	3.7	Windfern Road	
Harris		3.8	6.1	Perry Road	
Harris		4.6	7.4	Mills Road	
Harris	Houston	5.1	8.2	SH 249 (Tomball Parkway) – Tomball, Houston	Three-level diamond interchange; former FM 149
Harris		6.2	10.0	Cutten Road	
Harris		7.6	12.2	Champion Forest Drive	
Harris		8.7	14.0	Stuebner Airline Road / Veterans Memorial Drive	
Harris		9.6	15.4	Walters Road	
Harris		9.9	15.9	T C Jester Boulevard	
Harris		11.1	17.9	Kuykendahl Road	Interchange
Harris		12.0	19.3	Ella Boulevard	
Harris		13.4	21.6	I-45 (North Freeway) – Dallas, Conroe, Houston	Three-level diamond interchange; I-45 exit 66 southbound, 66A northbound.
Harris		14.0	22.5	Imperial Valley Drive	
Harris		14.9	24.0	Hardy Toll Road	Three-level diamond interchange
Harris		16.1	25.9	Treaschwig Road / Bammel Road	
Harris		16.5	26.6	Aldine Westfield Road	
Harris		17.6	28.3	Rayford Road / Birnamwood Boulevard	
Harris		17.9	28.8	Richey Road	
Harris		19.6	31.5	Cypresswood Drive	
Harris	Houston	20.8	33.5	FM Bus. 1960 east	Former Loop 184
Harris		20.9	33.6	Lee Road	Access to George Bush Intercontinental Airport
Harris		21.6	34.8	Kenswick Drive	
Harris		22.5	36.2	Townsen Boulevard	
Harris	Humble	23.3	37.5	I-69 / US 59 (Eastex Freeway) – Cleveland, Houston	I-69 / US 59 exit 149
Harris		23.9	38.5	North Houston Avenue	
Harris		24.5	39.4	Wilson Road	
Harris		24.9	40.1	FM Bus. 1960 west / First Street East	Former Loop 184
Harris		26.8	43.1	Woodland Hills Drive	
Harris		28.8	46.3	Kings Park Way / Atasca Oaks Drive	
Harris		29.6	47.6	Atascocita Road	
Harris		29.8	48.0	West Lake Houston Parkway	
Harris	Huffman	34.5	55.5	FM 2100 / Crosby Huffman Road	
Harris		37.1	59.7	Huffman-Eastgate Road	
Liberty		40.9	65.8	FM 686	
Liberty		41.8	67.3	SH 99 Toll (Grand Parkway)	
Liberty	Dayton	46.9	75.5	SH 321 to US 90 / SH 146	Access to US 90 and SH 146 via SH 321 south
Liberty	Dayton	46.9	75.5	FM 1008 north	Continuation beyond SH 321
1.000 mi = 1.609 km; 1.000 km = 0.621 mi: Tolled

== Humble business loop ==
Business Farm to Market Road 1960-A
- Location: Humble
- Length: 4.124 mi (6.637 km)
- Existed: 1990–present

Map of Business Farm to Market Road 1960-A highlighted in red

Business Farm to Market Road 1960-A (Bus. FM 1960-A) is an east–west business route of FM 1960. It is 4.1 miles (6.6 km) long and is one of only three Business Farm to Market Roads in Texas. The road begins in Houston northeast of George Bush Intercontinental Airport and continues through central Humble as Humble Westfield Road to an intersection with the I-69/US 59 freeway. It then continues as First Street before reconnecting with FM 1960 east of Humble.

=== History ===
The route follows a previous alignment of FM 1960 through Humble, which was shifted to its present route through the city on June 21, 1978. At this time, the former alignment was designated State Highway Loop 184. It retained the state loop designation until the current business route was designated on June 21, 1990.

=== Major intersections ===
The entire route is in Harris County.

Location	mi	km	Destinations	Notes
Houston	0	0.0	FM 1960 – Westfield	Western terminus
Humble	2.5	4.0	I-69 / US 59 (Eastex Freeway) – Houston, Cleveland	I-69/US 59 exit 149.
	4.1	6.6	FM 1960 – Huffman	Eastern terminus
1.000 mi = 1.609 km; 1.000 km = 0.621 mi
