= Stilson =

Stilson may refer to:

== Places ==
- Stilson Canyon, California, United States
- Stilson, Iowa, unincorporated community, United States
- Stilson, Texas, unincorporated community, United States

== Given name ==
- Stilson Hutchins (1838–1912) an American newspaper reporter and publisher, best known as founder of The Washington Post.

== Other ==
- Stilson wrench, a heavy-duty adjustable wrench
- Stilson, a fictional character, see List of Ender's Game characters

== See also ==
- Stilton cheese is an English cheese, produced in two varieties: Blue and White
