= Lucile Plane State Jail =

Texas Department of Criminal Justice women's jail

Coordinates: 30°06′33″N 94°55′57″W

Lucile Plane State Jail is a Texas Department of Criminal Justice state jail for women located in unincorporated Liberty County, Texas. It is located on Texas State Highway 321, 5 miles (8.0 km) north of Dayton. The facility, on an approximately 394-acre (159 ha) plot of land, is co-located with the Hightower Prison Unit and the Henley State Jail. Plane is designed to hold 2,144 prisoners. Plane, the first women's state jail to be opened in Texas, was dedicated in June 1995.

== Conditions ==
Plane State Jail is one of the many Texas State jails under scrutiny for inhumane care and deficient medical support for prison population. Federal Judge has ordered TDCJ to install air conditioning. TDCJ has been slow to comply.

== Notable prisoners ==
- Laura Hall, perpetrator of the murder of Jennifer Cave
- Lisa Warzeka, one perpetrator of the 1999 Kingwood robbery incidents
- Alexandria Vera, Texas teacher, 24, who had sex repeatedly with her 13-year-old student and got pregnant with his child currently serving 10 years.
- Stephanie Raleen Forbes, Texas Teacher convicted of having an improper relationship with a student and sexual assault of a child.
- Jessica Vega, known as the bride who faked cancer in New York, or the cancer bride, in 2009. Convicted in 2023 of attempted kidnapping of a child.
- Zephaniah Renee “Zephi” Trevino, one of three people charged in connection with a 2019 robbery that led to the fatal shooting of Carlos Murillo
- Kaitlin Armstrong, 36, yoga teacher convicted of murdering rising cycling star Anna Moriah “Mo” Wilson, 25, over a friendship with her then boyfriend and professional cyclist Colin Strickland. The case caught national attention after Armstrong fled to Costa Rica beneath a stolen identify and underwent plastic surgery to conceal her appearance. She is currently serving 90 years.
