= Dempsie =

Dempsie may refer to:

== Surname ==
- Allan Dempsie (born 1982), Scottish footballer
- Brian Dempsie (born 1983), Scottish footballer
- Joe Dempsie (born 1987), British actor
- Mark Dempsie (born 1980), Scottish football player

== Places ==
- Dempsie Henley State Jail, women's jail in Texas, named after judge Dempsie Henley
