= Hightower, Texas =

Unincorporated community in Texas, United States

Coordinates: 30°23′30″N 94°58′20″W

Hightower is an unincorporated community in Liberty County, Texas, United States. It is a geographic area without official borders, centered on the intersection of FM 787 and FM 2518. It contains small farms, pastures, ranchettes, timber plantations, individual residential lots, small Protestant churches, and a Georgia Pacific lumber mill.

== Etymology ==
In 1899, the area became an official place named Lamb when it received a mail stop on the Gulf, Colorado and Santa Fe Railway (now BNSF Railway). The name Lamb was taken from the last name of its first postmaster, Charles C. Lamb. The area was rechristened Hightower in 1912 in honor of district judge Lewis B. Hightower Sr., who lived there while serving on the Ninth Judicial District bench from 1888 until his death in 1918.

== Government ==
Law enforcement is provided by the Liberty County Sheriff's office. Mail stops in the area are addressed "Cleveland, Texas", even though Hightower is six miles away from the City of Cleveland's incorporated area. The zip code is 77327.

== Infrastructure ==
Roads are maintained by the county. A BNSF Railway track runs through Hightower, connecting the cities of Cleveland and Silsbee. Drinking water comes from privately drilled wells, as there is not yet any municipal water utility service. Likewise private septic tanks. Electrical service is provided by Sam Houston Electric Cooperative [SHECO]. There is no natural gas utility service, so those with gas appliances must purchase and install private propane tanks.

== Education ==
Hightower is zoned to schools in the Tarkington Independent School District, which assesses taxes on real properties in the area.
