= Eastgate, Texas =

Human settlement in Texas, United States

Coordinates: 30°03′20″N 95°00′43″W

Eastgate is an unincorporated community in western Liberty County, Texas, United States. It is thirty-three miles northeast of Houston.

== Education ==
Eastgate is zoned to schools in the Dayton Independent School District.

== History ==
The town was planned out in 1911, but was not filed until two years later.
