= Dempsie Henley State Jail =

Jail in Liberty County, Texas, US

Coordinates: 30.105°N 94.930°W

Dempsie Henley State Jail is a Texas Department of Criminal Justice state jail for women located in unincorporated Liberty County, Texas. It is located on Texas State Highway 321, 5 miles (8.0 km) north of Dayton. The facility, on an approximately 394-acre (159 ha) plot of land, is co-located with the Hightower Prison Unit and the Plane State Jail. Henley is designed to hold around 500 prisoners.

Henley was dedicated on Friday, June 30, 1995. The facility was named after Dempsie Henley, who served as a Liberty County judge. Henley served for 16 years before he retired around January 1995. Henley had a stroke around that time, and he died on May 16, 1995.
