= Big Thicket Lake Estates, Texas =

- Census-designated place
- Location within Texas Location within the United States
- Coordinates: 30°29′35″N 94°46′14″W
- Country: United States
- State: Texas
- Counties: Polk, Liberty

Area
  - Total: 2.53 sq mi (6.54 km^{2})
  - Land: 2.34 sq mi (6.05 km^{2})
  - Water: 0.19 sq mi (0.48 km^{2})
- Elevation: 135 ft (41 m)

Population (2020)
  - Total: 514
  - Density: 318/sq mi (122.6/km^{2})
- Time zone: UTC-6 (Central (CST))
  - Summer (DST): UTC-5 (CDT)
- ZIP Codes: 77351, 77369
- FIPS code: 48-08240
- GNIS feature ID: 2586910

Big Thicket Lake Estates is a census-designated place (CDP) in Polk and Liberty counties, Texas, United States. This was a new CDP for the 2010 census, with a population of 742, decreasing to 514 at the 2020 census.

== Geography ==
Big Thicket Lake Estates is located along the southern border of Polk County and the northern border of Liberty County. The CDP has a total area of 2.5 square miles (6.5 km^{2}), of which 2.4 square miles (6.1 km^{2}) are land and 0.2 square miles (0.5 km^{2}), or 7.39%, are water. It is a residential community built around several artificial lakes, the largest of which is Bear Foot Lake, a reservoir built on Mill Creek, a tributary of Menard Creek and then the Trinity River.

Texas State Highway 146 forms the western edge of the community. The highway leads north 18 miles (29 km) to Livingston and south 31 miles (50 km) to Liberty.

== Demographics ==
Historical population
Census	Pop.	Note	%±
2010	742		—
2020	514		−30.7%
U.S. Decennial Census; 1850–1900 1910; 1920 1930 1940; 1950 1960 1970; 1980 1990 2000; 2010 2020

Big Thicket Lake Estates first appeared as a census designated place in the 2010 U.S. census.

Big Thicket Lake Estates CDP, Texas – Racial and ethnic composition Note: the US Census treats Hispanic/Latino as an ethnic category. This table excludes Latinos from the racial categories and assigns them to a separate category. Hispanics/Latinos may be of any race.
Race / Ethnicity (NH = Non-Hispanic)	Pop 2010	Pop 2020	% 2010	% 2020
White alone (NH)	660	442	88.95%	85.99%
Black or African American alone (NH)	1	2	0.13%	0.39%
Native American or Alaska Native alone (NH)	3	4	0.40%	0.78%
Asian alone (NH)	4	0	0.54%	0.00%
Native Hawaiian or Pacific Islander alone (NH)	0	0	0.00%	0.00%
Other race alone (NH)	0	2	0.00%	0.39%
Mixed race or Multiracial (NH)	19	26	2.56%	5.06%
Hispanic or Latino (any race)	55	38	7.41%	7.39%
Total	742	514	100.00%	100.00%

As of the 2020 United States census, there were 514 people, 242 households, and 131 families residing in the CDP.

== Education ==
Sections in Polk County are divided between the Big Sandy Independent School District and the Livingston Independent School District. Parts in Liberty County are in the Hardin Independent School District.

Areas in Polk County are in the service area, defined by the Texas Education Code, of Angelina College. Areas in Hardin ISD are in the service area of Lee College.
