= Dayton Lakes, Texas =

- City
- Coordinates: 30°08′41″N 94°49′15″W
- Country: United States
- State: Texas
- County: Liberty

Area
  - Total: 0.97 sq mi (2.51 km^{2})
  - Land: 0.86 sq mi (2.22 km^{2})
  - Water: 0.11 sq mi (0.29 km^{2})
- Elevation: 30 ft (9.1 m)

Population (2020)
  - Total: 45
  - Density: 52/sq mi (20/km^{2})
- Time zone: UTC-6 (Central (CST))
  - Summer (DST): UTC-5 (CDT)
- FIPS code: 48-19435
- GNIS feature ID: 2410302

Dayton Lakes is a city in Liberty County, Texas, United States. As of the 2020 census, Dayton Lakes had a population of 45. Prior to 1985 Dayton Lakes city was a developed and marketed recreational subdivision named Dayton Lake Estates. In January 1985 the corporation that marketed the original subdivision held and election of residents and when the election was successful, they petitioned the District Court in Liberty County, Texas and The City of Dayton Lakes, TX, a Non Profit Corporation, was created as a city/town. The actual document was filed and recorded on January 19, 1985. Those corporate papers are the city's legal identity.

== Geography ==
Dayton Lakes is located in central Liberty County 11 miles (18 km) northeast of Dayton, and 17 miles (27 km) by road north of Liberty, the county seat, but only 6 miles (10 km) as the crow flies.

According to the United States Census Bureau, the city of Dayton Lakes has a total area of 0.97 square miles (2.5 km^{2}), of which 0.85 square miles (2.2 km^{2}) are land and 0.1 square miles (0.3 km^{2}), or 11.64%, are water.

== Demographics ==
Historical population
Census	Pop.	Note	%±
1990	191		—
2000	101		−47.1%
2010	93		−7.9%
2020	45		−51.6%
U.S. Decennial Census; 1850–1900 1910; 1920 1930 1940; 1950 1960 1970; 1980 1990 2000; 2010 2020

=== 2020 census ===
As of the 2020 census, Dayton Lakes had a population of 45. The median age was 52.5 years. 13.3% of residents were under the age of 18 and 20.0% of residents were 65 years of age or older. For every 100 females there were 114.3 males, and for every 100 females age 18 and over there were 105.3 males age 18 and over.

0.0% of residents lived in urban areas, while 100.0% lived in rural areas.

There were 26 households in Dayton Lakes, of which 42.3% had children under the age of 18 living in them. Of all households, 38.5% were married-couple households, 23.1% were households with a male householder and no spouse or partner present, and 23.1% were households with a female householder and no spouse or partner present. About 30.8% of all households were made up of individuals and 11.5% had someone living alone who was 65 years of age or older.

There were 49 housing units, of which 46.9% were vacant. The homeowner vacancy rate was 4.2% and the rental vacancy rate was 25.0%.

Racial composition as of the 2020 census
Race	Number	Percent
White	40	88.9%
Black or African American	0	0.0%
American Indian and Alaska Native	0	0.0%
Asian	0	0.0%
Native Hawaiian and Other Pacific Islander	0	0.0%
Some other race	1	2.2%
Two or more races	4	8.9%
Hispanic or Latino (of any race)	4	8.9%

=== 2000 census ===
As of the census of 2000, there were 101 people, 43 households, and 26 families residing in the city. The population density was 120.4 inhabitants per square mile (46.5/km^{2}). There were 78 housing units at an average density of 93.0 per square mile (35.9/km^{2}). The racial makeup of the city was 99.01% White and 0.99% African American.

There were 43 households, out of which 30.2% had children under the age of 18 living with them, 44.2% were married couples living together, 2.3% had a female householder with no husband present, and 39.5% were non-families. 34.9% of all households were made up of individuals, and 4.7% had someone living alone who was 65 years of age or older. The average household size was 2.35 and the average family size was 2.96.

In the city, the population was spread out, with 27.7% under the age of 18, 3.0% from 18 to 24, 34.7% from 25 to 44, 24.8% from 45 to 64, and 9.9% who were 65 years of age or older. The median age was 36 years. For every 100 females, there were 119.6 males. For every 100 females age 18 and over, there were 151.7 males.

The median income for a household in the city was $37,083, and the median income for a family was $30,938. Males had a median income of $40,750 versus $23,750 for females. The per capita income for the city was $12,873. There were 20.7% of families and 27.2% of the population living below the poverty line, including 30.8% of under eighteens and none of those over 64.

== Education ==
The city of Dayton Lakes is served by the Dayton Independent School District.

Residents of Dayton ISD are zoned to Lee College.
