= Cleveland Municipal Airport =

Cleveland Municipal Airport may refer to:

- Cleveland Hopkins International Airport in Cleveland, Ohio, United States (FAA: CLE), known as Cleveland Municipal Airport until 1951
- Cleveland Municipal Airport (Mississippi) in Cleveland, Mississippi, United States (FAA: RNV)
- Cleveland Municipal Airport (Texas) in Cleveland, Texas, United States (FAA: 6R3)
- Hardwick Field, also known as Cleveland Municipal Airport, in Cleveland, Tennessee, United States (FAA: HDI)
