= 1999 Kingwood robbery incidents =

Kingwood Tx incident

From May to July 1999, four teenage girls from the Kingwood region of Houston, Texas, robbed four grocery stores and a bakery. These stores were in Harris and Montgomery counties. The girls called themselves the "Queens of Armed Robbery", and bought recreational drugs and body piercings with their money.

Jacqueline Helfgott, author of Criminal Behavior: Theories, Typologies and Criminal Justice, wrote that the fact the perpetrators were girls from upper-middle-class backgrounds meant the crime made news in Greater Houston and throughout the United States. Helfgott stated that despite the girls' use of recreational drugs, their accounts and the accounts of other people cited boredom as the primary reason for the crime.

The film Sugar & Spice is loosely based on the incident.

== Perpetrators ==
The perpetrators, all students or alumna of Kingwood High School, were:

- Krystal Dawn Maddox, 16
- Malissa Chalerm "Lisa" Warzeka, 17
  - Warzeka, born to an American father and a Thai mother, participated in the school athletic teams.
- Katie Marie Dunn, 17
- Michelle Renee Morneau, 18
  - Morneau, the oldest member of the crime group, had already graduated from Kingwood High prior to the crimes.

== Crimes ==
The girls planned the crimes while eating at a Kingwood Wendy's. The group targeted five places: Stop N Drive, Ryan's Bakery, Jack's Food Store/Jack's Grocery, Porter Food Store, and a store in Montgomery County. All of these places were on the periphery of Kingwood: either north along Porter Road or south on Hamblen Road.

Stop N Drive, the first location, was robbed on May 30 of that year. It was located in Montgomery County, on Texas State Highway Loop 494, outside of the western portion of Kingwood. Forest Cove Stop-n-Drive was robbed on July 1, and there the girls got $800 ($1546.14 adjusted for inflation), the largest amount in the robberies. Others resulted in cash and cigarettes. Ryan's Bakery was held up on July 5, and the adjacent Jack's Food Store was held up the subsequent weekend.

The girls used a 1999 Pontiac Firebird owned by Maddox's father as the getaway car. In each robbery two girls actively robbed while the others served as lookouts. Maddox was the only girl who participated in all of the robberies. They had watched television to get the modus operandi of the crime, and they had disguised themselves as males by using sunglasses, masks, hoods, and gloves. Their weapons were a .22 caliber rifle, a semiautomatic pistol, and a shotgun.

Shaila Dewan of the Houston Press wrote that, according to Billy Stephens of the Houston Police Department (HPD), the fact that "the robberies were so well planned and executed" was what "struck" him the most, and not merely that the perpetrators were upper middle class females.

Dunn and Morneau discussed the robberies with other people, attracting the attention of authorities.

== Arrest and prosecution ==
The HPD had the perpetrators in custody by August 6 of that year. Prior to the arrest the police sent undercover officers to eavesdrop on the girls when they were in public. The police stated that of the perpetrators, Dunn was the most cooperative. An assistant principal of Kingwood High identified perpetrators after listening to audiotapes of the robberies that occurred in Montgomery County.

Convictions for armed robbery could have resulted in any sentence from probation to 99 years of prison. Maddox, who police said was the ringleader, was tried as an adult and was the only girl who opted to have her case to go on trial. Maddox's case went on trial in Dallas, Texas, with a change of venue, in March 2000. The three other girls testified against her. She was convicted on April 10 of that year, and on April 14 she received a prison sentence of 7 1/2 years. Maddox received a longer sentence since she was the ringleader.

Dunn and Warzeka pleaded guilty to armed robbery and chose to have juries determine their sentences. The girls each received two concurrent prison sentences of 7 years, with parole eligibility in 3 years.

Morneau, who agreed to testify against her accomplices, received deferred adjudication from Mark Kent Ellis, a Texas state district judge. He required her to attend boot camp and serve parole. She attended her boot camp at the Harris County Boot Camp in Atascocita, and she had to serve 10 years of probation and perform 2,000 hours of community service. Morneau had stayed in the car during the robberies and consequently received a lighter sentence.

=== Incarceration and parole hearings ===
Maddox chose to stay in the Dallas County Jail as her appeal was launched; if a prisoner is sentenced to fewer than ten years in prison in Texas, he or she may stay in a county jail while his or her appeal occurs. As of 2000 Dunn was located in the Harris County Jail and Warzeka was in the Lucile Plane State Jail. Maddox and Warzeka were later moved to the Gatesville Unit (now the Christina Crain Unit).

Two of the girls had their first parole eligibility in 2003. Warzeka and Dunn were denied parole in 2003, and their only other eligible parole date was 2005. Their full sentence was to expire on August 4, 2006.

Dunn received her General Education Development (GED) diploma while in prison and began tertiary educational coursework there. While in prison Warzeka had received her GED, and then her associate's degree. The University of Texas had accepted her so she could do her studies for a bachelor's degree.

== Aftermath and legacy ==
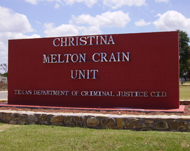
Christina Crain Unit, where several of the girls were held

After the incident occurred, Cynthia Calvert, the editor of the Kingwood Observer and a parent of a student at Kingwood High; and an official at the Humble Independent School District; as well as other people in the Kingwood community described the criminal incidents as, in the words of Dewan, "an anomaly". According to Helfgott, the news coverage of the crime exposed the prevalence of drug use in Kingwood and the notion that if the teenagers encountered any legal trouble, their parents would make the problems disappear.

Some newspapers referred to the crime as "Quentin Tarantino comes to Pleasantville".

In an opinion letter to the Houston Chronicle, member of Houston City Council Jolanda "Jo" Jones argued that the relatively lenient sentencing is an example of favorable treatment based on class in the Harris County legal system.

The film Sugar & Spice was loosely based on the incidents. Marla Sokoloff, one of the actresses, stated that "It's not the same, of course, yet I'm not sure if Sugar & Spice would have been made if that hadn't happened."
