= Tarkington Independent School District =

School district in Texas, United States

Address
- 2770 FM 163 Cleveland, Texas, 77327; United States

District information
- Type: Public
- Grades: PK–12
- Schools: 4
- NCES District ID: 4842210

Students and staff
- Students: 1,928 (2023–2024)
- Teachers: 118.24 (on an FTE basis) (2023–2024)
- Staff: 128.36 (on an FTE basis) (2023–2024)
- Student–teacher ratio: 16.31 (2023–2024)

Other information
- Website: www.tarkingtonisd.net

Tarkington Independent School District is a public school district in north central Liberty County, Texas (USA). All 4 campuses are located on the same plot of land, with the High School facing County Road 2268, and the other three campus are along Farm to Market Road 163. The district covers 238 square miles (620 km^{2}); and the schools are located seven miles (11 km) southeast of Cleveland and fifty miles northeast of Houston.

Small portions of Cleveland are in the district boundaries. The unincorporated communities served include Dolen, Hightower, Rayburn, and Tarkington Prairie.

The boundaries of the district are the Liberty/San Jacinto county line to the north, the Trinity River to the east, Luce Bayou to the south, and Tarkington Bayou to the east.

In 2009, the school district was rated "academically acceptable" by the Texas Education Agency.

One of the district trustees is Dwayne Stovall.

== Schools ==
- Tarkington High School (Class 4A; Grades 9–12)
  - In a nod to the two Texas flagship universities, the mascot is the Longhorn (the mascot of the University of Texas) and the school colors are maroon, white, and Vegas gold (maroon and white are the colors of Texas A&M).
- Tarkington Middle School (Grades 6–8)
- Tarkington Intermediate School (Grades 4–5)
- Tarkington Elementary School (Grades PK-3)

== History ==
The area that now constitutes the Tarkington Independent School District was settled in 1826 when the first settlers purchased land from the Mexican government and became ranchers. The flat, wooded land was once open prairie where cattle grazed. Tarkington Prairie settlers wanted their children to have a good education, so they built several different schools with colorful names such as Box Island, Little Flock, and Pelican.

The many smaller schools soon became five school districts: Dolen, Hightower, East Tarkington, North Tarkington, and West Tarkington. There was a rivalry among the schools in academic and sporting competitions.

The five districts consolidated into the Tarkington Consolidated School District in 1931. In 1954, Tarkington became an Independent School District and dropped "Consolidated" from its name. The number of students has grown, and the number of facilities has grown.

The old school building destroyed by fire in 1937 still stands in east Tarkington on County Road 2296.

== Operations ==
Circa 1995 the annual cost per student incurred by the district was $3,895; around that time the average per-student cost in Houston-area school districts was $4,000-$5,000.

== Notable alumni ==
Jason Grimsley - Retired Major League Baseball Player
