= Macedonia, Liberty County, Texas =

Human settlement in Texas, United States

Coordinates: 30°15′46″N 94°53′24″W

Macedonia is an unincorporated area in northern Liberty County, Texas, United States. Formerly a distinct community, it is located 5 miles (8.0 km) northeast of the junction of Texas State Highway 321 and Farm to Market Road 1008 and 16 miles (26 km) northwest of Liberty.

In 1914, a syndicate in Chicago, Illinois purchased 12,000 acres (4,900 ha) of land near the Beaumont, Sour Lake and Western Railway to form a community of Greek people that was intended to supply truck crops to supply the Galveston and Houston markets. The syndicate named the community "Macedonia," after a Baptist church in the area that had been established in 1845. Some Greek emigres worked at the local sawmills; the community did not organize in a manner that the founders had intended. A post office opened in 1915 and closed in 1922. Population estimates in subsequent decades ranged from 15 to 25. In the 1950s, the population was mostly African-American. In 1984, several scattered buildings and a church remained at the site. Its name is derived from the ancient Greek Kingdom of Macedonia.
