= Dolen, Texas =

Human settlement in Texas, United States

Coordinates: 30°25′31″N 94°53′52″W

Dolen is an unincorporated community in Liberty County, Texas, United States. The community is in northern Liberty County approximately 68 miles northwest of Beaumont.

== Education ==
Dolen is zoned to schools in the Tarkington Independent School District.
