= Hoop and Holler, Texas =

- Unincorporated community
- Location within Texas Location within the United States
- Coordinates: 30°28′06″N 94°44′36″W
- Country: United States
- State: Texas
- County: Liberty
- Elevation: 161 ft (49 m)
- Time zone: UTC-6 (Central (CST))
  - Summer (DST): UTC-5 (CDT)
- ZIP code: 77369
- Area code: 281
- GNIS feature ID: 1384197

Hoop and Holler is an unincorporated community in Liberty County, Texas, United States. Hoop and Holler is located in northeastern Liberty County, 20.2 miles (32.5 km) southeast of Livingston.

It has frequently been noted on lists of unusual place names.
