= Texas State Highway Spur 330 =

Highway in Texas

State Highway Spur 330
- Decker Drive

Route information
- Maintained by TxDOT
- Length: 5.805 mi (9.342 km)
- Existed: 1957–present

Major junctions
- East end: SH 146 in Baytown
- West end: I-10 at Lynchburg

Location
- Country: United States
- State: Texas

Highway system
- Highways in Texas; Interstate; US; State; Former; Toll; Loops; Spurs; FM/RM; Park; Rec
← Spur 329	→ Spur 331

Spur 330 is a freeway spur that connects Interstate 10 to SH 146 in Baytown, Texas, United States. This Spur runs parallel to Decker drive.

== Route description ==
Spur 330 begins at a partial interchange with I-10 at the eastern bank of the San Jacinto River at the small community of Lynchburg, heading southeast towards Baytown, ending at an interchange with SH 146 on the northwest side of the city.

== History ==
Spur 330 was designated on October 30, 1957 on a route from I-10 east of the San Jacinto River southeastward to at or near the intersection of Decker Drive and Airhart Drive. On November 20, 1973, Spur 330 was extended to Garth Road.

== Exit list ==
The entire route is in Harris County. All exits are unnumbered.

Location	mi	km	Destinations	Notes
Baytown–Highlands line	0.000	0.000	I-10 west – Houston	I-10 exit 788 eastbound
Baytown–Highlands line			Crosby-Lynchburg Road – Highlands	Westbound exit only
Baytown			I-10 east – Beaumont	I-10 exit 787 westbound; westbound exit and eastbound entrance
Baytown			Bayway Drive	
Baytown			Baker Road, Wade Road	Access to San Jacinto Methodist Hospital via Baker Road
Baytown			Rollingbrook Drive / San Jacinto Avenue	
Baytown			SH 146 – Baytown, La Porte	Former Loop 201
Baytown			East end of freeway	
Baytown			Airhart Drive / Decker Drive	
Baytown	5.805	9.342	Garth Road / Decker Drive	Eastbound exit and westbound entrance; eastern terminus
1.000 mi = 1.609 km; 1.000 km = 0.621 mi: Incomplete access
