= Stilson, Texas =

Human settlement in Texas, United States

Coordinates: 30°01′08″N 94°55′08″W

Stilson is an unincorporated community in Liberty County, Texas, United States.

== Education ==
Stilson is zoned to schools in the Dayton Independent School District.
