= Liberty County, Texas =

County in Texas, United States

- County
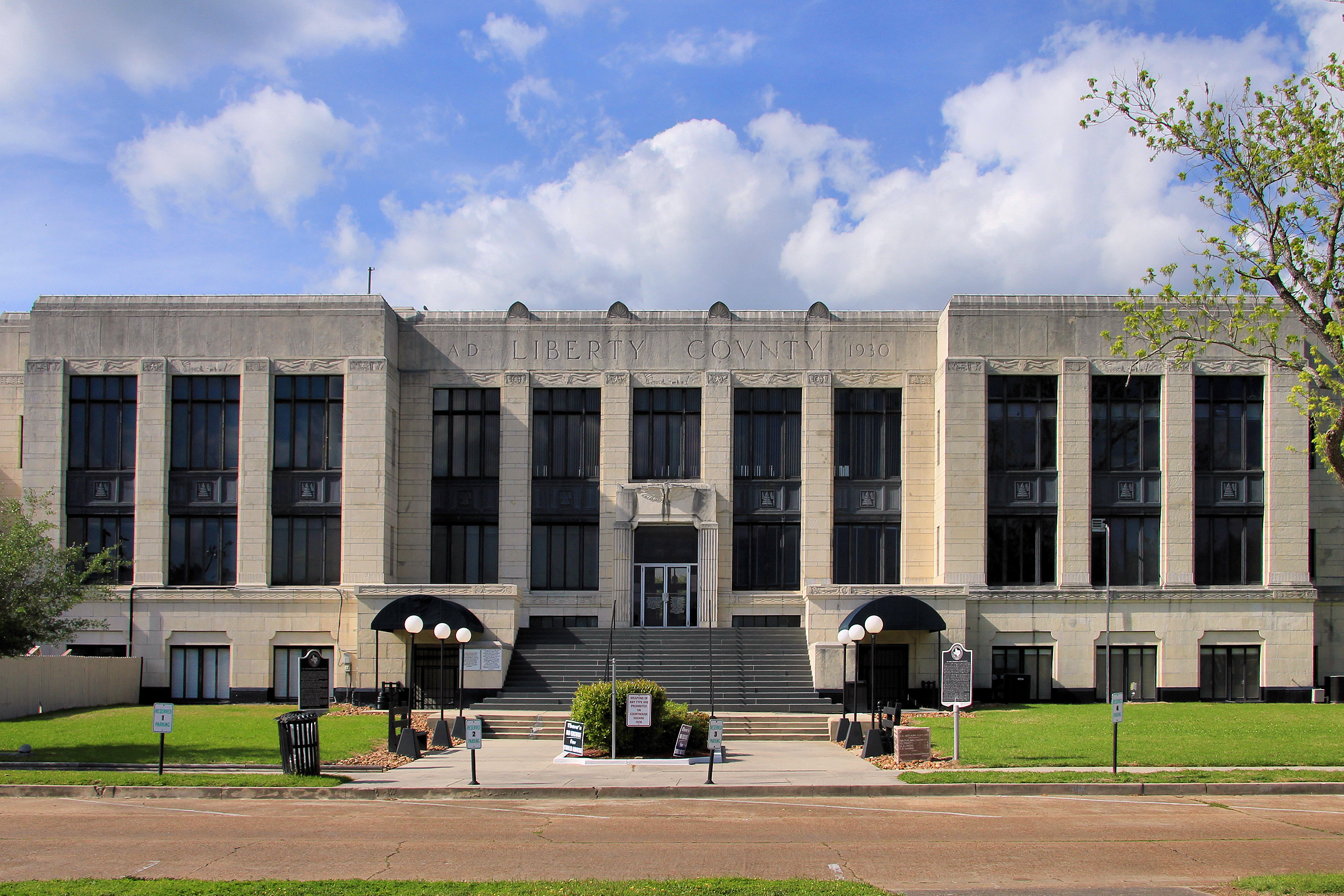
- The Liberty County Courthouse in Liberty

- Location within the U.S. state of Texas
- Coordinates: 30°09′N 94°49′W
- Country: United States
- State: Texas
- Founded: 1836
- Named for: Liberty
- Seat: Liberty
- Largest city: Dayton

Area
  - Total: 1,176 sq mi (3,050 km^{2})
  - Land: 1,158 sq mi (3,000 km^{2})
  - Water: 18 sq mi (47 km^{2}) 1.5%

Population (2020)
  - Total: 91,628
  - Estimate (2025): 121,364 ▲
  - Density: 79.13/sq mi (30.55/km^{2})
- Time zone: UTC−6 (Central)
  - Summer (DST): UTC−5 (CDT)
- Congressional district: 36th
- Website: www.co.liberty.tx.us

Liberty County is a county in the U.S. state of Texas. As of the 2020 census, its population was 91,628. The county seat is Liberty. It was founded in 1831, as a municipality in Mexico as Villa de la Santísima Trinidad de la Libertad by commissioner José Francisco Madero and organized as a county of the Republic of Texas in 1836. Its name was anglicized as Liberty based on the ideal of American liberty.

Liberty County is part of the Houston–Pasadena–The Woodlands metropolitan statistical area.

== Geography ==
According to the U.S. Census Bureau, the county has a total area of 1,176 sq mi (3,050 km^{2}), of which 18 sq mi (47 km^{2}) (1.5%) are covered by water.

The Trinity River flows through this county, dividing the county roughly in half. The river begins on the northern border of Liberty County, forming the San Jacinto - Polk County line through the Liberty County line. The east fork of the San Jacinto River flows through far northeast parts of the county, flowing through Cleveland. Tarkington Bayou begins in the Sam Houston National Forest in San Jacinto County, working its way south through northeast and east Liberty County and joining other feeders, before traveling into Harris County and emptying into Galveston Bay. The highest point in Liberty County is "Davis Hill", the roof of a salt dome in the northern part of the county.

=== Adjacent counties ===
- Polk County (north)
- Hardin County (east)
- Jefferson County (southeast)
- Chambers County (south)
- Harris County (southwest)
- Montgomery County (west)
- San Jacinto County (northwest)

=== National protected areas ===
- Big Thicket National Preserve (part)
- Trinity River National Wildlife Refuge

== Communities ==
=== Cities ===
- Ames
- Cleveland
- Daisetta
- Dayton
- Dayton Lakes
- Devers
- Hardin
- Liberty (county seat)
- Mont Belvieu (mostly in Chambers County)
- Nome
- North Cleveland
- Old River-Winfree (mostly in Chambers County)
- Plum Grove

=== Town ===
- Kenefick

=== Census-designated place ===
- Big Thicket Lake Estates (partly in Polk County)
- Hull

=== Unincorporated communities ===
- Colony Ridge
- Dolen
- Eastgate
- Hightower
- Hoop and Holler
- Macedonia
- Moss Bluff
- Moss Hill
- Rayburn
- Raywood
- Romayor
- Rye
- Stilson
- Tarkington Prairie

== Demographics ==
Historical population
Census	Pop.	Note	%±
1850	2,522		—
1860	3,189		26.4%
1870	4,414		38.4%
1880	4,999		13.3%
1890	4,230		−15.4%
1900	8,102		91.5%
1910	10,686		31.9%
1920	14,637		37.0%
1930	19,868		35.7%
1940	24,541		23.5%
1950	26,729		8.9%
1960	31,595		18.2%
1970	33,014		4.5%
1980	47,088		42.6%
1990	52,726		12.0%
2000	70,154		33.1%
2010	75,643		7.8%
2020	91,628		21.1%
2025 (est.)	121,364	▲	32.5%
U.S. Decennial Census; 1850–2010 2010 2020

=== Racial and ethnic composition ===
Liberty County, Texas – Racial and ethnic composition Note: the US Census treats Hispanic/Latino as an ethnic category. This table excludes Latinos from the racial categories and assigns them to a separate category. Hispanics/Latinos may be of any race.
Race / Ethnicity (NH = Non-Hispanic)	Pop 1980	Pop 1990	Pop 2000	Pop 2010	Pop 2020	% 1980	% 1990	% 2000	% 2010	% 2020
White alone (NH)	39,117	42,699	52,289	52,321	50,044	83.07%	80.98%	74.53%	69.17%	54.62%
Black or African American alone (NH)	6,680	6,821	8,952	8,074	7,024	14.19%	12.94%	12.76%	10.67%	7.67%
Native American or Alaska Native alone (NH)	113	144	284	289	291	0.24%	0.27%	0.40%	0.38%	0.32%
Asian alone (NH)	57	116	218	337	466	0.12%	0.22%	0.31%	0.45%	0.51%
Native Hawaiian or Pacific Islander alone (NH)	x	x	18	23	12	x	x	0.03%	0.03%	0.01%
Other race alone (NH)	68	66	69	120	329	0.14%	0.13%	0.10%	0.16%	0.36%
Mixed race or Multiracial (NH)	x	x	664	877	2,665	x	x	0.95%	1.16%	2.91%
Hispanic or Latino (any race)	1,053	2,880	7,660	13,602	30,797	2.24%	5.46%	10.92%	17.98%	33.61%
Total	47,088	52,726	70,154	75,643	91,628	100.00%	100.00%	100.00%	100.00%	100.00%

=== 2020 census ===
As of the 2020 census, the county had a population of 91,628. The median age was 35.8 years. 26.5% of residents were under the age of 18 and 13.1% of residents were 65 years of age or older. For every 100 females there were 98.2 males, and for every 100 females age 18 and over there were 95.8 males age 18 and over.

The racial makeup of the county was 61.0% White, 7.8% Black or African American, 1.2% American Indian and Alaska Native, 0.5% Asian, <0.1% Native Hawaiian and Pacific Islander, 18.2% from some other race, and 11.2% from two or more races. Hispanic or Latino residents of any race comprised 33.6% of the population.

22.6% of residents lived in urban areas, while 77.4% lived in rural areas.

There were 29,469 households in the county, of which 38.9% had children under the age of 18 living in them. Of all households, 53.5% were married-couple households, 17.3% were households with a male householder and no spouse or partner present, and 22.8% were households with a female householder and no spouse or partner present. About 21.2% of all households were made up of individuals and 9.6% had someone living alone who was 65 years of age or older.

There were 33,182 housing units, of which 11.2% were vacant. Among occupied housing units, 77.7% were owner-occupied and 22.3% were renter-occupied. The homeowner vacancy rate was 1.5% and the rental vacancy rate was 9.7%.

=== 2000 census ===
As of the 2000 census, 70,154 people, 23,242 households, and 17,756 families resided in the county. The population density was 60 people per square mile (23 people/km^{2}). The 26,359 housing units averaged 23 units per square mile (8.9/km^{2}).

The racial makeup of the county was 78.90% White, 12.82% African American, 0.47% Native American, 0.32% Asian, 6.06% from other races, and 1.43% from two or more races. About 10.92% of the population was Hispanic or Latino of any race.

Of the 23,242 households, 38.10% had children under 18 living with them, 60.50% were married couples living together, 11.40% had a female householder with no husband present, and 23.60% were not families. About 20.40% of all households were made up of individuals, and 8.90% had someone living alone who was 65 or older. The average household size was 2.80 and the average family size was 3.23.

In the county, the population was distributed as 27.60% under18, 9.20% from 18 to 24, 31.60% from 25 to 44, 21.40% from 45 to 64, and 10.30% who were 65 years of age or older. The median age was 34 years. For every 100 females, there were 95.70 males. For every 100 females age 18 and over, there were 92.40 males.

The median income for a household in the county was $38,361, and for a family was $43,744. Males had a median income of $37,957 versus $22,703 for females. The per capita income for the county was $15,539. About 11.10% of families and 14.30% of the population were below the poverty line, including 18.30% of those under age 18 and 15.00% of those age 65 or over.

Of Liberty County's residents, 8.8% have a college degree, the lowest percentage of any U.S. county with a population exceeding 50,000.

== Government and politics ==
Liberty County, formerly strongly Democratic like much of the rest of Texas before the mid-20th century, has trended sharply Republican in recent years. As is the case with most rural Texas counties, the Republican margin of victory has largely increased since Bill Clinton won the county in the 1990s.

In the 2020 United States presidential election, a little under 80% of the votes in this county were for Donald Trump and in 2024 over 80% of the votes in this county were for Donald Trump. In 2023, the Associated Press described the county as "a Republican stronghold".

United States presidential election results for Liberty County, Texas
Year	Republican		Democratic		Third party(ies)	
Year	No.	%	No.	%	No.	%
1912	81	9.52%	584	68.63%	186	21.86%
1916	235	22.93%	704	68.68%	86	8.39%
1924	639	29.19%	1,506	68.80%	44	2.01%
1928	1,070	53.63%	918	46.02%	7	0.35%
1932	247	8.83%	2,527	90.38%	22	0.79%
1936	244	7.95%	2,813	91.69%	11	0.36%
1940	497	12.53%	3,458	87.19%	11	0.28%
1944	336	9.73%	2,561	74.12%	558	16.15%
1948	735	18.76%	2,199	56.14%	983	25.10%
1952	4,106	53.01%	3,632	46.89%	8	0.10%
1956	4,129	63.49%	2,318	35.65%	56	0.86%
1960	3,361	45.76%	3,902	53.12%	82	1.12%
1964	2,884	34.93%	5,357	64.88%	16	0.19%
1968	2,746	28.58%	3,469	36.11%	3,393	35.31%
1972	6,111	64.79%	3,311	35.10%	10	0.11%
1976	4,552	38.89%	7,086	60.54%	66	0.56%
1980	6,470	47.71%	6,810	50.22%	281	2.07%
1984	10,504	62.28%	6,292	37.31%	70	0.42%
1988	8,524	50.22%	8,343	49.15%	106	0.62%
1992	6,959	37.95%	7,036	38.37%	4,344	23.69%
1996	7,784	46.41%	6,877	41.00%	2,112	12.59%
2000	12,458	62.05%	7,311	36.41%	308	1.53%
2004	14,821	68.33%	6,780	31.26%	90	0.41%
2008	15,448	71.23%	5,991	27.62%	248	1.14%
2012	17,323	76.16%	5,202	22.87%	221	0.97%
2016	18,892	77.85%	4,862	20.04%	513	2.11%
2020	23,302	79.44%	5,785	19.72%	247	0.84%
2024	25,241	80.58%	5,952	19.00%	130	0.42%

United States Senate election results for Liberty County, Texas1
Year	Republican		Democratic		Third party(ies)	
Year	No.	%	No.	%	No.	%
2024	8,915	81.46%	1,378	12.59%	651	5.95%

United States Senate election results for Liberty County, Texas2
Year	Republican		Democratic		Third party(ies)	
Year	No.	%	No.	%	No.	%
2020	22,743	78.40%	5,662	19.52%	604	2.08%

Texas Gubernatorial election results for Liberty County
Year	Republican		Democratic		Third party(ies)	
Year	No.	%	No.	%	No.	%
2022	16,080	81.25%	3,488	17.62%	223	1.13%

=== United States Congress ===
Senators	Name	Party	First Elected	Level
Senate Class 1	John Cornyn	Republican	2002	Senior Senator
Senate Class 2	Ted Cruz	Republican	2012	Junior Senator
Representatives	Name	Party	First Elected	Area(s) of Liberty County Represented
District 36	Brian Babin	Republican	2014	Countywide

=== Texas Legislature ===
==== Texas Senate ====
- District 3: Robert Nichols (R)- first elected in 2006

==== Texas House of Representatives ====
District 18: Ernest Bailes (R) - first elected in 2016

=== Commissioners' court ===
Commissioners	Name	Party
County Judge	Jay Knight	Republican
Precinct 1	Bruce Karbowski	Republican
Precinct 2	Greg Arthur	Republican
Precinct 3	David Whitmire	Republican
Precinct 4	Leon Wilson	Republican

=== County officials ===
Office	Name	Party
County Attorney	Matthew Poston	Republican
County Clerk	Lee Haidusek Chambers	Republican
District Attorney	Jennifer Bergman	Republican
District Clerk	Donna Brown	Republican
Sheriff	Bobby Rader	Republican
Tax Assessor-Collector	Ricky Brown	Republican
Treasurer	Kim Harris	Republican

Position	Official	Party
Constable Precinct 1	Tammy Bishop	Republican
Constable Precinct 2	Leslie Hulsey	Democrat
Constable Precinct 3	Mark "Mad Dog" Davison	Republican
Constable Precinct 4	Robbie Thornton	Republican
Constable Precinct 5	David Hunter	Republican
Constable Precinct 6	Zack Harkness	Republican
Justice Of The Peace Precinct 1	Stephen Hebert	Republican
Justice Of The Peace Precinct 2	Ronnie E. Davis	Democrat
Justice Of The Peace Precinct 3	Cody Parrish	Democrat
Justice Of The Peace Precinct 4	Larry Wilburn	Republican
Justice Of The Peace Precinct 5	Wade Brown	Republican
Justice Of The Peace Precinct 6	Ralph Fuller	Republican

== Economy ==
Around 1995, the economy of Liberty County was mainly focused on agriculture and oil. As of that year, the economy of Liberty County was struggling. At that time, the Texas Department of Criminal Justice had established four correctional facilities (Cleveland, Henley, Hightower, and Plane) in the county within a six-year span. As of 1995, the facilities employed 1,045 employees and contributed $22 million in the county's annual payroll. Since Cleveland is a privately operated facility, the county receives tax revenue from the prison's operation.

== Education ==
School districts include:

- Cleveland ISD (portions of the district extend into other counties)
- Dayton ISD (portions of the district extend into another county)
- Devers ISD
- Hardin ISD
- Hull-Daisetta ISD
- Liberty ISD
- Tarkington ISD

Sections in Dayton, Devers, Hardin, Hull-Daisetta, and Liberty school districts are assigned to Lee College. Sections in the Cleveland and Tarkington school districts are assigned to Lone Star College.

The Sam Houston Regional Library and Research Center, operated by the Texas State Library and Archives Commission, is located 3 miles (4.8 km) north of Liberty in an unincorporated area. Judge and Mrs. Price Daniel donated 114 acres (46 ha) of land for the purpose of establishing a library on September 27, 1973. Construction began in the fall of 1975; by then, $700,000 had been raised through private donations. The library opened on May 14, 1977.

== Infrastructure ==
Outside of the city limits, ambulance services are provided by contract through Allegiance EMS. Fire protection is provided mostly through volunteer fire departments, four of which in Liberty County are funded by emergency services districts.

=== Police services ===
The headquarters of the Liberty County Sheriff's Office, which serves unincorporated areas and supplements police forces of incorporated areas, is within the city of Liberty. Most incorporated areas operate their own police departments, including Cleveland, Daisetta, Dayton, Kenefick, and Liberty.

Liberty County also has a constable for each of its six precincts and deputies assigned to each.

=== Fire services ===
Incorporated cities of Cleveland and Liberty operate their own fire departments staffed by a combination of paid and volunteer members. Both departments cover territory outside their respective city limits.

Fire departments serving unincorporated areas:

- Ames VFD 1 station
- Cleveland VFD 2 stations (Covering areas inside the City of Cleveland and North Cleveland, and unincorporated Liberty County)
- Cypress Lakes VFD 1 station
- Dayton VFD 2 stations (covering areas inside the City of Dayton, and unincorporated Liberty County)
- Devers VFD 1 station
- Hardin VFD 1 station (covering areas inside the City of Hardin, and unincorporated Liberty County)
- Highway 321 VFD 1 station
- Hull-Daisetta VFD 1 station (covering areas inside the City of Daisetta, and unincorporated Liberty County)
- Kenefick VFD 1 station (covering areas inside the City of Kenefick, and unincorporated Liberty County)
- Liberty VFD 1 station (covering areas inside the City of Liberty, and unincorporated Liberty County)
- Moss Bluff VFD 1 station
- North Liberty County VFD 1 station
- Plum Grove VFD 1 station (covering areas inside the City of Plum Grove, and unincorporated Liberty County)
- Raywood VFD 1 Station
- Tarkington VFD 2 stations
- Westlake VFD 1 station
- Woodpecker VFD 1 station

=== Emergency medical services ===
Emergency medical services are provided by Allegiance EMS, with the only exception being inside the City of Liberty, for which service is provided by the City of Liberty Fire and EMS Department.

=== Corrections ===
The Texas Department of Criminal Justice operates one women's prison and two women's state jails, all co-located in an unincorporated area. The L.V. Hightower Unit prison and the Dempsie Henley Unit and Lucille G. Plane Unit jails are 4 miles (6.4 km) north of Dayton. The Cleveland Unit, a prison for men privately operated by the GEO Group, Inc. on behalf of the TDCJ, is in Cleveland.

Cleveland opened in September 1989. Hightower opened in March 1990. Henley and Plane opened in May 1995. Also, in 1992 Community Education Centers opened a private detention center under federal contract with the United States Marshals Service for 372 beds, co-located at the old decommissioned Liberty County Jail.

As of 1995, of all Texas counties, Liberty County had the fourth-largest number of state prisons and jails, after Walker, Brazoria, and Coryell Counties.

== Transportation ==
=== Major highways ===
- Interstate 69/U.S. Highway 59
- U.S. Highway 90
- State Highway 61
- State Highway 99 (Grand Parkway)
- State Highway 105
- State Highway 146
- State Highway 321
- Loop 227
- Loop 573

=== Aviation ===
Two general aviation airports are located in unincorporated sections of the county.

- Liberty Municipal Airport is located east of Liberty.
- Cleveland Municipal Airport is located east of Cleveland.

The Houston Airport System stated that Liberty County is within the primary service area of George Bush Intercontinental Airport, an international airport in Houston in Harris County.

=== Toll roads ===
Liberty County Toll Road Authority

Authority overview
- Formed: July 2007
- Jurisdiction: Liberty County, Texas
- Headquarters: Liberty County Commissioners Court

The Liberty County Toll Road Authority does not operate any toll roads at present. In July 2007, Liberty County created the Liberty County Toll Road Authority to have a say in any and all future toll-road projects located within the county.

== Crime ==
In 2023, Zack Harkness, a constable of Liberty County, stated that the Aryan Brotherhood is the most significant gang in Liberty County, more so than any of Hispanic and Latino origin. The crime rate in Liberty County is 46.77 per 1,000 residents.

== Notable people ==
- William Fields (1810-1858), American politician
- Edward Bradford Pickett (1823–1882), president of the Texas Constitutional Convention of 1875 and state legislator
- Bobby Seale, co-founder of the Black Panther Party

== See also ==
- List of museums in the Texas Gulf Coast
- National Register of Historic Places listings in Liberty County, Texas
- Recorded Texas Historic Landmarks Liberty County
