= Cleveland Unit =

Prison for men in Cleveland, Texas, US

Oliver J. Bell Unit
- Location in Texas
- Location: 901 E 5th St Cleveland, Texas 77327; 30°21′54″N 95°04′22″W
- Status: Operational
- Security class: G1, G2
- Capacity: 520
- Opened: September 1989
- Former name: Cleveland Correctional Center
- Managed by: Texas Department of Criminal Justice (as of 2023)
- Warden: Tina Tompkins
- Website: www.tdcj.texas.gov/unit_directory/cv.html

The Oliver J. Bell Unit is a prison for men in Cleveland, Texas, operated by Texas Department of Criminal Justice (TDCJ). The roughly 40-acre (16 ha) facility is .25 mi (0.40 km) north of downtown Cleveland. The TDCJ refers to the prison as the "Oliver J. Bell Unit", while GEO Group, the former operator, referred to it as the Cleveland Correctional Center. The facility is along U.S. Route 59.

== History ==
Corrections Corporation of America (CCA) proposed a prerelease center along Atascocita Road in the Humble, Texas, area. The local population opposed the measure. CCA instead planned to open a facility in Cleveland, where the local leaders were more receptive to the plan. The Cleveland Unit, then a $12 million ($24,000,000 when adjusted for inflation), 500-bed prerelease unit, officially opened on September 28, 1989. As of that year, it was the fourth of the four privately operated prisons to be built in Texas.

Cleveland became a GEO Group facility on January 1, 1999. As of September 1, 2015. MTC took over operations of the Cleveland facility. In September 2023, The Texas Department of Criminal Justice took over the full operation of the Bell Unit.

Cleveland prison renamed the Oliver J. Bell Unit in honor of former TBCJ chairman in March 2020. https://www.tdcj.texas.gov/unit_directory/cv.html

== Operations ==
The 40-acre (16 ha) site, located along the Piney Woods along U.S. 59, has a 124,000-square-foot (11,500 m^{2}) prison facility. Cindy Horswell of the Houston Chronicle said that the "unobtrusive" unit with "its concrete walls and bright blue entry would look like any other office building except for the high barbed-wire fence and 53 security cameras." Since the prison is a private facility, the operators pay local taxes. The prison accepts minimum-security male prisoners who are within three years of parole.
