= Hull, Texas =

- Census-designated place
- Location within Texas Location within the United States
- Coordinates: 30°08′47″N 94°38′32″W
- Country: United States
- State: Texas
- County: Liberty

Area
  - Total: 2.02 sq mi (5.22 km^{2})
  - Land: 1.99 sq mi (5.16 km^{2})
  - Water: 0.023 sq mi (0.06 km^{2})
- Elevation: 66 ft (20 m)

Population (2010)
  - Total: 669
  - Density: 336/sq mi (129.6/km^{2})
- Time zone: UTC-6 (Central (CST))
  - Summer (DST): UTC-5 (CDT)
- ZIP Code: 77564
- FIPS code: 48-35324
- GNIS feature ID: 2586940

Hull is an unincorporated community and census-designated place (CDP) in Liberty County, Texas, United States. It was named after W. F. Hull, a railroad official. As of the 2020 census, Hull had a population of 522.

== Geography ==
Hull is in eastern Liberty County, 13 miles (21 km) northeast of the city of Liberty, the county seat. According to the U.S. Census Bureau, the Hull CDP has a total area of 2.0 square miles (5.2 km^{2}), of which 0.02 square miles (0.06 km^{2}), or 1.07%, are water.

== Demographics ==
Historical population
Census	Pop.	Note	%±
2010	669		—
2020	522		−22.0%
U.S. Decennial Census; 1850–1900 1910; 1920 1930 1940; 1950 1960 1970; 1980 1990 2000; 2010 2020

Hull first appeared as a census designated place in the 2010 U.S. census.

=== 2020 census ===
Hull CDP, Texas – Racial and ethnic composition Note: the US Census treats Hispanic/Latino as an ethnic category. This table excludes Latinos from the racial categories and assigns them to a separate category. Hispanics/Latinos may be of any race.
Race / Ethnicity (NH = Non-Hispanic)	Pop 2010	Pop 2020	% 2010	% 2020
White alone (NH)	641	470	95.81%	90.04%
Black or African American alone (NH)	3	4	0.45%	0.77%
Native American or Alaska Native alone (NH)	2	1	0.30%	0.19%
Asian alone (NH)	0	1	0.00%	0.19%
Native Hawaiian or Pacific Islander alone (NH)	1	0	0.15%	0.00%
Other race alone (NH)	0	4	0.00%	0.77%
Mixed race or Multiracial (NH)	4	15	0.60%	2.87%
Hispanic or Latino (any race)	18	27	2.69%	5.17%
Total	669	522	100.00%	100.00%

== Education ==
Hull is zoned to schools in the Hull-Daisetta Independent School District.

Residents of Hull-Daisetta ISD are zoned to Lee College.
