= Rayburn, Texas =

Human settlement in Texas, United States

Coordinates: 30°24′49″N 94°55′28″W

Rayburn is an unincorporated community in Liberty County, Texas, United States.

== Education ==
Rayburn is zoned to schools in the Tarkington Independent School District.
