= Stilson Canyon =

Coordinates: 39.7331°N 121.7725°W

Stilson Canyon is a small gorge at the base of the Sierra Nevada in Butte County, California.

Little Chico Creek which serves as the dividing line between the Sierra Nevada mountain range and the Cascade Range flows through it and passes by a small community of homes built along a portion of the canyon.
