= Bammel, Texas =

Unincorporated community in Texas, US

Coordinates: 30°00′25″N 95°27′49″W

Bammel is an unincorporated community in Harris County, Texas, United States.

Bammel, eighteen miles north of downtown Houston at the intersection of Farm-to-Market Road 1960 (FM 1960) and Kuykendahl Road in north central Harris County, was established after the neighboring towns of Klein, Westfield, and Spring. It was named for Charles Bammel, a German Houstonian who built the Bammel and Kuehnle Merchandise store with his partner in 1915 and moved to the community for health reasons. A Bammel post office, for which Herman Kuehnle was the first postmaster, operated from 1916 until 1929. Bammel's store burned in 1927 but was later rebuilt to serve the new Bammel Forest subdivision. The town's population was reported as roughly fifty from 1929 until oil was discovered in the area in 1938. In 1943, the community reported two stores and a population of 200, but in 1949 its population was estimated at twenty. During the 1980s Bammel's residents were mainly commuters who worked in Houston. The community included two shopping centers, several schools, a hospital, and nearby cemeteries.

== Education ==
Spring Independent School District operates schools in the area.

In the 1900s, one school had 30 children taught by one teacher. The building was donated by a man named Mr. Harrell. A fire burned the building, and men from Spring helped rebuild the school. In 1900, a one-room school opened on the Bender Estate. One year later, it moved to Spring.

== Economy ==
The Bammel Gas Storage facility is one of the largest underground reservoir storage facilities in North America and is strategically located on the HPL gas pipeline system. Its capabilities include 118 billion cubic feet (BCF) of storage. The Houston Ship Channel and Houston's gas distribution company are important markets for gas stored at the Bammel facility. The facility was purchased by American Electric Power from Enron in 2001.
