= Kenefick, Texas =

- Town
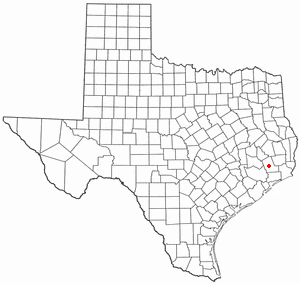
- Location of Kenefick, Texas

- Coordinates: 30°07′05″N 94°52′10″W
- Country: United States
- State: Texas
- County: Liberty

Area
  - Total: 1.56 sq mi (4.03 km^{2})
  - Land: 1.55 sq mi (4.02 km^{2})
  - Water: 0.0039 sq mi (0.01 km^{2})
- Elevation: 69 ft (21 m)

Population (2020)
  - Total: 615
  - Density: 396/sq mi (153/km^{2})
- Time zone: UTC-6 (Central (CST))
  - Summer (DST): UTC-5 (CDT)
- ZIP code: 77535
- Area code: 936
- FIPS code: 48-38872
- GNIS feature ID: 2412826
- Website: cityofkenefick.gov

Kenefick is a town in Liberty County, Texas, United States. The population was 615 at the 2020 census.

== Geography ==
According to the United States Census Bureau, the town has a total area of 1.5 square miles (3.9 km^{2}), of which 1.5 square miles (3.9 km^{2}) is land and 0.65% is water,

== Demographics ==
Historical population
| Census | Pop. | Note | %± |
|---|---|---|---|
| 1970 | 205 | | — |
| 1980 | 763 | | 272.2% |
| 1990 | 435 | | −43.0% |
| 2000 | 667 | | 53.3% |
| 2010 | 563 | | −15.6% |
| 2020 | 615 | | 9.2% |
U.S. Decennial Census; 1850–1900 1910; 1920 1930 1940; 1950 1960 1970; 1980 1990 2000; 2010 2020

As of the census of 2000, there were 667 people, 235 households, and 195 families residing in the town. The population density was 437.7 inhabitants per square mile (169.0/km^{2}). There were 255 housing units at an average density of 167.3 per square mile (64.6/km^{2}). The racial makeup of the town was 98.05% White, 0.30% Native American, 0.30% Asian, 0.60% from other races, and 0.75% from two or more races. Hispanic or Latino of any race were 1.65% of the population.

There were 235 households, out of which 38.7% had children under the age of 18 living with them, 73.2% were married couples living together, 7.2% had a female householder with no husband present, and 16.6% were non-families. 11.5% of all households were made up of individuals, and 4.3% had someone living alone who was 65 years of age or older. The average household size was 2.84 and the average family size was 3.04.

In the town, the population was spread out, with 28.6% under the age of 18, 6.1% from 18 to 24, 27.6% from 25 to 44, 27.7% from 45 to 64, and 9.9% who were 65 years of age or older. The median age was 37 years.

The median income for a household in the town was $47,857, and the median income for a family was $52,083. Males had a median income of $45,481 versus $26,513 for females. The per capita income for the town was $17,146. About 8.5% of families and 8.8% of the population were below the poverty line, including 7.7% of those under age 18 and 11.0% of those age 65 or over.

In 1954, Rev. William Bythel Hagee (father of John Hagee), was called to the ministry. Previously William Hagee had been a refinery worker at the Humble Oil Refinery in Baytown, Texas. He set up a Tent Revival at David Parker's family property in Kenefick in order to start his ministry. This was the beginning of the Assembly of God Church in Kenefick and the beginning of Pastor John Hagee's legacy.

== Education ==
Kenefick is served by the Dayton Independent School District.

Residents of Dayton ISD are zoned to Lee College.
