= L.V. Hightower Unit =

Prison in Texas, United States

- Location in Texas
- Location: 902 FM 686 Dayton, Texas 77535; 30°06′16″N 94°56′01″W
- Status: Operational
- Security class: G1, G2, G4
- Capacity: 1,384
- Opened: March 1990; 36 years ago
- Managed by: TDCJ Correctional Institutions Division
- Warden: Kilven Cuba
- Website: www.tdcj.state.tx.us/unit_directory../hi.html

The L. V. Hightower Unit (HI) or Hightower Unit is a prison in Texas, United States, within the Texas Department of Corrections system. It is located in unincorporated Liberty County, near Dayton, Texas. It is named for Lockhart V. Hightower, former sheriff and county clerk of Liberty County.
