= Texas State Highway 321 =

State highway in Texas

State Highway 321
- SH 321, highlighted in red

Route information
- Maintained by TxDOT
- Length: 20.29 mi (32.65 km)
- Existed: 1939–present

Major junctions
- South end: US 90 / SH 146 at Dayton
- SH 105 at Cleveland
- North end: Loop 573 at Cleveland

Location
- Country: United States
- State: Texas

Highway system
- Highways in Texas; Interstate; US; State; Former; Toll; Loops; Spurs; FM/RM; Park; Rec
← SH 320	→ SH 322

State Highway 321 (SH 321) is a north–south highway in southeastern Texas, starting at US 90 in Dayton and ending at Loop 573 in Cleveland. The route was designated on October 30, 1939.

In Cleveland, SH 321 is also known as Houston Street, providing the main street for downtown Cleveland. It is a two lane urban highway with a left turn lane as it travels throughout Cleveland, until roughly 3/4 of a mile northeast of the city limit. From Loop 573, on southward until junction with SH 105, SH 321 is also known as SH 105. In the city of Dayton, it is referred to as North Cleveland Street, passing through residential Dayton as a 4-lane urban highway, before narrowing back down to a 2-lane rural State Highway.

SH 321 is part of the eastern Greater Houston area evacuation route, providing a corridor for communities such as Baytown, Kemah, and Pasadena.

== History ==
Based on Handbook of Texas article about Tarkington Prairie, SH 321 is believed to cover part of the Nacogdoches-Lynchburg trail, being the Old Wells store (as it is referred to on the historical marker) sits along the trail, and SH 321 runs directly in front of the building.

=== Historical markers ===
- Old Wells Store, Tarkington Prairie: Roughly 7 miles (11 km) southeast of Cleveland where CR 2274 meets SH 321.
- Burton B. Tarkington, Tarkington Prairie: Roughly 5.5 miles (8.9 km) southeast of Cleveland in front of the Tarkington Volunteer Fire Department, near CR 2249 and CR 2250 on SH 321.
- John Cherry, Ryan Cemetery: on SH 321, 13 miles (21 km) southeast of Cleveland.

== Route Description ==
The southern terminus of SH 321 is at US 90 near downtown Dayton. As its travels north, it carries the street name North Cleveland Street, immediately north of US 90 is the Union Pacific Lafayette subdivision, which SH 321 crosses by an underpass under the railroad right of way. FM 1960 terminates at the next intersection, as well as is the southern terminus of FM 1008. SH 321 continues northward through the neighborhoods of Dayton as a 4-lane highway, eventually changing to a 2-lane rural road, then has 2 directional overpasses over the Union Pacific Beaumont subdivision rail line. The eastern terminus of FM 686 occurs just inside the northern edge of Dayton city limit. To the west of SH 321 is 3 Texas Department of Criminal Justice units; Plane State Jail, Henley State Jail, and the Hightower Unit. The road continues north through rural Liberty County and meets again with the northern terminus of FM 1008. Continuing north SH 321 passes FM 163, and a mile later becomes a concurrent route with SH 105. As it joins SH 105, the route turns west then northwest as it approaches the city of Cleveland, where is it known as Houston Street. Just inside of the Cleveland City limit, Business SH 105 cuts south around the city. As SH 321 nears the terminus, the route passes FM 787 and FM 1010. One block before the terminus in downtown Cleveland the route crosses Union Pacific Rabbit line. SH 321 then reaches its terminus at Loop 573, while SH 105 turns south and become concurrent with Loop 573.

== Ghost towns ==
Martha is on State Highway 321, three miles (4.8 km) north of Dayton.

Lyric was 3.5 miles (5.6 km) south of the route of present-day SH 321, ten miles (16 km) east of Cleveland.

Macedonia is five miles (8.0 km) northeast of the junction of SH 321 and FM 1008 sixteen miles northwest of Liberty.

== Future ==
The Houston-Galveston Area Council long term plans (by 2025) show plans to expand SH 321 to an urban four lane divided highway with left turn lane, south out of Cleveland until SH 105 cuts east (6–8 miles south of Cleveland).

== Junction list ==
The entire route is in Liberty County.

Location	mi	km	Destinations	Notes
Dayton			South Cleveland Street	Continuation south of US 90/SH 146
Dayton			US 90 / SH 146 – Liberty, Crosby, Baytown	
Dayton			FM 1008 north / FM 1960 west (Clayton Street) – Kenefick, Huffman, Humble	
Dayton			FM 686	
			FM 1008 – Kenefick	
			FM 163 – Tarkington Prairie	
			SH 105 east – Beaumont	South end of SH 105 concurrency
Cleveland			SH 105 west / Bus. SH 105 west – Conroe	North end of SH 105 concurrency; south end of SH 105 Business concurrency
Cleveland			FM 787 (Bonham Avenue)	Former SH 105
Cleveland			FM 1010 (College Avenue)	
Cleveland			Loop 573 (Washington Avenue) / Bus. SH 105 west	Former alignment of US 59; north end of SH 105 Business concurrency; westbound SH 105 Business continues via Loop 573 south
Cleveland			West Houston Street	Continuation west of Loop 573
1.000 mi = 1.609 km; 1.000 km = 0.621 mi: Concurrency terminus

== Sources ==
- Ghost towns
  - Handbook of Texas Online, s.v. "," http://www.tshaonline.org/handbook/online/articles/hvm39 (accessed December 24, 2006).
  - Handbook of Texas Online, s.v. "," http://www.tshaonline.org/handbook/online/articles/hvlac (accessed December 24, 2006).
- Historical markers
  - Handbook of Texas Online, s.v. "," http://www.tshaonline.org/handbook/online/articles/hrt04 (accessed December 24, 2006).
  - https://web.archive.org/web/20110707072243/http://www.9key.com/markers/marker_detail.asp?atlas_number=5291009692
  - https://web.archive.org/web/20110707072246/http://www.9key.com/markers/marker_detail.asp?atlas_number=5291009689
