= Cleveland Municipal Airport (Texas) =

- IATA: none; ICAO: none; FAA LID: 6R3

Summary
- Airport type: Public
- Owner: City of Cleveland
- Serves: Cleveland
- Location: Cleveland, Texas
- Elevation AMSL: 150 ft / 46 m
- Coordinates: 30°21′23″N 095°00′29″W
- Interactive map of Cleveland Municipal Airport

Runways
Direction	Length		Surface
Direction	ft	m	Surface
16/34	4,998	1,523	Asphalt
- Source: AirNav

Cleveland Municipal Airport (FAA LID: 6R3) is a general aviation airport located 4 miles northeast of Cleveland, Texas, United States.

The designated Area Control Center (ARTCC) is Houston Air Route Traffic Control Center.

== See also ==
- List of airports in Texas
