= Dayton, Texas =

City of Dayton
- City
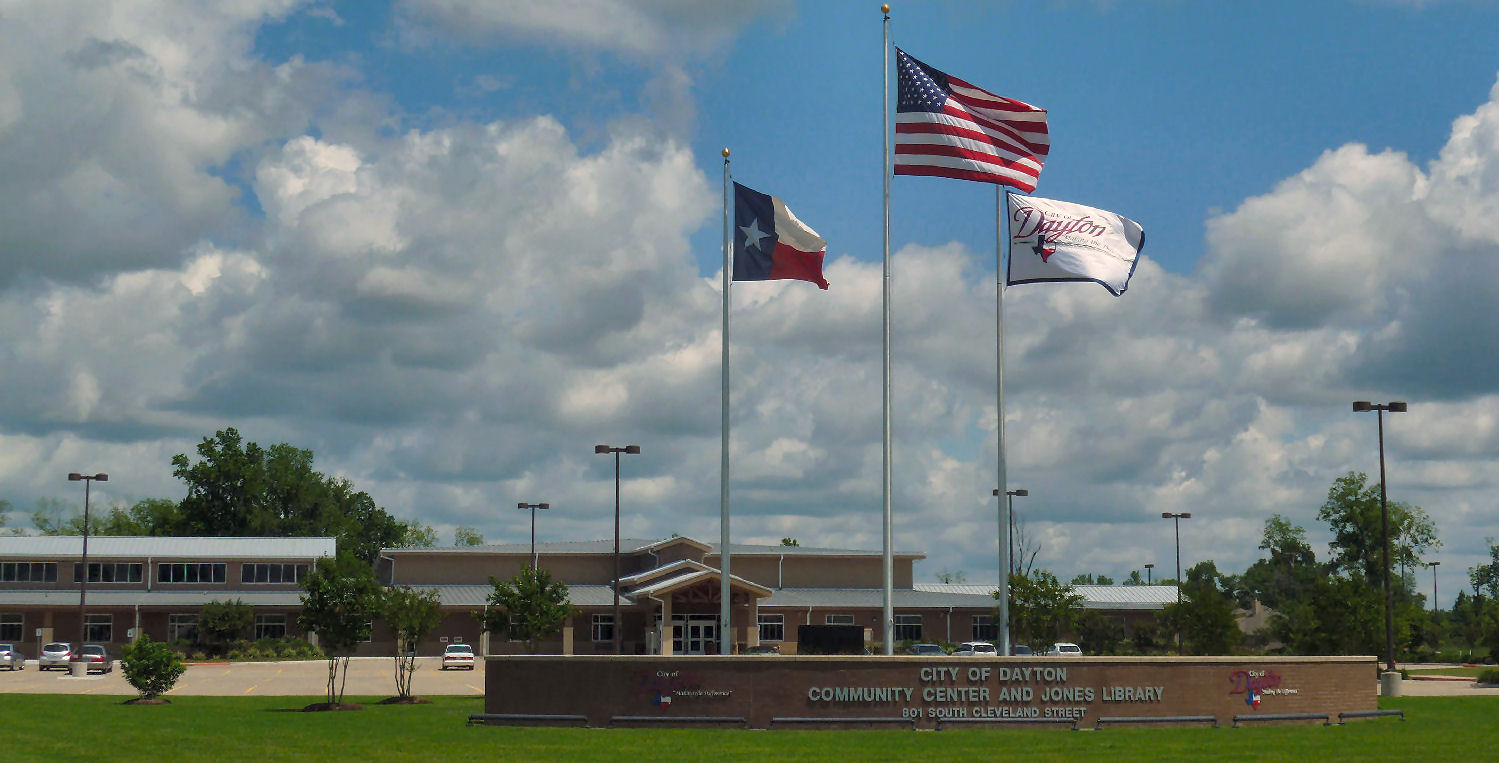
- Jones Library, Dayton Community Center and Senior Citizens Complex in Dayton

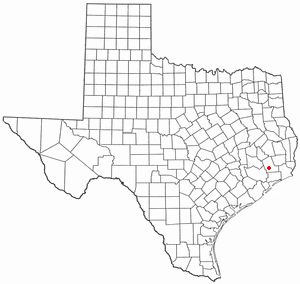
- Location in the state of Texas

- Coordinates: 30°03′23″N 94°53′44″W
- Country: United States
- State: Texas
- County: Liberty
- Founded: 1831 as West Liberty
- Incorporated: May 3, 1911 - Aug 29, 1911; Nov 28, 1925

Government
  - Type: Council–manager

Area
  - Total: 30.70 sq mi (79.51 km^{2})
  - Land: 30.66 sq mi (79.41 km^{2})
  - Water: 0.039 sq mi (0.10 km^{2})
- Elevation: 66 ft (20 m)

Population (2020)
  - Total: 8,777
  - Density: 273.6/sq mi (105.64/km^{2})
- Time zone: UTC-6 (CST)
  - Summer (DST): UTC-5 (CDT)
- ZIP code: 77535
- Area code: 936
- FIPS code: 48-19432
- GNIS feature ID: 2410300
- Website: www.cityofdaytontx.com

Dayton is a city in Liberty County, Texas, United States. The population was 8,777 at the 2020 census.

== Geography ==
According to the United States Census Bureau, the city has a total area of 30.70 square miles (79.5 km^{2}), of which all but 0.04 square miles (0.10 km^{2}) is land.

=== Climate ===
The climate in this area is characterized by hot, humid summers and generally mild to cool winters. According to the Köppen Climate Classification system, Dayton has a humid subtropical climate, abbreviated "Cfa" on climate maps.

== Demographics ==
Historical population
Census	Pop.	Note	%±
1870	230		—
1890	239		—
1930	1,207		—
1940	1,279		6.0%
1950	1,820		42.3%
1960	3,367		85.0%
1970	3,804		13.0%
1980	4,908		29.0%
1990	5,151		5.0%
2000	5,709		10.8%
2010	7,242		26.9%
2020	8,777		21.2%
U.S. Decennial Census; 1850–1900 1910; 1920 1930 1940; 1950 1960 1970; 1980 1990 2000; 2010; *1870 as West Liberty

=== 2020 census ===
As of the 2020 census, Dayton had a population of 8,777, with 3,113 households and 2,115 families residing in the city. The median age was 35.3 years, with 25.5% of residents under the age of 18 and 13.0% of residents aged 65 years or older. For every 100 females there were 84.9 males, and for every 100 females age 18 and over there were 77.9 males age 18 and over.

78.4% of residents lived in urban areas, while 21.6% lived in rural areas.

There were 3,113 households in Dayton, of which 37.7% had children under the age of 18 living in them. Of all households, 45.2% were married-couple households, 17.7% were households with a male householder and no spouse or partner present, and 30.4% were households with a female householder and no spouse or partner present. About 26.0% of all households were made up of individuals and 10.9% had someone living alone who was 65 years of age or older.

There were 3,434 housing units, of which 9.3% were vacant. The homeowner vacancy rate was 1.8% and the rental vacancy rate was 9.0%.

Racial composition as of the 2020 census (NH = Non-Hispanic) (Note: Note: the US Census treats Hispanic/Latino as an ethnic category. This table excludes Latinos from the racial categories and assigns them to a separate category. Hispanics/Latinos can be of any race.)
Race	Number	Percent
White	5,511	62.8%
Black or African American	1,328	15.1%
American Indian and Alaska Native	58	0.7%
Asian	135	1.5%
Native Hawaiian and Other Pacific Islander	3	0.0%
Some other race	812	9.3%
Two or more races	930	10.6%
Hispanic or Latino (of any race)	1,852	21.1%

=== 2000 census ===
As of the census of 2000, there were 5,709 people, 2,129 households, and 1,517 families residing in the city. The population density was 517.1 inhabitants per square mile (199.7/km^{2}). There were 2,371 housing units at an average density of 214.8 per square mile (82.9/km^{2}). The racial makeup of the city was 71.08% White, 19.69% African American, 0.44% Native American, 0.68% Asian, 0.04% Pacific Islander, 6.67% from other races, and 1.40% from two or more races. Hispanic or Latino of any race were 10.53% of the population.

There were 2,129 households, out of which 37.4% had children under the age of 18 living with them, 50.5% were married couples living together, 16.4% had a female householder with no husband present, and 28.7% were non-families. 25.2% of all households were made up of individuals, and 12.1% had someone living alone who was 65 years of age or older. The average household size was 2.66 and the average family size was 3.18.

In the city, the population was spread out, with 30.0% under the age of 18, 9.7% from 18 to 24, 28.2% from 25 to 44, 20.2% from 45 to 64, and 12.0% who were 65 years of age or older. The median age was 33 years. For every 100 females, there were 89.3 males. For every 100 females age 18 and over, there were 87.4 males.

The median income for a household in the city was $52,179, and the median income for a family was $47,250. Males had a median income of $39,075 versus $21,068 for females. The per capita income for the city was $29,123. About 16.3% of families and 21.3% of the population were below the poverty line, including 33.6% of those under age 18 and 15.8% of those age 65 or over.

== History ==
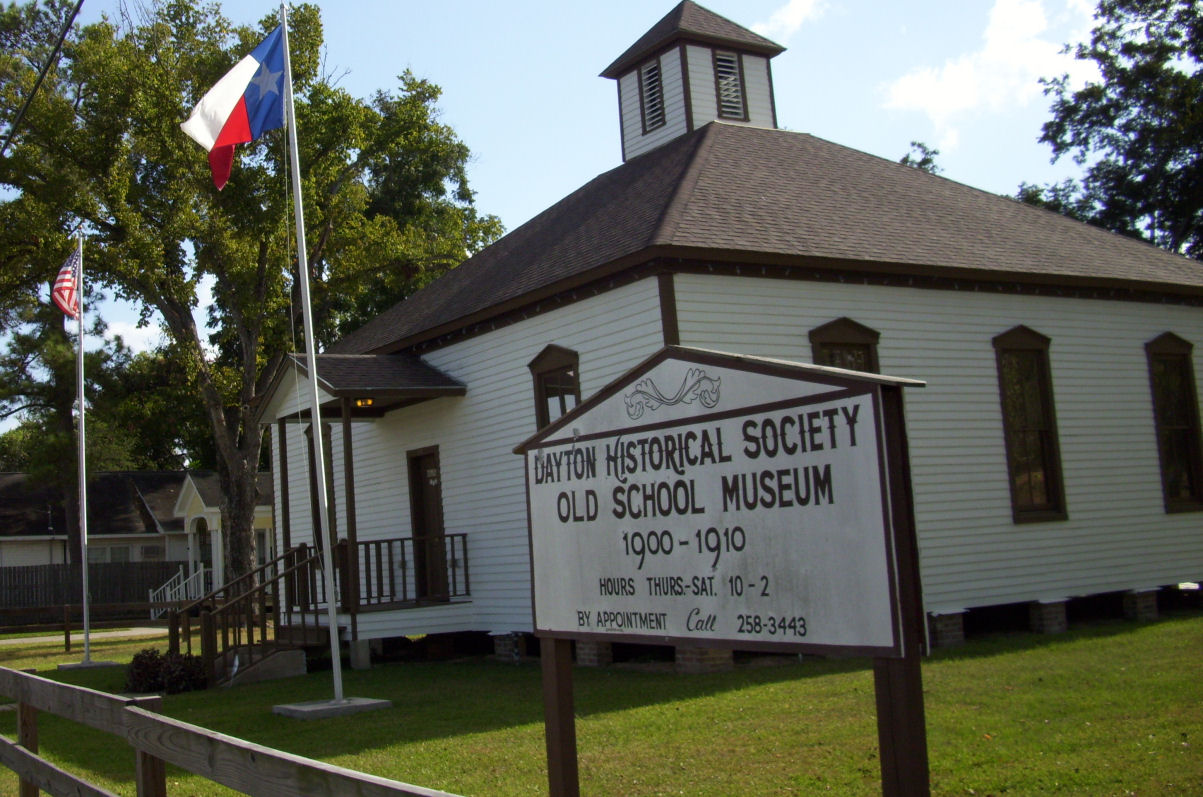
Old school museum

Dayton was historically also called West Liberty, Day's Town, Days Station, and Dayton Station. It was founded in 1831 as West Liberty, situated three miles west of the Trinity River, with Liberty on the east bank. It had a West Liberty post office from 1839–1841 and a Dayton post office, starting in 1877. Dayton was originally a part of the City of Liberty, but voters petitioned and voted to separate from the City of Liberty in 1898. Dayton incorporated in May 1911. A fire that devoured the center of town in late August 1911 was followed a few days later by a vote to disincorporate. Dayton voted to reincorporated on November 28, 1925.

== Government and infrastructure ==
The Texas Department of Criminal Justice (TDCJ) operates the Dayton District Parole Office in Dayton. In addition, the TDCJ operates some correctional facilities near the City limits of Dayton. The L.V. Hightower Unit prison and the Dempsie Henley Unit and Lucille G. Plane Unit prisons are 4 miles (6.4 km) north of the downtown area of Dayton.

The United States Postal Service operates the Dayton Post Office.

The District 18 seat in the Texas House of Representatives is currently held by republican Ernest Bailes.

The city of Dayton operates under a typical council–manager government with five elected members, and a mayor elected at-large. All six are non-partisan and unpaid, elected for two and three year terms, staggered so three positions are up for election each year. The current mayor is Martin Mudd elected in 2023. His current term will expire in 2026. Executive power is vested in the council-appointed city manager, currently City Manager Kimberly Judge. City Administration also includes a Deputy City Manager Derek Woods.

The Dayton Economic Development Corporation (DEDC), a type B Economic Development entity, provides economic development and community development services to the greater Dayton, Texas region. DEDC has invested over $3 Million in the local business community since its creation in 1996.

== Transportation ==
=== Highways ===
The major route passing through Dayton is U.S. Highway 90, traveling west towards Crosby and Houston and east into East Texas to Beaumont and onward to Louisiana.

SH 321 connects Dayton to Cleveland. Within the city of Dayton, SH 321 is referred to as North Cleveland Street, passing through residential Dayton as a four-lane urban highway, before narrowing back down to a two-lane rural State Highway going north to Cleveland.

SH 146 provides Dayton with a connection to Baytown.

FM 1960 connects Dayton to the northern reaches of Houston as well as Humble and Huffman. FM 1409 connects Dayton to Old River-Winfree.

Grand Parkway (SH 99) is a loop toll road that intersects with US 90 and connects Dayton with other outer areas of Greater Houston.

=== Railroads ===
Dayton is the meeting point of two rail lines. One is a north/south Union Pacific (UP) line that comes out of the UP Baytown Subdivision. The other is the east/west UP Lafayette Subdivision line that roughly follows US 90. The BNSF has authority to operate its trains on the Baytown Subdivision from Dayton to just west of Baytown and has a rail yard just south of Dayton. Another rail line runs through the northern edge of the city, called the UP Beaumont Subdivision. A study was performed by the Texas Department of Transportation concerning a Dayton-to-Cleveland single mainline rail corridor consisting of approximately 40 miles of track connecting the UP Lufkin Subdivision and the BNSF Conroe Subdivision near Cleveland to the UPRR Baytown Subdivision south of Dayton.

== Education ==
The city of Dayton is served by the Dayton Independent School District. Dayton has a high school called Dayton High School (Texas)

Dayton ISD students are zoned to Lee College.

The community is served by the Jones Public Library. The Jones Library Board is an advisory board appointed by the Dayton City Council.

== Notable people ==
- Don Brown, football player
- Bill Daniel, governor of the United States Territory of Guam
- Marion Price Daniel, Sr., Texas governor
- Julie Kocurek, attorney and judge
- Mike Mabry, American football center
- John Otto, American politician
- Aaron Ripkowski, football player
