= Hardin Independent School District =

School district in Texas, United States

Address
- 12195 North Highway 146 Liberty, Texas, 77575; United States

District information
- Type: Public
- Grades: PK–12
- Schools: 3
- NCES District ID: 4822380

Students and staff
- Students: 1,239 (2023–2024)
- Teachers: 81.11 (on an FTE basis) (2023–2024)
- Staff: 87.97 (on an FTE basis) (2023–2024)
- Student–teacher ratio: 15.28 (2023–2024)

Other information
- Website: www.hardinisd.net

Hardin Independent School District is a public school district based in Hardin, Texas, United States. In addition to Hardin, the district also serves the unincorporated areas of Moss Hill, Romayor, and Rye.

In 2010, the school district was rated "recognized" by the Texas Education Agency.

== History ==
In summer 1939, five schools agreed to join into a single institution. A $150,000 bond to have the consolidated school built, on land donated by a couple, was approved by residents in a June 1939 election.

In fall 2022 the district changed to a schedule where most months have school only four days per week, but that during August, September, January, and May, school is held for five days per week.

== Schools ==
=== High school ===
3A

- Hardin High School (grades 9–12)

=== Intermediate schools ===
- Hardin Junior High (grades 6–8)
- Hardin Intermediate (grades 5–6)

=== Elementary schools ===
- Hardin Elementary (prekindergarten-grade 4)
