= Dayton Independent School District =

School district in Texas, United States

Address
- 100 Cherry Creek Road Dayton, Texas, 77535; United States

District information
- Type: Public
- Grades: PK–12
- Schools: 7
- NCES District ID: 4816410

Students and staff
- Students: 5,787 (2023–2024)
- Teachers: 360.62 (on an FTE basis) (2023–2024)
- Staff: 445.91 (on an FTE basis) (2023–2024)
- Student–teacher ratio: 16.05 (2023–2024)

Other information
- Website: www.daytonisd.net

Dayton Independent School District is a public school district based in Dayton, Texas (USA).

The district largely serves the cities of Dayton, Dayton Lakes, Kenefick and surrounding unincorporated areas of Liberty County. Small portions of the district lie within Mont Belvieu and Old River-Winfree, as well as neighboring Harris County. The district stretches over 263 square miles (680 km^{2}).

== History ==
State records indicate the ISD existed as far back as 1883.

Each of the current K-5 schools serviced different grade levels, but after voters approved an over-$88 million bond in 2014, Dayton ISD began construction of new campuses, repurposing of the former SFA campus and demolishing the old Richter Elementary. The bond plan also included the movement of middle school students from Nottingham to Woodrow Wilson Junior High, improvements to and repurposement of Nottingham to a DAEP (alternative) center and night school, and an expansion of WWJH. Dayton High School was expanded and its auditorium was built, amongst other improvements and maintenance.

Former Dayton ISD trustee John Otto held the District 18 seat in the Texas House of Representatives from 2005 to 2016, which encompasses Liberty, San Jacinto, and Walker counties.

== Schools ==
=== Secondary schools ===
==== High schools ====
- Dayton High School (Grades 9–12)

==== Middle schools ====
- Woodrow Wilson Junior High (Grades 6–8)

=== Elementary schools ===
==== Grades K-5 ====
- Kimmie M. Brown Elementary
- Dr. E.R. Richter Elementary
- Stephen F. Austin Elementary

==== Pre-Kindergarten ====
- Colbert Elementary

=== Alternative education ===
- Nottingham Alternative Education Center
