= Moss Hill, Texas =

Human settlement in Texas, United States

Coordinates: 30°14′51″N 94°44′30″W

Moss Hill is an unincorporated community in Liberty County, Texas, United States.

== Education ==
Moss Hill is zoned to schools in the Hardin Independent School District.
