= Romayor, Texas =

Human settlement in Texas, United States

Coordinates: 30°27′05″N 94°50′36″W

Romayor is an unincorporated community in Liberty County, Texas, United States. According to the Handbook of Texas, the community had an estimated population of 96 in 2000.

Romayor is located at the junction of Farm to Market roads 787 and 2610, sixty-three miles northwest of Beaumont in northern Liberty County.

== Education ==
Romayor is zoned to schools in the Hardin Independent School District.

== Climate ==
The climate in this area is characterized by hot, humid summers and generally mild to cool winters. According to the Köppen Climate Classification system, Romayor has a humid subtropical climate, abbreviated "Cfa" on climate maps.
