= Hardin, Texas =

- City
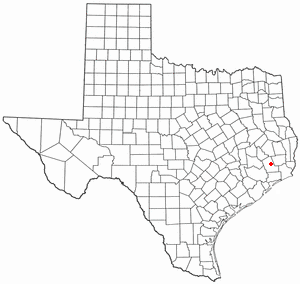
- Location of Hardin, Texas

- Coordinates: 30°08′25″N 94°44′14″W
- Country: United States
- State: Texas
- County: Liberty

Area
  - Total: 2.59 sq mi (6.71 km^{2})
  - Land: 2.59 sq mi (6.71 km^{2})
  - Water: 0 sq mi (0.00 km^{2})
- Elevation: 79 ft (24 m)

Population (2020)
  - Total: 768
  - Density: 360.7/sq mi (139.27/km^{2})
- Time zone: UTC-6 (Central (CST))
  - Summer (DST): UTC-5 (CDT)
- ZIP code: 77561
- Area code: 936
- FIPS code: 48-32240
- GNIS feature ID: 2410699
- Website: www.hardintexas.com

Hardin is a city in Liberty County, Texas, United States. Its population was 768 at the 2020 census.

== Geography ==
According to the United States Census Bureau, the city has a total area of 2.3 sq mi (6.0 km^{2}), all land.

== Demographics ==
Historical population
Census	Pop.	Note	%±
1980	779		—
1990	563		−27.7%
2000	755		34.1%
2010	819		8.5%
2020	768		−6.2%
U.S. Decennial Census; 1850–1900 1910; 1920 1930 1940; 1950 1960 1970; 1980 1990 2000; 2010

=== 2020 census ===
As of the 2020 census, Hardin had a population of 768, 295 households, and 183 families residing in the city.

The median age was 37.1 years. 24.7% of residents were under the age of 18 and 17.6% of residents were 65 years of age or older. For every 100 females there were 92.5 males, and for every 100 females age 18 and over there were 98.6 males age 18 and over.

0.0% of residents lived in urban areas, while 100.0% lived in rural areas.

There were 295 households in Hardin, of which 36.3% had children under the age of 18 living in them. Of all households, 50.8% were married-couple households, 19.3% were households with a male householder and no spouse or partner present, and 25.4% were households with a female householder and no spouse or partner present. About 18.0% of all households were made up of individuals and 11.2% had someone living alone who was 65 years of age or older.

There were 332 housing units, of which 11.1% were vacant. The homeowner vacancy rate was 0.0% and the rental vacancy rate was 19.3%.

Racial composition as of the 2020 census
Race	Number	Percent
White	656	85.4%
Black or African American	14	1.8%
American Indian and Alaska Native	5	0.7%
Asian	2	0.3%
Native Hawaiian and Other Pacific Islander	0	0.0%
Some other race	52	6.8%
Two or more races	39	5.1%
Hispanic or Latino (of any race)	88	11.5%

=== 2000 census ===
As of the 2000 census, 819 people, 291 households, and 219 families were residing in the city. The population density was 329.4 people per square mile (127.3/km^{2}). The 305 housing units had an average density of 133.1/sq mi (51.4/km^{2}). The racial makeup of the city was 98.54% White, 0.53% African American, 0.13% Asian, 0.66% from other races, and 0.13% from two or more races. Hispanics or Latinos of any race were 4.11% of the population.

Of the 291 households, 34.4% had children under 18 living with them, 62.9% were married couples living together, 8.9% had a female householder with no husband present, and 24.7% were not families. About 22.7% of all households were made up of individuals, and 12.4% had someone living alone who was 65 or older. The average household size was 2.59, and the average family size was 3.03.

In the city, the age distribution was 26.0% under 18, 9.1% from 18 to 24, 26.0% from 25 to 44, 24.6% from 45 to 64, and 14.3% who were 65 or older. The median age was 38 years. For every 100 females, there were 99.2 males. For every 100 females age 18 and over, there were 95.5 males.

The median income for a household in the city was $41,016, and for a family was $47,500. Males had a median income of $36,964 versus $19,583 for females. The per capita income for the city was $18,445. About 6.9% of families and 8.7% of the population were below the poverty line, including 10.2% of those under age 18 and 11.0% of those age 65 or over.

== Education ==
The city is served by the Hardin Independent School District. Residents of Hardin ISD are zoned to Lee College.
