= Rye, Texas =

Human settlement in Texas, United States

Rye is an unincorporated community in Liberty County, Texas, United States.

== Education ==
Rye is zoned to schools in the Hardin Independent School District.
