= Cleveland, Texas =

- City
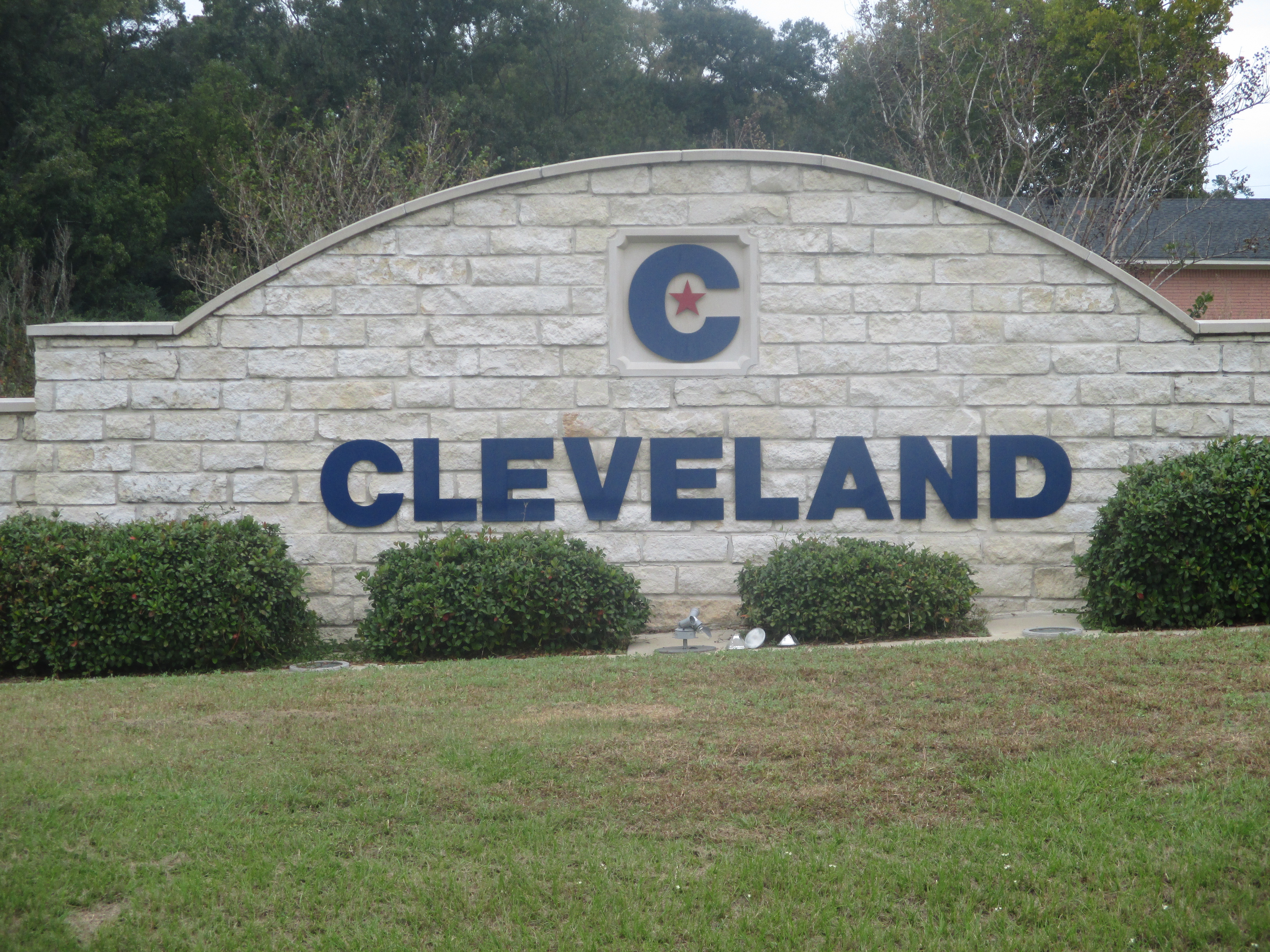
- Welcome Sign in Cleveland

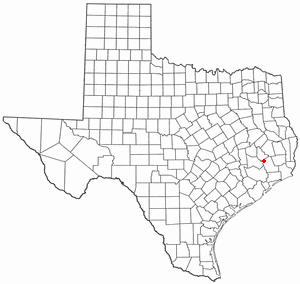
- Location in the State of Texas

- Cleveland located within Liberty County
- Coordinates: 30°20′42″N 95°05′01″W
- Country: United States
- State: Texas
- County: Liberty
- Incorporated: 1935

Area
  - Total: 18.99 sq mi (49.19 km^{2})
  - Land: 18.98 sq mi (49.16 km^{2})
  - Water: 0.012 sq mi (0.03 km^{2})
- Elevation: 151 ft (46 m)

Population (2020)
  - Total: 7,471
  - Estimate (2025): 9,936
  - Density: 434.0/sq mi (167.57/km^{2})
- Time zone: UTC-6 (CST)
  - Summer (DST): UTC-5 (CDT)
- ZIP codes: 77327-77328
- Area codes: 281/346/621/713/832
- FIPS code: 48-15436
- GNIS feature ID: 2409482
- Website: www.clevelandtexas.com

Cleveland is a city in the U.S. state of Texas, within the Greater Houston metropolitan area and Liberty County. Its population was 7,471 at the 2020 census.

== History ==
In 1854, a church and convent were built by Father Peter La Cour near the town's present site. The town began forming in 1878 when Charles Lander Cleveland, a local judge, donated 63.6 acres (257,000 m^{2}) of land to the Houston East and West Texas Railway (now part of the Union Pacific Railroad) for use as a stop, requesting that the town be named for him. Since 1900, Cleveland has served as the junction of this line and the Gulf, Colorado and Santa Fe (now the BNSF Railway). The town was not incorporated until 1935.

The forests around Cleveland, including Sam Houston National Forest, which is located just to its north, are a resort for many inhabitants of the Houston area, who come to camp, hike, hunt, and fish. Cleveland has several historic sites and public recreational facilities, including two parks. The Austin Memorial Library Center offers a wide range of services to the community, and the Texan Theater and the annual livestock show and rodeo, Dairy Days, provide entertainment. Commercially, Cleveland has been a shipping point for timber, lumber, and lumber byproducts since the 1870s. A large medical community, oil, gas, cattle, farm products, and sand and gravel are important to the town's economy. The general trend toward urbanization of the entire area is reflected by the fact that in 1965 Liberty County was added to the Houston metropolitan statistical area. The population of Cleveland grew from 1,200 in 1930 to 7,605 according to the census of 2000.

In 2010, 19 young men and teens from Cleveland were arrested for gang rapes of an 11-year-old Mexican girl. Ultimately, 21 persons either pled guilty to or were found guilty of crimes connected to the rapes and received punishments ranging from life in prison to probation.

On April 28, 2023, five people, including an eight-year-old, were killed in a mass shooting outside the town.

== Geography and climate ==
According to the United States Census Bureau, the city has a total area of 4.8 square miles (12 km^{2}), all land. Cleveland's northern boundary is made by the Sam Houston National Forest. The climate is characterized by hot, humid summers and generally mild to cool winters. According to the Köppen climate classification, Cleveland has a humid subtropical climate, Cfa on climate maps.

=== Climate ===
Climate data for Cleveland, Texas (1991–2020 normals, extremes 1962–2018)
| Month | Jan | Feb | Mar | Apr | May | Jun | Jul | Aug | Sep | Oct | Nov | Dec | Year |
|---|---|---|---|---|---|---|---|---|---|---|---|---|---|
| Record high °F (°C) | 83 (28) | 90 (32) | 91 (33) | 98 (37) | 98 (37) | 102 (39) | 105 (41) | 112 (44) | 110 (43) | 98 (37) | 87 (31) | 84 (29) | 112 (44) |
| Mean maximum °F (°C) | 77.2 (25.1) | 80.4 (26.9) | 84.8 (29.3) | 87.8 (31.0) | 91.6 (33.1) | 94.7 (34.8) | 97.1 (36.2) | 98.9 (37.2) | 95.8 (35.4) | 90.2 (32.3) | 83.2 (28.4) | 78.0 (25.6) | 99.5 (37.5) |
| Mean daily maximum °F (°C) | 60.8 (16.0) | 65.0 (18.3) | 71.6 (22.0) | 77.1 (25.1) | 83.4 (28.6) | 88.9 (31.6) | 91.4 (33.0) | 92.4 (33.6) | 87.5 (30.8) | 79.2 (26.2) | 68.7 (20.4) | 61.7 (16.5) | 77.3 (25.2) |
| Daily mean °F (°C) | 49.8 (9.9) | 53.7 (12.1) | 60.3 (15.7) | 66.0 (18.9) | 73.4 (23.0) | 79.4 (26.3) | 81.6 (27.6) | 81.9 (27.7) | 76.9 (24.9) | 67.7 (19.8) | 57.6 (14.2) | 50.9 (10.5) | 66.6 (19.2) |
| Mean daily minimum °F (°C) | 38.9 (3.8) | 42.5 (5.8) | 49.0 (9.4) | 54.9 (12.7) | 63.4 (17.4) | 69.8 (21.0) | 71.7 (22.1) | 71.3 (21.8) | 66.4 (19.1) | 56.3 (13.5) | 46.6 (8.1) | 40.2 (4.6) | 55.9 (13.3) |
| Mean minimum °F (°C) | 23.6 (−4.7) | 26.7 (−2.9) | 31.6 (−0.2) | 39.4 (4.1) | 50.4 (10.2) | 62.1 (16.7) | 66.4 (19.1) | 65.7 (18.7) | 52.3 (11.3) | 40.3 (4.6) | 31.5 (−0.3) | 24.8 (−4.0) | 20.4 (−6.4) |
| Record low °F (°C) | 11 (−12) | 16 (−9) | 20 (−7) | 29 (−2) | 36 (2) | 50 (10) | 55 (13) | 54 (12) | 39 (4) | 25 (−4) | 19 (−7) | 5 (−15) | 5 (−15) |
| Average precipitation inches (mm) | 4.45 (113) | 4.29 (109) | 3.76 (96) | 3.73 (95) | 5.25 (133) | 5.19 (132) | 3.46 (88) | 4.56 (116) | 5.10 (130) | 5.75 (146) | 5.39 (137) | 4.60 (117) | 55.53 (1,410) |
| Average snowfall inches (cm) | 0.1 (0.25) | 0.0 (0.0) | 0.0 (0.0) | 0.0 (0.0) | 0.0 (0.0) | 0.0 (0.0) | 0.0 (0.0) | 0.0 (0.0) | 0.0 (0.0) | 0.0 (0.0) | 0.0 (0.0) | 0.0 (0.0) | 0.1 (0.25) |
| Average precipitation days (≥ 0.01 in) | 10.1 | 9.4 | 8.8 | 7.3 | 8.1 | 9.8 | 8.1 | 8.1 | 7.5 | 6.7 | 8.3 | 10.7 | 102.9 |
| Average snowy days (≥ 0.1 in) | 0.1 | 0.0 | 0.0 | 0.0 | 0.0 | 0.0 | 0.0 | 0.0 | 0.0 | 0.0 | 0.0 | 0.1 | 0.2 |
Source: NOAA(mean maxima/minima 1981–2010)

== Demographics ==
Historical population
| Census | Pop. | Note | %± |
|---|---|---|---|
| 1930 | 1,422 | | — |
| 1940 | 1,783 | | 25.4% |
| 1950 | 5,183 | | 190.7% |
| 1960 | 5,838 | | 12.6% |
| 1970 | 5,627 | | −3.6% |
| 1980 | 5,977 | | 6.2% |
| 1990 | 7,124 | | 19.2% |
| 2000 | 7,605 | | 6.8% |
| 2010 | 7,675 | | 0.9% |
| 2020 | 7,471 | | −2.7% |
| 2025 (est.) | 9,936 | | 33.0% |
U.S. Decennial Census; 1850–1900 1910; 1920 1930 1940; 1950 1960 1970; 1980 1990 2000; 2010

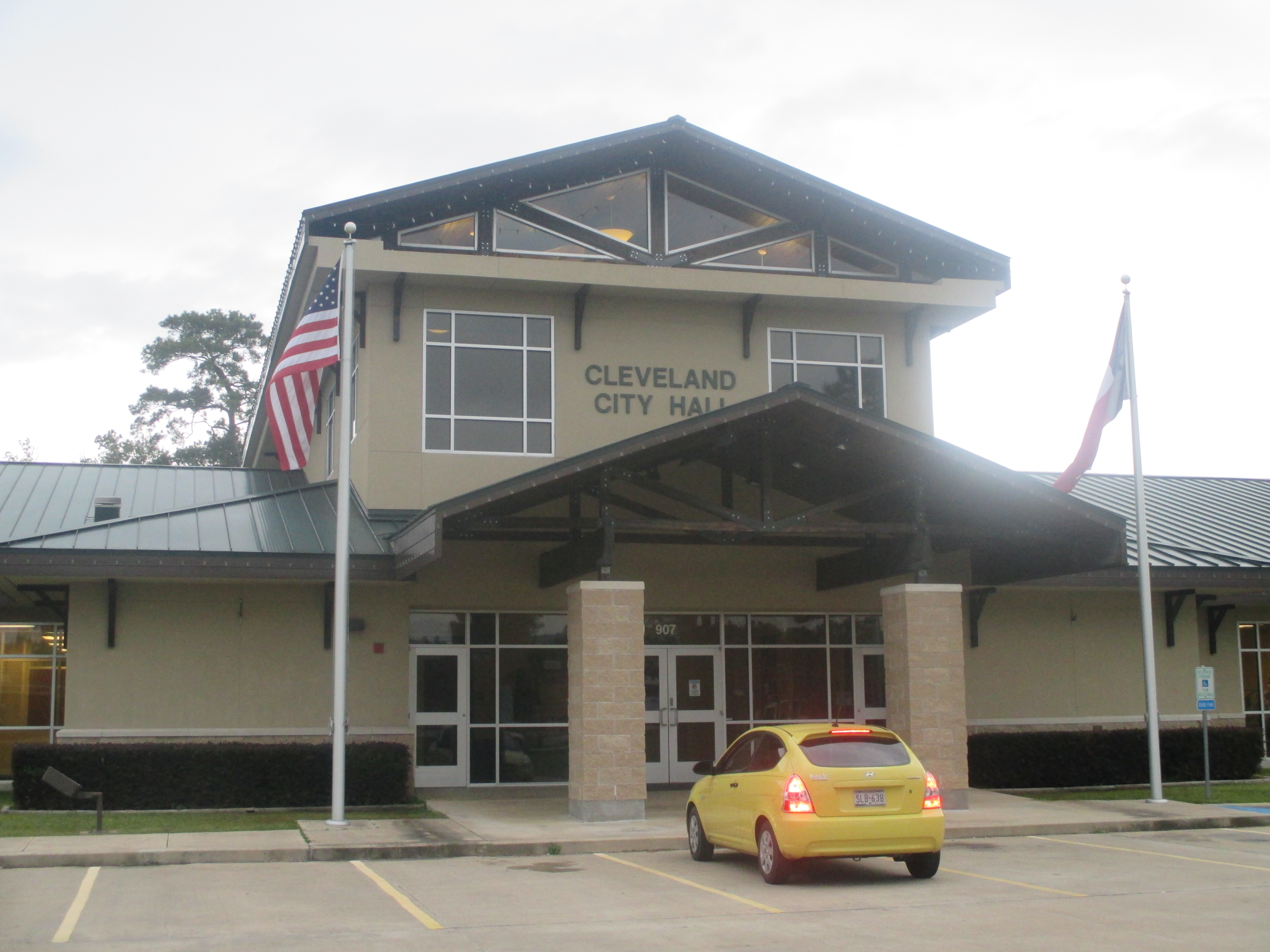
Cleveland City Hall

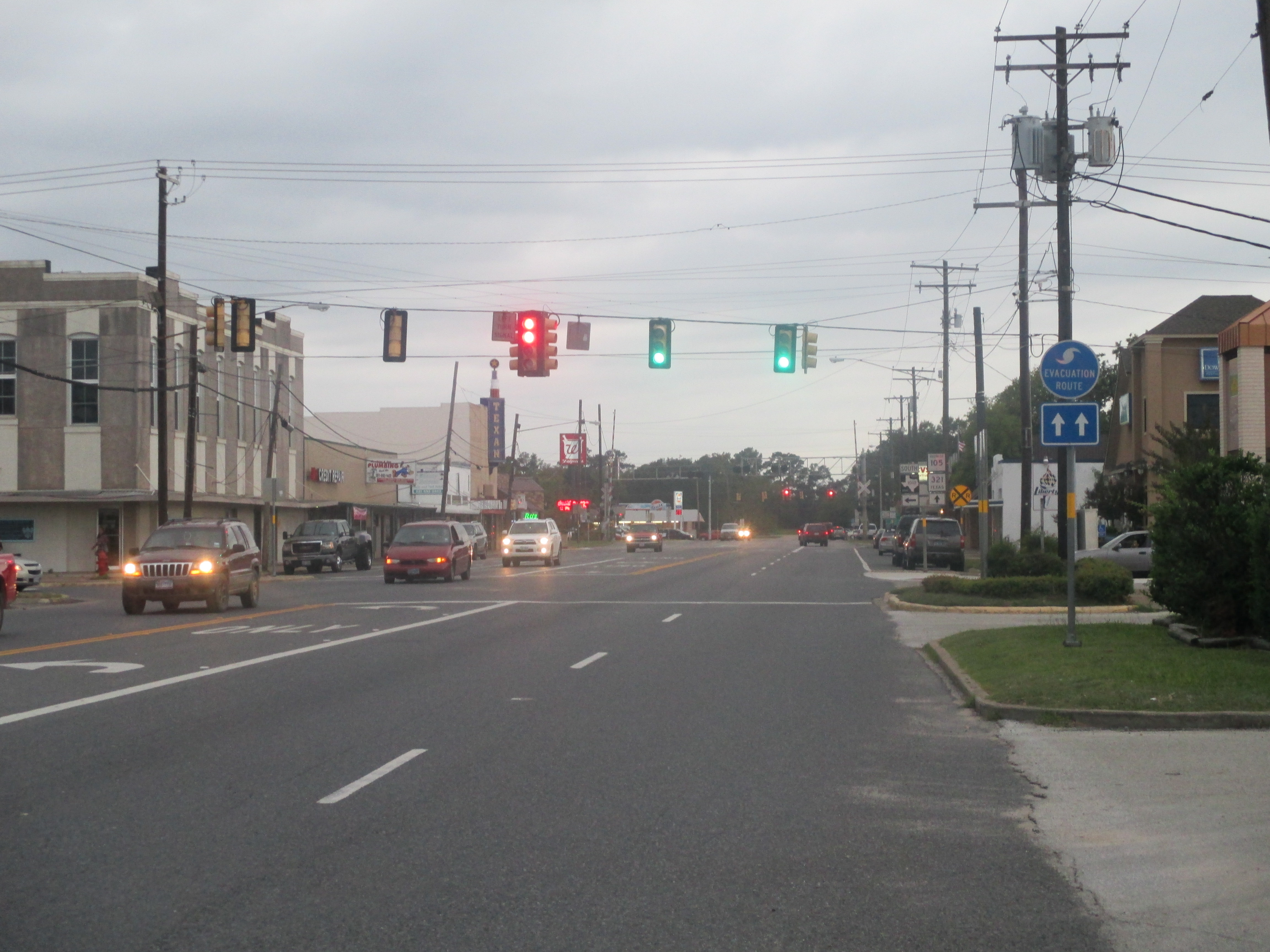
A portion of downtown Cleveland

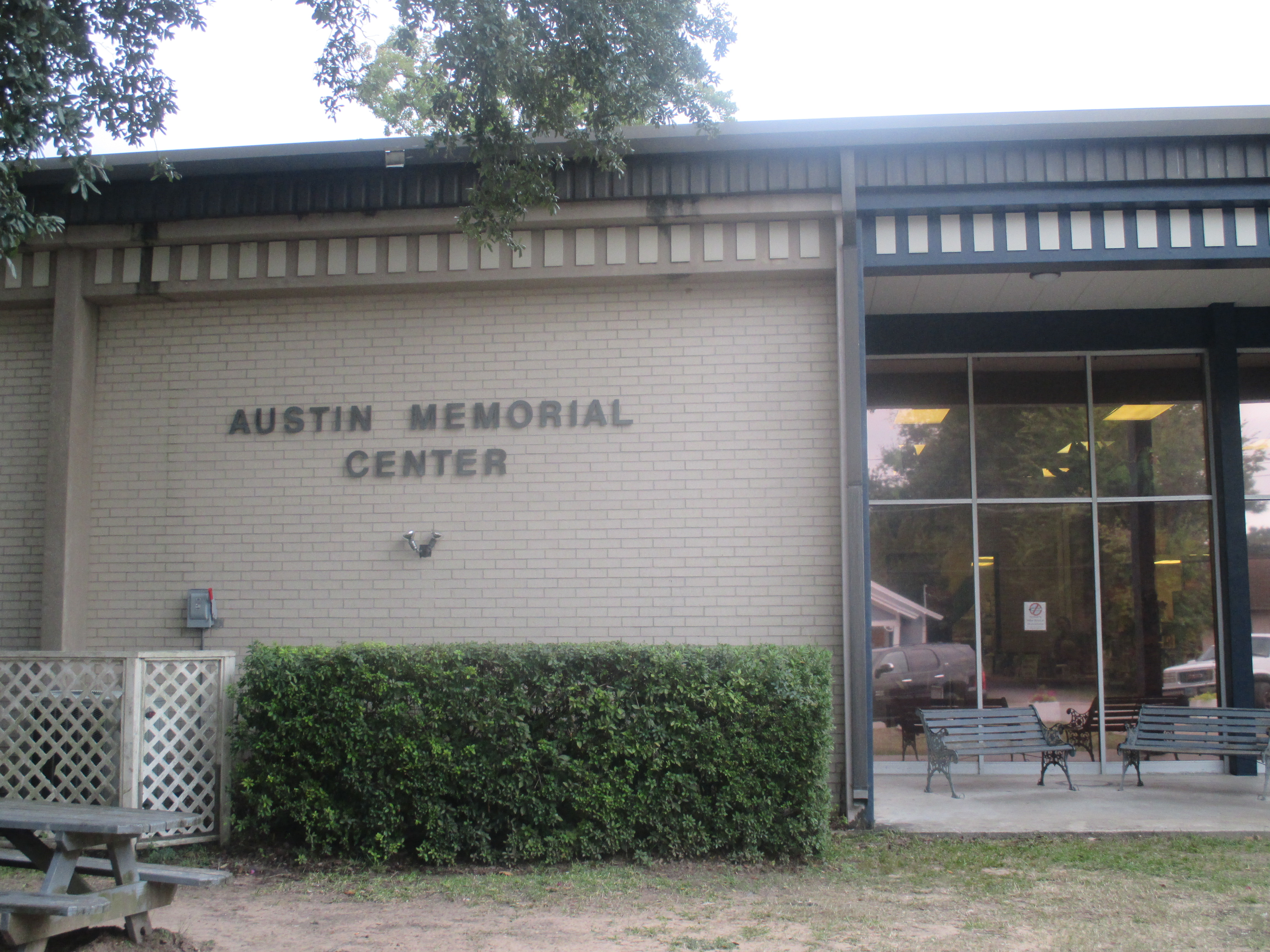
Austin Memorial Center is the public library in Cleveland.

=== Racial and ethnic composition ===
Cleveland city, Texas – Racial and ethnic composition Note: the US Census treats Hispanic/Latino as an ethnic category. This table excludes Latinos from the racial categories and assigns them to a separate category. Hispanics/Latinos may be of any race.
| Race / Ethnicity (NH = Non-Hispanic) | Pop 2000 | Pop 2010 | Pop 2020 | % 2000 | % 2010 | % 2020 |
|---|---|---|---|---|---|---|
| White alone (NH) | 3,842 | 3,510 | 3,109 | 50.52% | 45.73% | 41.61% |
| Black or African American alone (NH) | 2,055 | 1,819 | 1,599 | 27.02% | 23.70% | 21.40% |
| Native American or Alaska Native alone (NH) | 22 | 12 | 24 | 0.29% | 0.16% | 0.32% |
| Asian alone (NH) | 44 | 99 | 76 | 0.58% | 1.29% | 1.02% |
| Pacific Islander alone (NH) | 0 | 1 | 2 | 0.00% | 0.01% | 0.03% |
| Other race alone (NH) | 15 | 7 | 15 | 0.20% | 0.09% | 0.20% |
| Multiracial (NH) | 67 | 96 | 237 | 0.88% | 1.25% | 3.17% |
| Hispanic or Latino (any race) | 1,560 | 2,131 | 2,409 | 20.51% | 27.77% | 32.24% |
| Total | 7,605 | 7,675 | 7,471 | 100.00% | 100.00% | 100.00% |

=== 2020 census ===
As of the 2020 census, Cleveland had a population of 7,471; the median age was 36.0 years, 23.9% of the residents were under 18 and 14.6% were 65 years of age or older. The female/male ratio was 1:1.066 overall and 1:1.053 for 18 and over.

Most of the residents lived in urban areas, while 4.9% lived in rural areas.

Of the 2,633 households in Cleveland, 35.4% had children under 18 living in them, 37.0% were married-couple households, 19.1% were households with a male householder and no spouse or partner present, and 37.7% were households with a female householder and no spouse or partner present. About 30.1% of all households were made up of individuals, and 13.1% had someone living alone who was 65 or older.

The city had 3,075 housing units, of which 14.4% were vacant. Among occupied housing units, 50.2% were owner-occupied and 49.8% were renter-occupied. The homeowner vacancy rate was 2.4% and the rental vacancy rate was 9.7%.

Racial composition as of the 2020 census
| Race | Number | Percentage |
|---|---|---|
| White | 3,523 | 47.2% |
| Black or African American | 1,627 | 21.8% |
| American Indian and Alaska Native | 95 | 1.3% |
| Asian | 85 | 1.1% |
| Native Hawaiian and other Pacific Islander | 3 | <0.1% |
| Some other race | 1,398 | 18.7% |
| Two or more races | 740 | 9.9% |
| Hispanic or Latino (of any race) | 2,409 | 32.2% |

=== 2010 census ===
As of the 2010 census, Cleveland had a population of 7,675. The racial and ethnic makeup of the population was 45.7% White, 23.7% Black, 1.3% Asian, 13.0% from other races, and 2.5% from two or more races; 27.8% was Hispanic or Latino of any race.

=== 2000 census ===
As of the census of 2000, 7,605 people, 2,645 households, and 1,758 families resided in the city. The population density was 1,580.5 inhabitants per square mile (610.2/km^{2}). The 2,976 housing units averaged 618.5 per square mile (238.9/km^{2}). The racial makeup of the city was 58.65% White, 27.13% African American, 0.33% Native American, 0.59% Asian, 11.58% from other races, and 1.72% from two or more races. Hispanics or Latino of any race were 20.51% of the population.

Of the 2,645 households, 34.0% had children under 18 living with them, 42.4% were married couples living together, 19.0% had a female householder with no husband present, and 33.5% were not families. About 29.2% of all households were made up of individuals, and 13.9% had someone living alone who was 65 or older. The average household size was 2.63, and the average family size was 3.27.

In the city, the age distribution was 27.4% under 18, 10.7% from 18 to 24, 29.6% from 25 to 44, 18.3% from 45 to 64, and 14.0% who were 65 or older. The median age was 33 years. For every 100 females, there were 101.0 males. For every 100 females 18 and over, there were 101.7 males.

The median income in the city for a household was $24,164 and for a family was $28,527. Males had a median income of $28,385 versus $17,889 for females. The per capita income for the city was $13,562. About 19.3% of families and 22.4% of the population were below the poverty line, including 31.8% of those under 18 and 16.1% of those 65 or over.

== Government ==
Cleveland operates under the council-manager form of government. Under this system, the mayor and five council members appoint the city manager, who acts as the chief executive officer of the government. The city manager carries out policy and administers city programs. All department heads, including the city attorney, police chief, and fire chief, are ultimately responsible to the city manager. All city council positions are officially nonpartisan. The city operates and maintains these divisions:

- Administration
- Police
- Fire/EMS
- Water and sewer utilities
- Streets
- Building inspection and code enforcement
- Library
- Parks
- Airport
- Cemetery

The Cleveland Unit, a prison for men operated by the Texas Department of Criminal Justice, is in the city, 0.25 mi (0.40 km) from downtown Cleveland.

== Education ==
The city served by several school districts. In Liberty County, most of the city is within the Cleveland Independent School District, while small portions are in the Tarkington Independent School District. Tarkington ISD, located east southeast of the city of Cleveland, also has a Cleveland zipcode.

Within Montgomery County, parts of Cleveland are in Cleveland ISD, while other parts are in the Splendora Independent School District.

As of 2023 Cleveland High School is the sole comprehensive high school of Cleveland ISD. Splendora High School is the sole comprehensive high school of Splendora ISD. Tarkington High School is the sole comprehensive high school of Tarkington ISD.

Residents of Cleveland ISD (and therefore Cleveland) are served by the Lone Star College System (formerly North Harris Montgomery Community College). Splendora ISD and Tarkington ISD residents are also in Lone Star.

== Transportation ==
=== Highways ===
The major route traveling through Cleveland is Interstate 69, along with U.S. Highway 59, traveling southwest towards Houston and northeast into East Texas. U.S. 59 goes through the cities of Livingston, Lufkin, and Nacogdoches, and onward to Texarkana, Texas. US 59 is designated as the TTC-I-69 Corridor. U.S. Highway 59 Business is the original route of U.S. 59, which runs north and south through the center of Cleveland, known locally as Washington Avenue and Loop 573. A current limited-access bypass for U.S. 59 was created due to traffic densities in downtown Cleveland that rivaled those of many large cities. SH 105 travels east and west, and Cleveland is roughly the halfway point between Beaumont and Navasota. SH 105 runs concurrently with SH 321 until SH 105 splits, going eastbound to Beaumont, while SH 321 continues roughly 20 miles (32 km) further south into Dayton. Construction was recently completed on a loop coming off SH 105 near Pin Oak Road, along the southern side of Cleveland, crossing Interstate 69/U.S. Highway 59 and FM 1010, and terminating at SH 321 near New Salem Road.

=== Railroads ===
Cleveland is the meeting point of two rail lines. One is a north–south Union Pacific line that closely follows the path of Interstate 69/U.S. Highway 59. The other is an east/west Burlington Northern Santa Fe line that roughly follows FM 787 to the east, and SH 105 west towards Conroe. Union Tank Car Company has a tank repair/maintenance facility along the BNSF line on the outskirts of Cleveland off FM 787.

=== Airports ===
Cleveland Municipal Airport, a general-aviation airport, is in Cleveland. George Bush Intercontinental Airport in Houston is the closest airport with commercial airline service.

== Notable people ==
- Jason Grimsley was born in Cleveland and went to school in Tarkington ISD, just east of town on State Hwy 321. Grimsley pitched for several Major League Baseball teams.
- Gib Lewis, a speaker of the Texas House of Representatives, spent his formative years in Cleveland. He graduated from Cleveland High School in 1955.
