= FBA =

FBA may refer to:

- Federal Bar Association
- Federation of British Artists
- Fellow of the British Academy
- Filsports Basketball Association
- First Baptist Academy (Houston, Texas), United States
- First Baptist Academy of Dallas, Texas, United States
- First Baptist Church (Atlanta), Georgia, United States
- Fixed-block architecture
- Florida Basketball Association
- Flux balance analysis, in chemical engineering/systems biology
- Folke Bernadotte Academy
- Fonte Boa Airport, in Brazil
- Belgian Forces in Germany (French: Forces belges en Allemagne) after the Second World War
- Found Brothers Aviation, Canadian aircraft manufacturer
- Foundational Black Americans, the original black population of the United States and their descendants
- Franco-British Aviation, an early-20th-century British seaplane manufacturer with a French subsidiary
- French BasketBall Association
- Freshwater Biological Association
- Fulfillment by Amazon; Amazon B2B service
- Functional behavioral assessment
- Fusiform body area
- A component of FVA - one of the X-Value Adjustments in relation to derivative instruments held by banks
- First Baptist Academy (FBA)
