= The Lake Houston Sentinel =

- Type: Weekly
- Format: Broadsheet
- Owner(s): ASP Westward LP
- Publisher: Gordon Gallitan
- Editor: David Taylor
- Managing editor: Bobby Vasquez
- Founded: 1973
- Headquarters: 102 South Shaver; Pasadena, TX 77506; USA
- Circulation: 22,000 weekly
- Website: thelakehoustonsentinel.com

The Lake Houston Sentinel is a weekly community newspaper serving the Crosby, Huffman, Highlands, Barrett and Baytown communities in east and northeast Harris County, Texas, United States. (The Lake Houston Sentinel has been replaced with *The Lake Houston Observer, yourhoustonnews.com/lake_houston)
