= List of school districts in Houston =

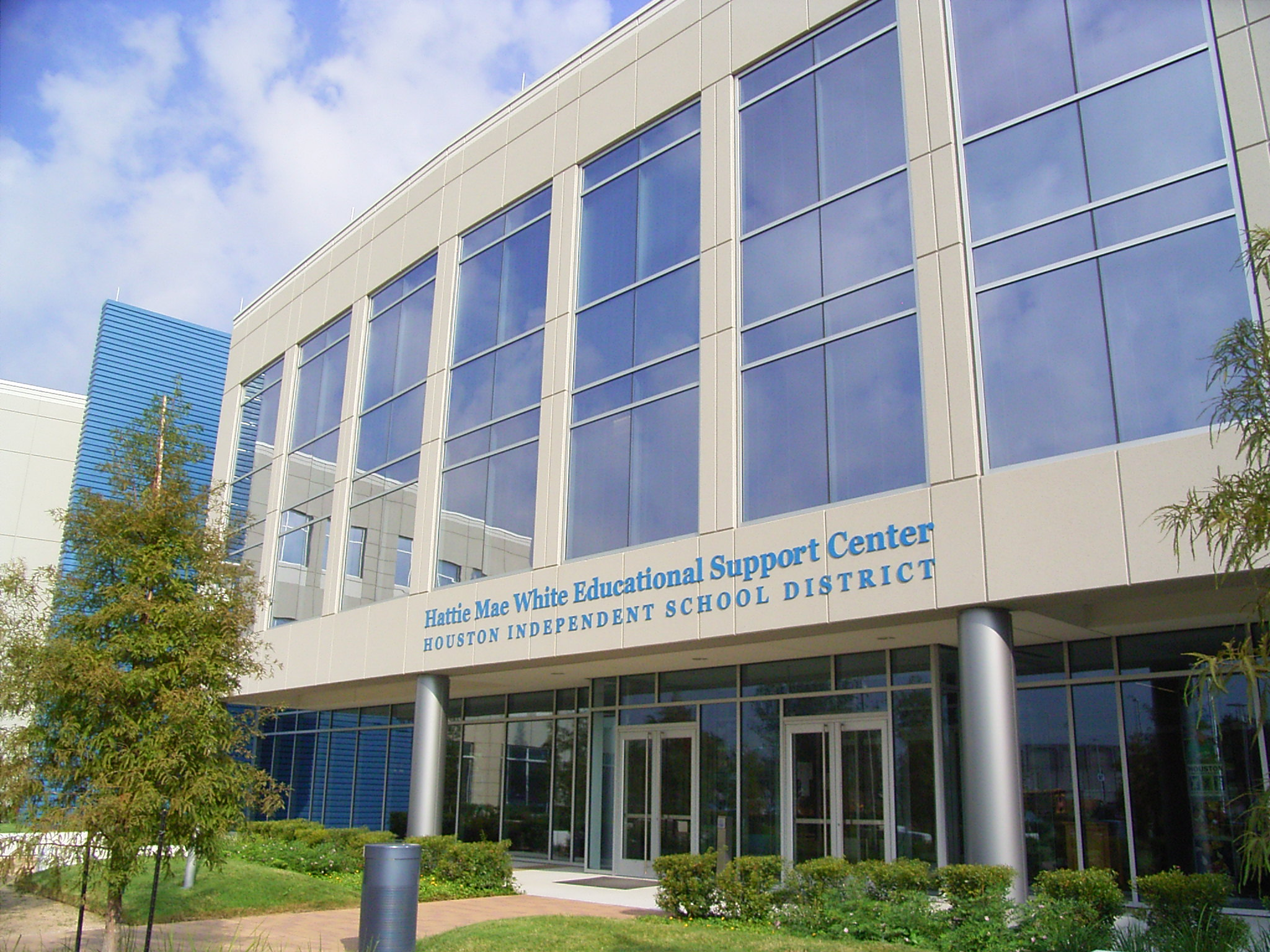
Hattie Mae White Educational Support Center is the headquarters of the Houston Independent School District.

The following is a complete list of school districts serving the city limits of Houston, Texas.

- Aldine Independent School District
- Alief Independent School District
- Clear Creek Independent School District
- Crosby Independent School District
- Cypress Fairbanks Independent School District
- Fort Bend Independent School District
- Galena Park Independent School District
- Houston Independent School District
- Huffman Independent School District
- Humble Independent School District
- Katy Independent School District
- Klein Independent School District
- Lamar Consolidated Independent School District
- New Caney Independent School District
- North Forest Independent School District (annexed by Houston Independent School District as of June 13, 2013)
- Pasadena Independent School District
- Sheldon Independent School District
- Spring Independent School District
- Spring Branch Independent School District
- Tomball Independent School District
