= Steven Hobbs (murderer) =

American murderer, rapist and suspected serial killer

- Born: Steven Alexander Hobbs; February 23, 1971 (age 55); Crosby, Texas, U.S.
- Convictions: Murder x2 Sexual assault x3
- Penalty: Life imprisonment x2

Details
- Victims: 2 (confirmed); 3–15+ (suspected)
- Span of crimes: 2002 – 2010 (confirmed); 1996 – 2011 (suspected)
- Country: United States
- State: Texas
- Date apprehended: October 20, 2011
- Imprisoned at: Ramsey Unit, Rosharon, Texas

Steven Alexander Hobbs (born February 23, 1971) is an American murderer, rapist and suspected serial killer who is known to have sexually assaulted multiple prostitutes around Harris County, Texas from 2002 to 2011, at least two of which were murdered. After a decade-long delay in his trial, he pleaded guilty to his confirmed crimes and was sentenced to life imprisonment, but remains the prime suspect in at least one additional murder.

== Early life ==
Little is known about Hobbs' past. Born in 1971 in Crosby, Texas, he is said to have come from a reputable family, but was considered a loner who mostly kept to himself. After graduating from college, he married, had two children and held a job as a security guard for a firm in Houston, where he still worked at the time of his arrest. He had no criminal record, but in 2000, he had been detained in the county jail for a couple of hours for a traffic violation.

== Crimes ==
Although investigators suspect Hobbs of crimes dating back to 1996, the first case he has definitively been linked to occurred in August 2002. At that time, he picked up a woman in Houston and paid her to perform oral sex, but instead proceeded to rape, beat and violently choke her. This assault took place off the Beaumont Highway, near the San Jacinto River, where the victim was left behind. A couple of months later, he abducted 38-year-old Patricia Ann Pyatt from her home in Crosby, drove to an isolated area, then raped and strangled her to death. Her remains were found on November 19, beneath the Beaumont Highway bridge.

A lull in known attacks then occurred from the rest of 2002 until 2010, when Hobbs is known to have assaulted a sex worker named Sandra Gunter near Houston. In October of that year, the nude body of 48-year-old Sarah Annette Sanford was found in a wooded area near his home. She had been handcuffed, sexually assaulted and shot in the head.

Between June and July 2011, Hobbs is known to have attacked and sexually assaulted at least three prostitutes at gunpoint in and around Houston. On September 22, an officer from Pasadena who stopped by a brushy road to clock the speed of passing cars accidentally found the decomposing remains of 57-year-old Wanda Trombley, a sex worker who had been reported missing in July.

== Arrest, imprisonment and guilty plea ==
The discovery of Trombley's body led local authorities to start questioning prostitutes, some of whom alleged that they had been assaulted by a large, red-headed white male wearing thick eyeglasses and a security guard uniform. Using this information, officers ordered all men who worked as security guards in the county to submit DNA samples, including Hobbs. This eventually linked him to the sexual assaults and then the murders of Pyatt and Sanford. The gap between the crimes led investigators to re-investigate the murders of at least 15 prostitutes around Harris County and the surrounding areas, as they believed that Hobbs was responsible for more crimes than what he had been linked to. Despite this and the fact that he was a prime suspect in the Trombley murder, no further charges were filed against him.

Almost ten years would elapse before Hobbs would be put on trial - this was due to multiple delays caused by the search for reliable witnesses, damage from Hurricane Katrina and debates on whether he should face the death penalty. In 2020, the Harris County District Attorney Kim Ogg announced that she would not be seeking the death penalty against Hobbs, but the reason for this decision has never been revealed.

In May 2022, just days before he was due to stand trial, Hobbs pleaded guilty to all charges and was automatically sentenced to life terms with a chance of parole after serving at least 50 years, meaning that he could be paroled aged 101. The reason for this decision was supposedly remorse for his crimes and encouragement from his family. At the time, he was second-longest serving inmate in Harris County, being detained for only a slightly shorter time than another murderer, Lucky Ward.

As of January 2023, Hobbs is detained at the Ramsey Unit in Rosharon.

== See also ==
- Lucky Ward
