= Crosby High School =

Crosby High School can refer to:

- Crosby High School (Connecticut), located in Waterbury, Connecticut
- Crosby High School (Texas), located in Crosby, Texas
