= Harrison Barrett =

American slave (1845–1917)

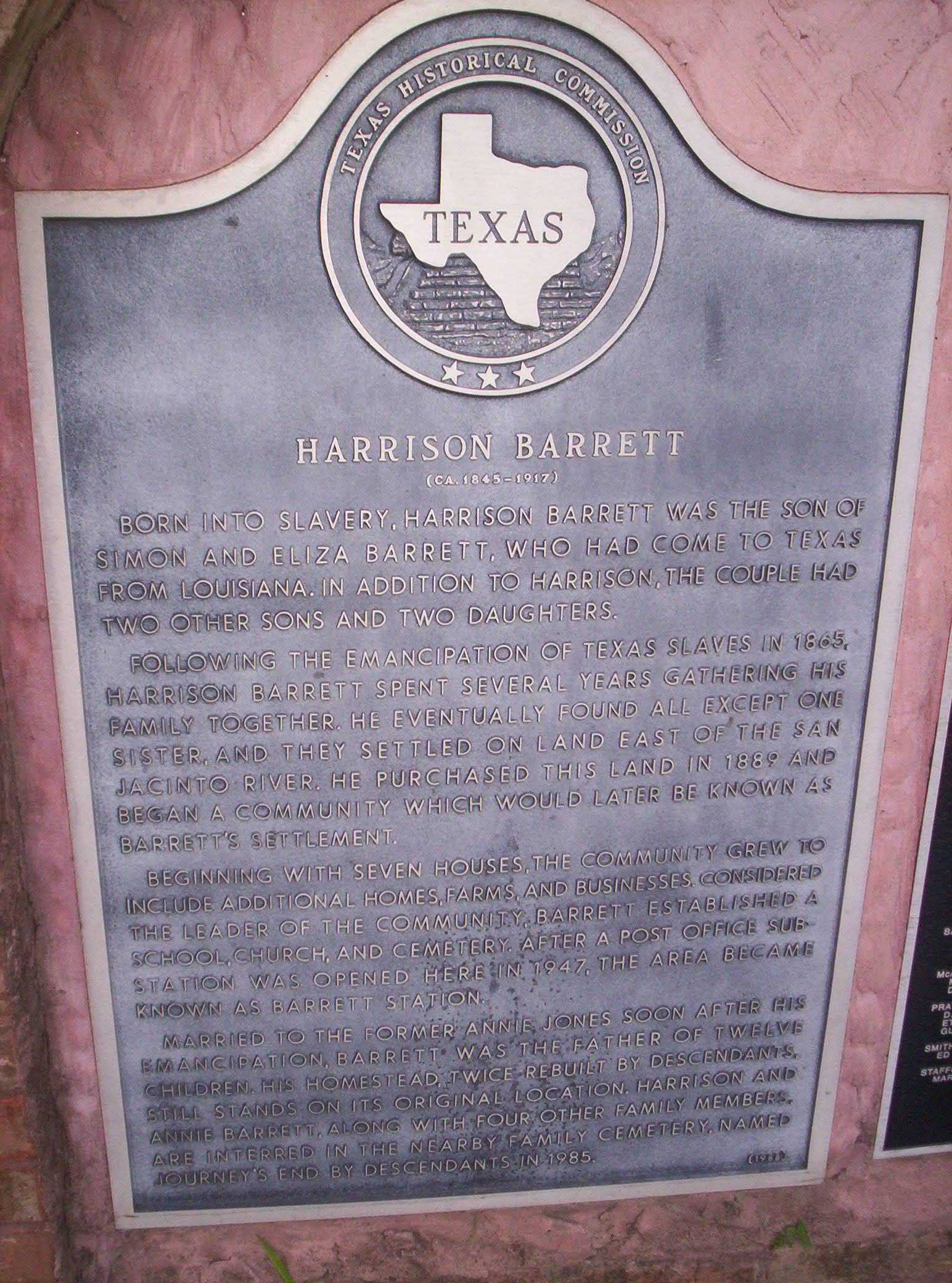
Historical marker commemorating Harrison Barrett in Barrett, TX

Harrison Barrett (c. 1845—1917) was a former slave born in about 1845 to slave parents from Louisiana, Simon and Eliza Barrett. He had two brothers and two sisters. After the emancipation of the slaves in 1865, Barrett searched for his family members. He was able to gather all together except for one sister. In 1889 he purchased land east of the San Jacinto River in Harris County, Texas, for fifty cents an acre, and named the area Barrett Settlement. It was one of the largest holdings in Harris County to be acquired by a former slave. He is interred with his wife Annie Jones Barrett, along with four other family members, in the nearby cemetery.

The community began with seven houses, which Barrett built with lumber from his land. He set up farms, a sawmill, a gristmill, and a coffee mill. He also gave land for Shiloh Baptist Church. The town eventually was given a postal station, and became known as Barrett Station.

The population of the town was 2,872 according to the 2000 census. It remains a largely African-American neighborhood and celebrates its heritage every Juneteenth.

== See also ==
- Barrett, Texas
- Crosby, Texas
