= Education in Houston =

This article is intended to give an overview of the education in Houston.

== Healthcare and scientific research ==
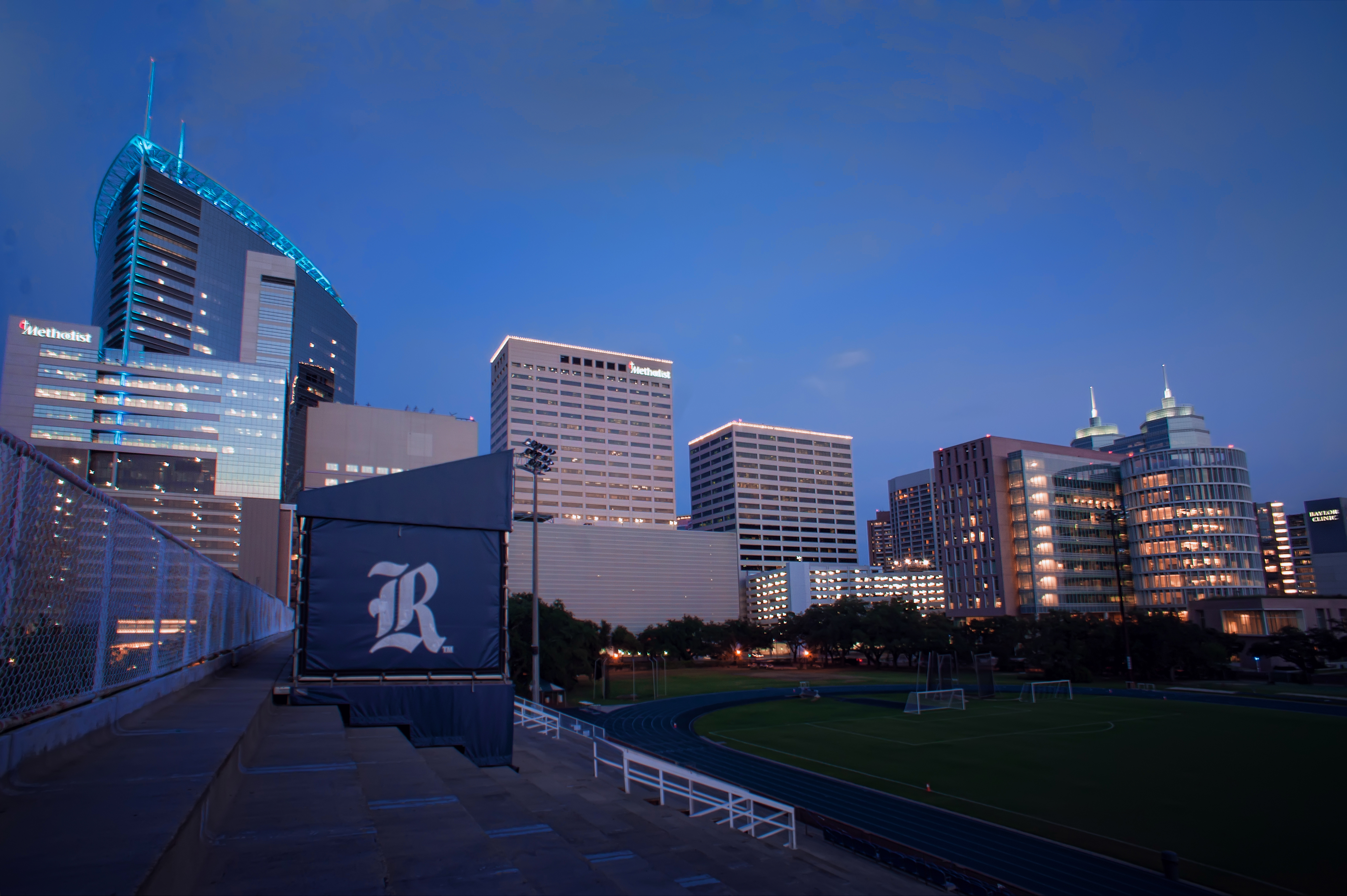
Texas Medical Center

Houston is the seat of the internationally renowned Texas Medical Center, which contains the world's largest concentration of research and healthcare institutions. All 47 member institutions of the Texas Medical Center are non-profit organizations. They provide patient and preventive care, research, education, and local, national, and international community well-being. Employing more than 73,600 people, institutions at the medical center include 13 hospitals and two specialty institutions, two medical schools, four nursing schools, and schools of dentistry, public health, pharmacy, and virtually all health-related careers. It is where one of the first—and still the largest—air emergency service, Life Flight, was created, and a very successful inter-institutional transplant program was developed. More heart surgeries are performed at the Texas Medical Center than anywhere else in the world.

Some of the academic and research health institutions at the center include MD Anderson Cancer Center, Baylor College of Medicine, UT Health Science Center, Memorial Hermann Hospital, The Methodist Hospital, Texas Children's Hospital, and University of Houston College of Pharmacy. The Baylor College of Medicine has annually been considered within the top ten medical schools in the nation; likewise, the MD Anderson Cancer Center has consistently ranked as one of the top two U.S. hospitals specializing in cancer care by U.S. News & World Report since 1990. The Menninger Clinic, a renowned psychiatric treatment center, is affiliated with Baylor College of Medicine and The Methodist Hospital System. With hospital locations nationwide and headquarters in Houston, the Triumph Healthcare hospital system is the third largest long term acute care provider nationally.

== Higher education ==
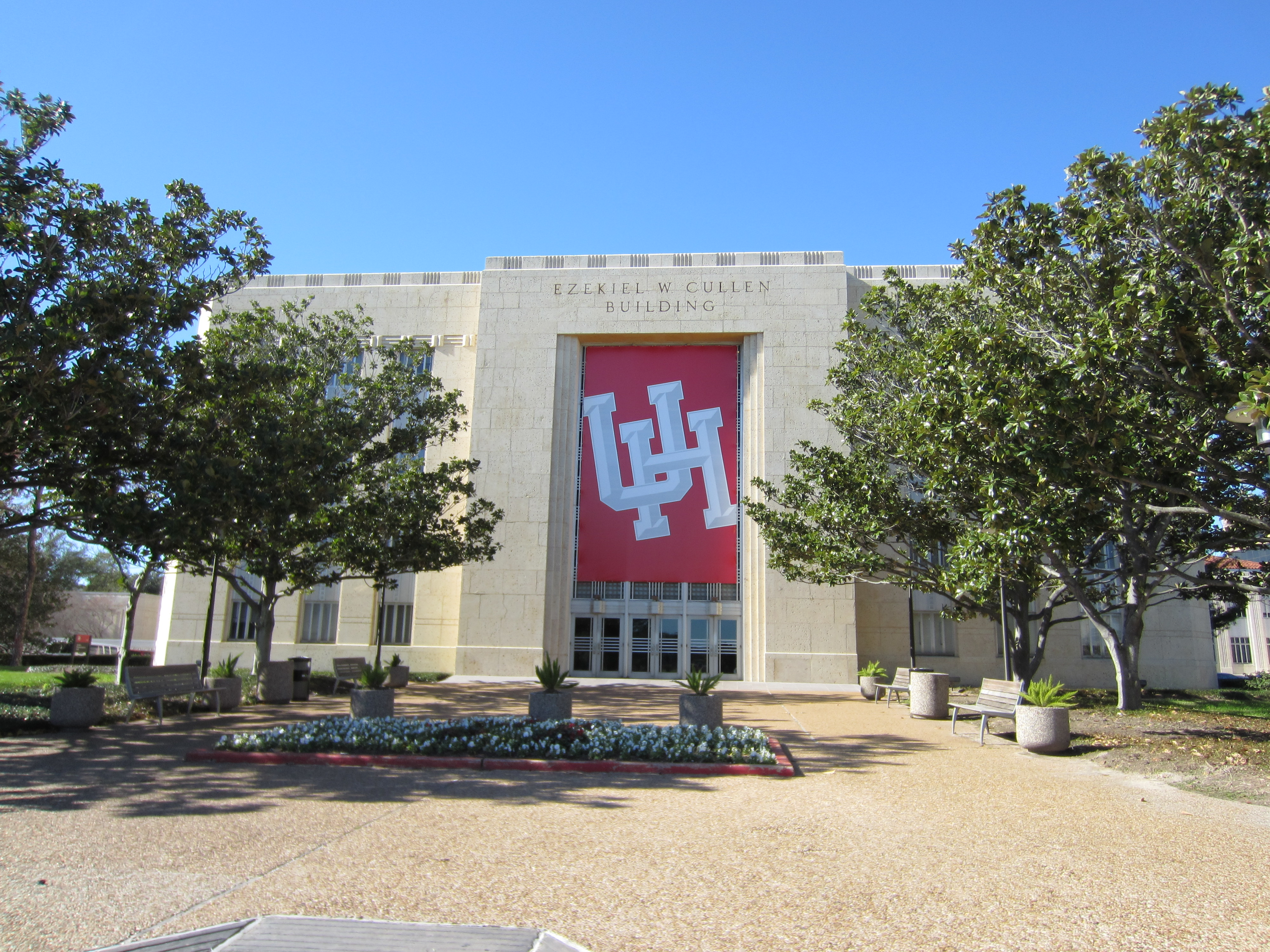
University of Houston

Four separate and distinct state universities are located in Houston. The University of Houston is a nationally recognized Tier One research university and is the flagship institution of the University of Houston System. The third-largest university in Texas, the University of Houston has nearly 44,000 students on its 667-acre campus in southeast Houston as of 2017. The University of Houston–Clear Lake and the University of Houston–Downtown are stand-alone universities; they are not branch campuses of the University of Houston. Located in the historic community of Third Ward is Texas Southern University, one of the largest and most comprehensive historically black institutions in the United States.

The University of Houston System's annual impact on the Houston-area's economy equates to that of a major corporation: $1.1 billion in new funds attracted annually to the Houston area, $3.13 billion in total economic benefit, and 24,000 local jobs generated according to studies in 2006. This is in addition to the 12,500 new graduates the UH System produces every year who enter the workforce in Houston and throughout Texas. These degree-holders tend to stay in Houston. After five years, 80.5 percent of graduates are still living and working in the region.

Several private institutions of higher learning—ranging from liberal arts colleges to a nationally recognized research university—are located within the city. Most notably, Rice University, which is one of the leading teaching and research universities in the United States and consistently ranks in the top 20 of best overall universities as of 2009 by U.S. News & World Report.

Three community college districts exist with campuses in and around Houston. The Houston Community College System serves most of Houston. The northwestern through northeastern parts of the city are served by various campuses of the Lone Star College System, while the southeastern portion of Houston is served by San Jacinto College, and portions in the northeast are served by Lee College. The Houston Community College and Lone Star College systems are within the 10 largest institutions of higher learning in the United States.

== Primary and secondary education ==
A 2007 Money survey stated that 91.1% of the students attending schools within the city limits go to public schools and 8.9 percent go to private schools.

=== Public schools ===
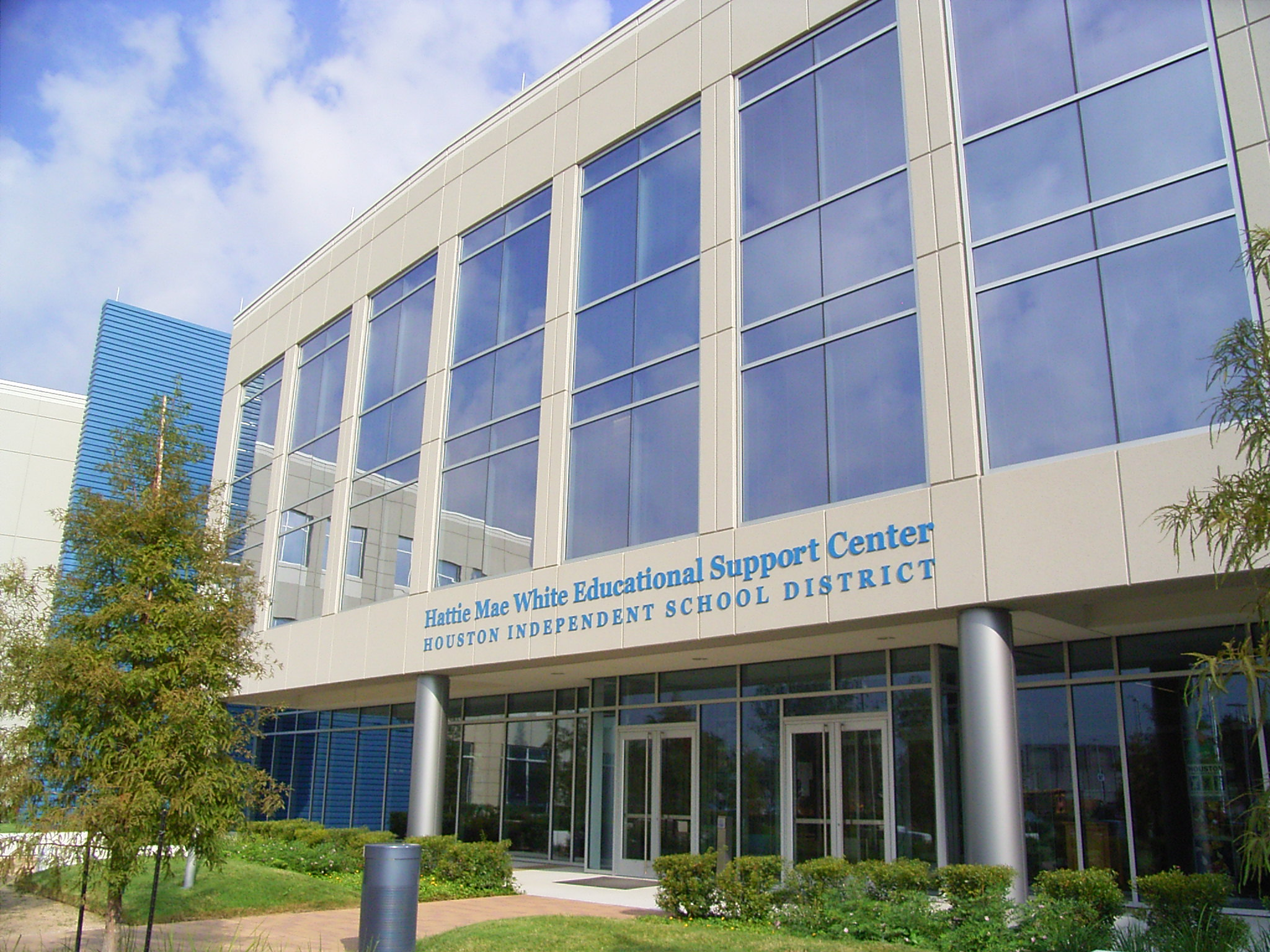
Hattie Mae White Educational Support Center is the headquarters of the Houston Independent School District.

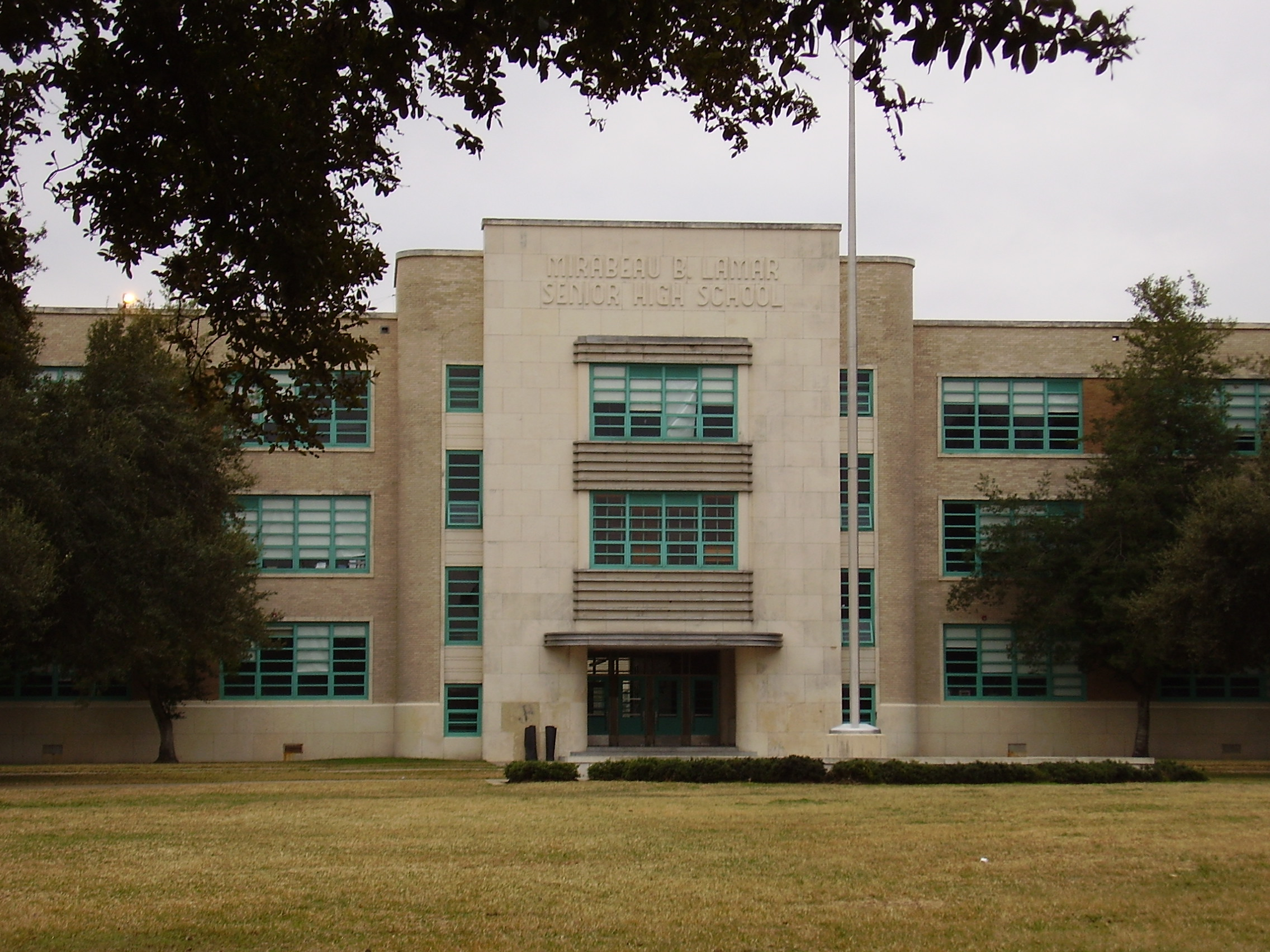
Lamar High School, in central Houston, is of Houston ISD

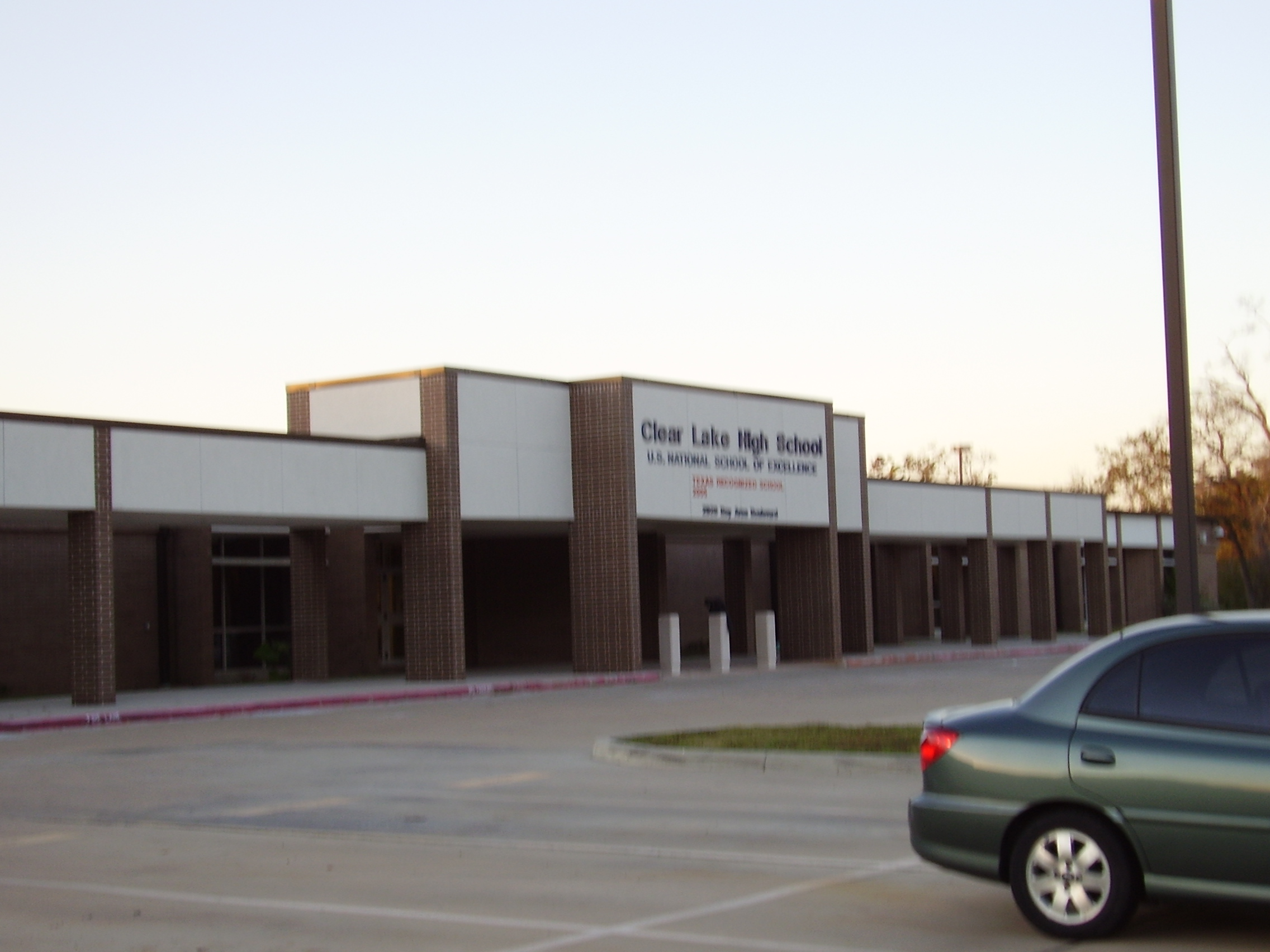
Clear Lake High School, in southeast Houston, is of the Clear Creek ISD

All public school systems in Texas are administered by the Texas Education Agency (TEA). As of 2018 24 school districts serve different sections of the city of Houston. The largest school district serving the city limits is the Houston Independent School District (HISD), which serves a large majority of the area within the city limits. A portion of west Houston falls under the Spring Branch and Alief independent school districts. Aldine takes parts of northern Houston. Parts of Pasadena, Clear Creek, Conroe, Crosby, Cypress-Fairbanks, Fort Bend, Galena Park, Huffman, Humble, Katy, Klein, New Caney, Sheldon, and Spring independent school districts also take students from the city limits of Houston or otherwise cover parts of the Houston city limits.

The North Forest Independent School District served portions of Houston until its July 1, 2013 closure, when it was absorbed by Houston ISD.

There are also many charter schools that are run separately from school districts, but are administered by the Texas Education Agency. In addition, public school districts—such as Houston ISD and Spring Branch ISD—also have their own charter schools.

==== State-chartered charter schools ====
Since 1995 the state of Texas allowed the formation of charter schools. Some charter schools are overseen by traditional school districts while others only have oversight by the State of Texas.

In 2003 charter schools in the Houston area had a combined total of 15,428 students. In 2006, over 25% of charter schools in Texas were located in Greater Houston. In 2006, Todd Ziebarth, a researcher of the National Alliance for Public Charter Schools, said that charter schools may have as many as 15% of the market share of students in Greater Houston. During that year Houston Independent School District (HISD) officials estimated that 12,000 to 13,000 pupils living within the HISD boundaries attend state charter schools. In 2006 around 10,000 students attended HISD-affiliated charter schools.

In 2015 there were over 125 charter school campuses in the area. As of 2017 KIPP Houston had 12,100 students, Harmony Public Schools's Houston-area campuses had 11,000 students, Yes Prep had 9,500 students, Houston Gateway Academy had about 1,900 students, Promise Community School had about 1,700 students, The Varnett School had about 1,700 students, and Excel Academy had 500 students.

==== History of public education ====
In the Jim Crow era African-Americans had inferior K-12 educational conditions, with fewer resources in general and less financial support from the state government and from local governments, compared to other races. Teachers of black African origin had, on average, around 70% of the pay of a white teacher, and black students had fewer teachers per capita compared to white and other racial-ethnic peers.

=== Private schools ===
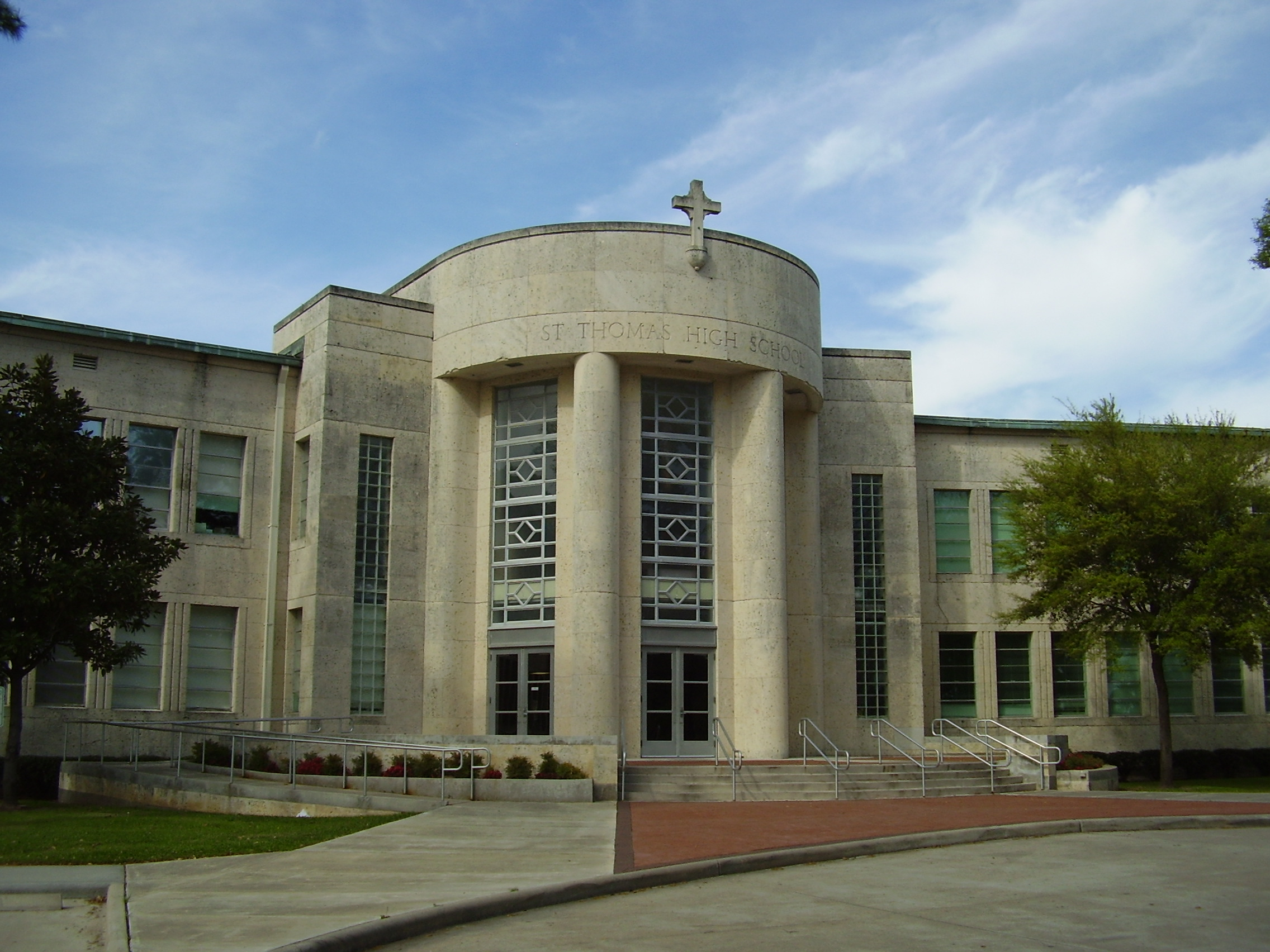
St. Thomas High School

Houston has numerous private schools of all types, including non-sectarian, Jewish, Roman Catholic, Greek Orthodox, Protestant, and Muslim. The Texas Education Agency has no authority over private school operations; private schools may or may not be accredited, and achievement tests are not required for private school graduating seniors. Many private schools will obtain accreditation and perform achievement tests as a means of demonstrating that the school is genuinely interested in educational performance. The Houston area is home to more than 300 private schools and several are well-known. Many of the schools are accredited by an accrediting agency recognized by Texas Private School Accreditation Commission (TEPSAC). In addition, Houston area Catholic schools are operated by the Archdiocese of Galveston-Houston.

- Annunciation Orthodox School
- Archway Academy
- Awty International School (serves as the French international school)
- British School of Houston
- The Emery/Weiner School
- The Kinkaid School
- The Monarch School
- The Lycée International de Houston
- St. Pius X High School
- The Regis School (all-boys)
- Saint Agnes Academy (all-girls)
- Strake Jesuit College Preparatory (all-boys)
- St. Catherine's Montessori School
- St. John's School
- Duchesne Academy of the Sacred Heart (all-girls)
- St. Thomas High School (all-boys)
- First Baptist Academy

Around 1993 increasing numbers of parents in Greater Houston sent their children to private schools. Dick Ekdahl, the executive director of the Independent Schools Association of the Southwest (ISAS), said that a more robust economy, a negative perception of public schools, and increased interest in religious education caused enrollment at private schools to increase. Stephanie Asin of the Houston Chronicle said "[t]here is no central authority over private schools so collecting enrollment statistics is difficult." She added "local headmasters indicate that enrollment is increasing in their schools and believe that holds true throughout the state's estimated 750 private schools." In 1988, the 35 schools of ISAS had a combined enrollment of 16,895. In 1992 the same 35 schools had a combined enrollment of 18,504.

=== Homeschooling ===
The greater Houston area is home to a large homeschooling community with an estimated 40 to 50 thousand homeschooled students, based on 300,000 homeschool students in Texas and 2.04 million in the U.S. Over 100 organizations, support groups, and co-ops provide classes and resources for homeschool families.

== Libraries ==
=== Public libraries ===
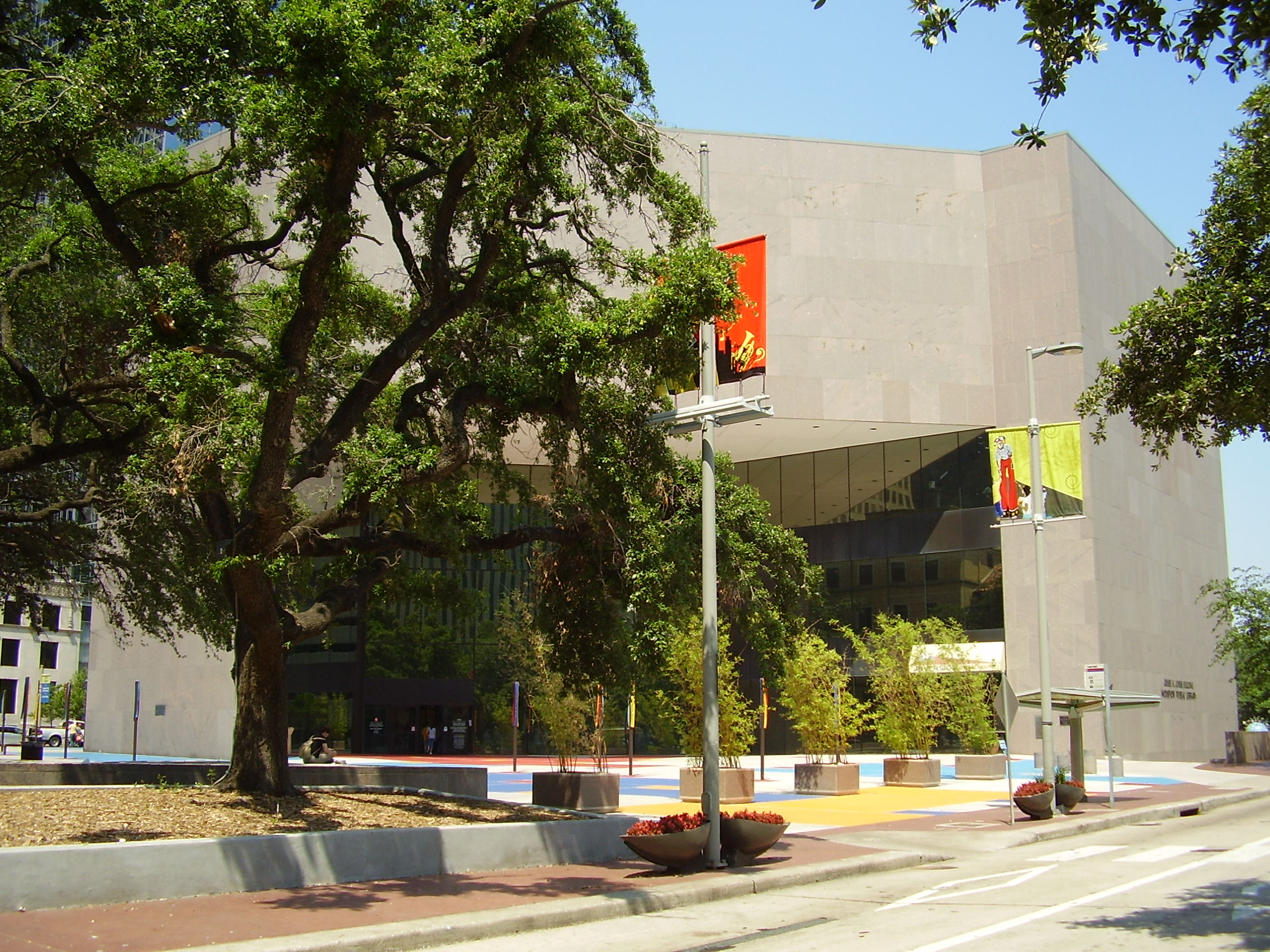
Jesse H. Jones Building of the Houston Public Library

Residents of Houston are served by the Houston Public Library and the Harris County Public Library. The Houston Public Library has 36 branches throughout the city, plus the Central Library, located Downtown. The Harris County Public Library has 26 branches (3 of them in Houston), primarily serving areas outside the city limits of Houston.

University of Houston, Texas Southern University, Rice University, and Houston Baptist University also have university libraries.

=== Private libraries ===
There is one Japanese-language library in Houston, the Sansui-Kai Center Library (三水会センター・図書館).

The Italian Cultural and Community Center has a library in its Logue House (Milford House) offices.

== Miscellaneous education ==
The Japanese Language Supplementary School of Houston, a supplementary Japanese school, is located in the city. Its classes are held at the Westchester Academy for International Studies. The school is for children between ages 5 and 18 who are Japanese speakers. Many of the students are temporarily residing in the United States.

== See also ==
- Education in Texas
- Education in the United States
- List of colleges and universities in Houston
- List of colleges and universities in Texas
