= Thomas Parry (writer) =

Welsh author and academic (1904–1985)

Thomas Parry FBA
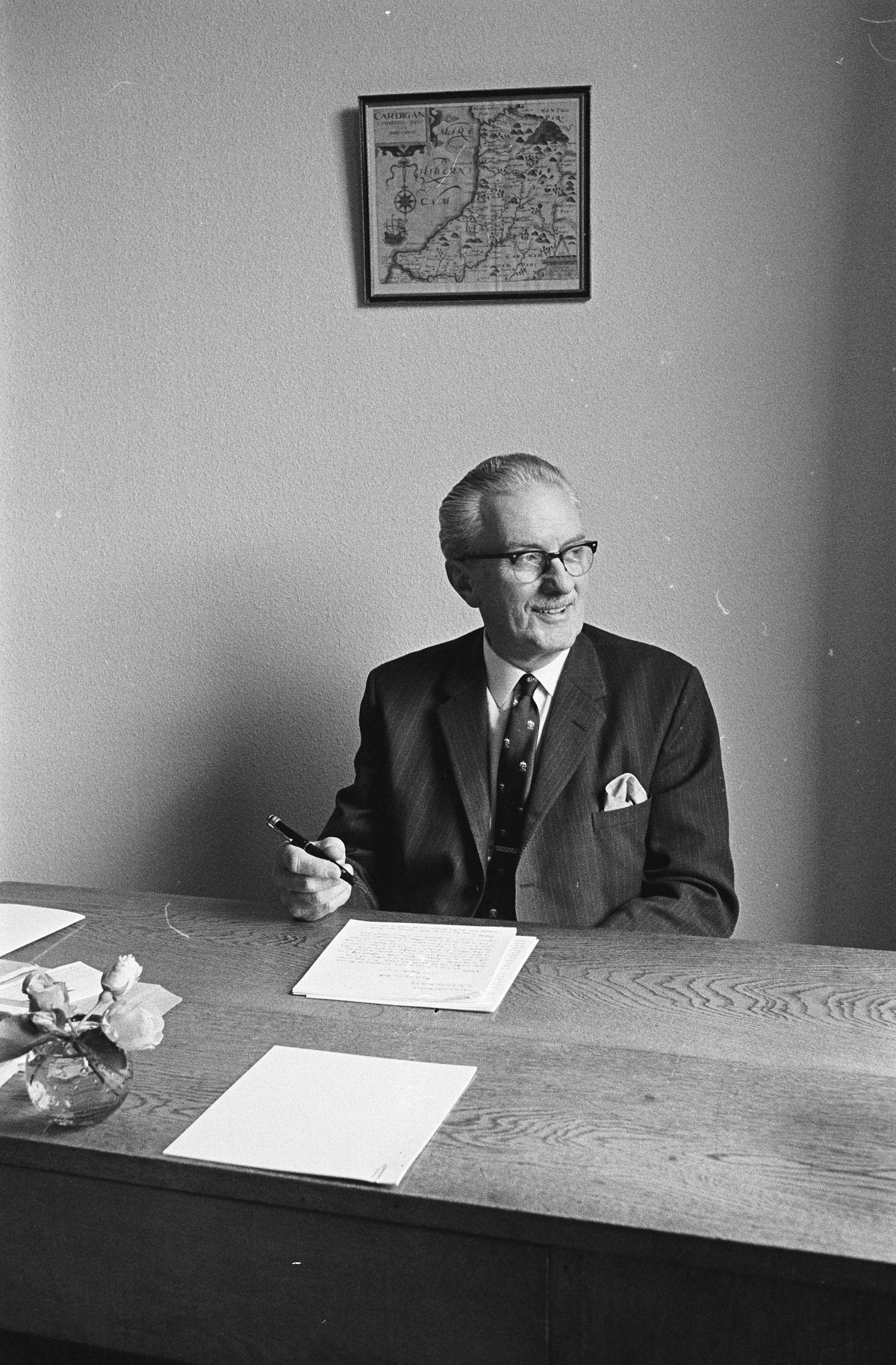
- Image of Professor Thomas Parry on his appointment as Principal of Aberystwyth University College.
- Born: 4 August 1904 Carmel, Gwynedd, Wales
- Died: 22 April 1985 (aged 80)
- Occupation: Writer and academic

Sir Thomas Parry FBA (4 August 1904 Carmel, Gwynedd – 22 April 1985) was a Welsh writer and academic. He was Professor of Welsh at the University College of North Wales, Bangor from 1947 to 1953, Librarian of the National Library of Wales from 1953 to 1958, Principal of the University College of Wales Aberystwyth from 1958 to 1969 and Vice-Chancellor of the University of Wales from 1961 to 1963 and 1967 to 1969.

== Honors and awards ==
He was knighted in the 1978 Birthday Honours.

== Legacy ==
The Thomas Parry Library located on Aberystwyth University's Llanbadarn Campus was named in his honour in 1995.

Academic offices
Preceded by Goronwy Rees	Principal of the University College of Wales Aberystwyth; 1958–1969	Succeeded by Sir Goronwy Daniel
Preceded by William Llewelyn Davies	Librarian of the National Library of Wales; 1953–1958	Succeeded by E. D. Jones
