= Organic fulfilment =

Organic fulfilment is a form of order fulfillment widely recognized in the EU where the distribution center or warehouse holds organic certification to stores and despatched Organic products. The distribution centre or fulfilment house uses a range of comprehensive record keeping to show inventory figures, traceability of stock and of cleaning and hygiene measures to ensure organic standards of the certifying body are met. Standards for organic food are laid down by the European Union.

== History ==
In January 2009 the amended organic EU-Eco-regulation (834/2007) came into force. One of the main effects of the amendment was to tighten requirements for the storage of organic food.

Certification is required for storage of loose products (unpackaged), for example, grain, milk, hay/straw, unpackaged fruit, vegetables or meat. These operations must be certified and inspected annually.

Storage operations that store packed goods must also be certified, (with some exceptions). They must be registered with a certification body and as a minimum, have an initial physical inspection, followed by an inspection at least every three years (Regulation 834/2007 article 27(3)).

== Exceptions ==
Article 28 of EU regulation 834/2007 exempts from certification, operators who sell directly to the end consumer, provided they do not produce, prepare, store other than in connection with the point of sale, or import products from a third country.

Below is a list of operations that do not need to be certified:

- Warehouses owned by, or operating under retailers
- Storage attached to retailers and controlled by the retailer
- Port and airport transit operations (although storage centres holding imported organic good must be inspected)
- Selling of pre-packed goods to the final consumer direct or through the internet
- Transport, (although operators collecting bulk products from more than one point, such as milk hauliers, do need to be certified).

== Standards ==
=== Record Keeping ===
Record keeping must demonstrate traceability of organic products that are handled and stored – including goods in and goods out, stock records and certificates of organic suppliers or clients.

Pest control records – these need to show what pest control treatments have been used and when.

Staff training records – these must show details of training that demonstrate staff are aware of the requirements of organic production.

Complaints register of any complaints you may have received from customers and corrective action that you have taken.

=== Labeling ===
The room, area, or racking must be labeled with the word ‘organic’ to show that it is for storing organic products. Organic materials must be clearly labeled to avoid accidental cross contamination.

=== Separation ===
Sufficient space or barriers must be put in place around organic storage areas to stop accidental contamination.

=== Materials ===
Storage bins and containers that are made of materials suitable for contact with the food they are to store, dedicated and labelled bins and containers as organic prevent contamination by birds, insects and vermin.

=== Cleaning ===
Cleaning the stores regularly so that there are no residues which could contaminate organic products or encourage pests.
