= Southwest School District =

Southwest School District may refer to:

- Southwest R-1 School District (Missouri)
- Southwest R-5 School District (Missouri)
- Southwest Independent School District (Texas)

== See also ==
- Southwest Schools (Texas charter school operator)
