= Fulfillment house =

Modern terms for a packing warehouse

Fulfillment house and fulfillment center (Commonwealth English: fulfilment house and fulfilment centre) are modern terms for a packing warehouse. The terms were coined in the middle of the 1990s: "fulfillment center" usually refers to an in-house packing warehouse, while "fulfillment house" tends to be used about companies that specialize in warehousing and packing for others.

These centers receive products from suppliers or manufacturers, store them in optimized environments, and then pick, pack, and ship items directly to consumers when an order is placed. Unlike traditional warehouses, fulfillment centers focus on order processing for individual consumers rather than bulk shipping to retailers. The efficiency and speed of fulfillment operations are crucial, especially as consumer expectations for rapid delivery continue to rise.

== Origin of term ==
The usage of the word "'fulfillment" in relation to goods shipments comes from the terms "order fulfillment" and "product fulfillment", which were introduced by business management researchers who analysed supply chains in the late 1980s. This was soon picked up by PR people working for packing warehouse companies, who felt that "fulfillment centre" or "fulfillment house" sounded more positive and active than the old term "warehouse". The terms are still so new and unknown by people outside that industry that "warehouse" often is added in parentheses or used as an alternative word in the same text, in order to explain to laymen what "fulfillment centre" or "fulfillment house" actually means.

== External or internal ==
In-house, or internal fulfillment, involves companies managing the entire process, from order processing to delivery and returns. Internal fulfillment centers offer a solution for businesses that don’t have the space or resources to manage their own stock and shipping. They can also help to save time and money by streamlining the process and making the stocking, packing and shipping processes more efficient. This makes it easier for businesses to focus on their core competencies and leaves the fulfilment process to experts who are better equipped to handle it. While this approach offers complete control over operations, it can be challenging to scale and requires significant investments in Infrastructure.

Some companies, such as Amazon, have their own fulfillment centers, while many smaller e-commerce companies outsource their warehousing, picking, packaging and shipping to external fulfillment companies. These external fulfillment companies are known as third-party logistic providers. Many larger companies with their own fulfillment centers also handle warehousing and shipping for other sellers. Amazon itself is one such example, offering to handle warehousing and order fulfillment to third-party sellers. Another, very early, example was Fingerhut, which in the 1990s expanded its own fulfillment center in order to take on fulfillment services for other companies, including the company that eventually acquired Fingerhut: Federated Department Stores.

Another example is Cainiao Network which is Alibaba’s logistics arm, founded in 2013. The company's fulfillment center was constructed in 2014 to support Alibaba in capturing the market of millions of consumers in the Beijing-Tianjin-Hebei megalopolis embracing online shopping. Cainiao Network has also partnered with more than 3,000 logistics companies globally, covering over 224 countries and regions. The company has developed a logistics network that is capable of fulfilling over 400 million orders per day during the peak season.

In External or Third-party Fulfillment brands partner with external logistics providers to manage the fulfillment process, including storage, order processing, and delivery. Although this method involves investments, it frees time and resources for other essential business activities. These hybrid fulfillment models provide practical strategies for optimizing logistics processes and enhancing customer service. Implementing cross-docking, micro-fulfillment, and intelligent distribution can significantly boost business competitiveness in a fast-evolving market.

== Types ==
There are multiple types of fulfillment houses.

1. Cross-docking. Cross-docking is a logistics model that optimizes the distribution of goods between warehouses. In this system, incoming products are not stored for extended periods but are immediately redistributed for further shipment. This minimizes order processing time, allowing goods to reach customers faster.
2. Micro-fulfillment System. Building a micro-warehouse network is a strategy to reduce delivery times, particularly in large cities. Micro-warehouses are located closer to end customers, significantly shortening delivery distances. This not only accelerates order fulfillment but also reduces transportation costs. Moreover, micro-fulfillment improves customer service by enabling more flexible and faster order processing. Implementing micro-fulfillment systems is becoming increasingly relevant amid growing demand for rapid delivery and heightened customer expectations.
3. Intelligent Distribution. Intelligent algorithms for selecting the optimal delivery method represent another critical component of hybrid fulfillment. These algorithms analyze factors, including current conditions, costs, and customer preferences, to determine the most efficient fulfillment approach. For example, an algorithm may decide that one order is best fulfilled through a 3PL service, while another may benefit from dropshipping. This approach reduces costs and enhances business flexibility, allowing companies to adapt to evolving market conditions and consumer preferences.
4. In-house Fulfillment. In-house fulfillment involves companies managing the entire process, from order processing to delivery and returns. While this approach offers complete control over operations, it can be challenging to scale and requires significant investments in infrastructure.
5. Third-party Fulfillment. In this model, brands partner with external logistics providers to manage the fulfillment process, including storage, order processing, and delivery. Although this method involves investments, it frees time and resources for other essential business activities. These hybrid fulfillment models provide practical strategies for optimizing logistics processes and enhancing customer service. Implementing cross-docking, micro-fulfillment, and intelligent distribution can significantly boost business competitiveness in a fast-evolving market.

In the past, a fulfillment center was typically associated with filling larger commercial orders to a retailer or distributor. Today, with the growth of ecommerce, there are fulfillment centers that strictly focus on shipping small parcels direct-to-consumers (DTC). Additionally, some ecommerce fulfillment centers focus on a niche, such as small or large products, a specific type of product (for example, apparel), or they deal only with a certain number of stock keeping units (SKUs).

A subset of ecommerce known as drop shipping, a type of product fulfillment that occurs directly from manufacturers to consumers via 3rd party retail websites, utilizes the manufacturer's or a wholesaler's fulfillment centers to deliver goods to the customer. In drop shipping, the company that generates the sale never handles the physical product, but it does pass on fulfillment requirements to the fulfillment house so that customer demands like two-day shipping can be met.

== Fulfillment house due diligence scheme ==
The UK government believes that fulfillment houses are in a position to facilitate non-payment of VAT on goods imported into the UK. The government argues that this type of abuse is "enabled by misdeclaration and undervaluation of goods imported from outside the EU, and sometimes the abuse of reliefs that are designed to facilitate trade. This is followed by the onward sale of the goods to customers in the UK taking place without the correct amounts of UK VAT being paid" and believes that registering fulfillment houses and requiring due diligence and record-keeping is "part of the solution".

Provision for this "Fulfillment House Due Diligence Scheme" (FHDDS) was included in sections 48 to 59 of the Finance Bill 2017, introduced into the UK Parliament in September 2017. Fulfilment business legislation was adopted within Part 3 of the Finance (No. 2) Act 2017, with secondary legislation, the Fulfilment Businesses Regulations 2018 (SI 326/2018) covering the fulfilment business approval process, obligations of approved businesses, and penalties for non-compliance. Approved businesses are listed online by HM Revenue and Customs (HMRC) so that overseas traders can check whether businesses who store their goods for UK distribution have complied with the registration law.
