= First Baptist Academy =

First Baptist Academy may refer to:

- First Baptist Academy of Dallas, Texas, United States
- First Baptist Academy (Houston, Texas), United States
- First Baptist Academy Universal City
