= Archway Academy =

Therapeutic school in Houston, Texas

Location
- Coordinates: 29.716258°N 95.396400°W

Information
- Website: archwayacademy.org
- Last updated: 8 January 2018

Archway Academy is a sober high school located in Houston, Texas, offering a specialized educational environment for students in recovery from substance use disorders. It integrates academic instruction with comprehensive recovery support services, helping adolescents maintain sobriety while continuing their education. Founded in 2003, Archway is among a small number of recovery high schools in the United States and is considered a model of integrated academic and therapeutic support for youth in recovery.

== Overview ==
Archway Academy serves students in grades 8–12 through a partnership-based structure:

- Southwest Schools, a public charter school, provides certified academic instruction, curriculum, and diplomas.
- Archway Academy, a nonprofit organization, delivers recovery programming, therapeutic services, and operational oversight.
- Palmer Memorial Episcopal Church provides campus space and facilities, located in the Montrose neighborhood of Houston.

Students enroll in both the academic and recovery programs, creating a dual-enrollment model that supports both educational and therapeutic growth.

== Mission and Philosophy ==
Archway Academy’s mission is to provide a supportive and sober learning environment where high school students in recovery can flourish academically, emotionally, and socially. The school embraces a holistic view of recovery, aligning with the Substance Abuse and Mental Health Services Administration's (SAMHSA) definition, which includes the dimensions of health, home, purpose, and community.

Recovery support is grounded in the 12-Step Program, with students guided through each step during their time at Archway. The school also emphasizes trauma-informed care, mental health awareness, and community re-integration.

== Academics ==
Southwest Schools provides Archway's accredited academic program. Students follow the Texas Essential Knowledge and Skills (TEKS) curriculum and can graduate with a state-recognized high school diploma. Class sizes are intentionally small, with a low student-teacher ratio, allowing for individualized attention and accommodations based on students’ recovery and academic needs.

Academic features include:

- Rolling admissions
- Credit recovery options
- Flexible scheduling
- Dual credit and test preparation

== Campus and Student Life ==
Archway’s campus is housed within Palmer Memorial Episcopal Church, offering a secure, inclusive, and respectful environment. In addition to academics and recovery work, students engage in:

- Community service projects
- Leadership opportunities
- Family engagement and education sessions

== Enrollment and Admissions ==
Admissions are rolling, allowing students to join throughout the academic year. The process includes interviews with students and families, a recovery assessment, and academic placement testing. Archway offers financial aid and scholarship opportunities to ensure access regardless of economic status.

The school serves students from a wide range of backgrounds, including public, private, and homeschool settings, and accepts referrals from treatment centers, therapists, juvenile courts, and families.

== Governance and Funding ==
Archway Academy is a 501(c)(3) nonprofit organization governed by a board of directors. Funding comes from a combination of:

- Tuition and fees (often subsidized)
- Philanthropic donations and grants
- Partnerships with community organizations
- Events and fundraising initiatives

The school receives no direct state or federal education funding beyond the academic support provided through Southwest Schools.

== Impact and Recognition ==
Archway has been recognized locally and nationally for its innovative model and outcomes in adolescent recovery and education. Its alumni frequently report improved well-being, educational success, and long-term sobriety. The school is part of a growing movement advocating for recovery high schools as a necessary support for youth substance use recovery.
