= Hargrave High School =

Public school in Texas, United States

Location
- 25400 Willy Lane; Huffman, Texas 77336; United States; 30.041854°N 95.059717°W

Information
- Type: Public high school
- School district: Huffman Independent School District
- NCES District ID: 4823820
- Educational authority: Texas Education Agency
- CEEB code: 443481
- NCES School ID: 482382002633
- Principal: Chandler Simpson
- Teaching staff: 77.46 (on an FTE basis)
- Grades: 9-12
- Gender: Coeducational
- Enrollment: 1,165 (2024-2025)
  - Grade 9: 315
  - Grade 10: 303
  - Grade 11: 258
  - Grade 12: 289
- Student to teacher ratio: 15.04
- Colors: Red, black, and white
- Team name: Falcons
- Website: hhs.huffmanisd.net

Willie J. Hargrave High School is public high school in the Huffman community of unincorporated Harris County, Texas, United States.

The school opened in 2005, and includes grades 9 through 12, and is a part of the Huffman Independent School District, serving unincorporated sections of Harris County and small sections of Houston.

The old Hargrave High School is currently Huffman Middle School. A new high school was built recently.

== Athletics ==
The Hargrave Falcons compete in the following sports:

- Baseball
- Basketball
- Cross Country
- Football
- Golf
- Powerlifting
- Soccer
- Softball
- Tennis
- Track and Field
- Volleyball

=== State Champions ===
- Softball
  - 2015 beat Needville 6-4: UIL 4A
  - 2019 beat Anna 12-0: UIL 4A

== Notable alumni ==
- Keith Foulke (1991), MLB All-Star pitcher
- Jasper Troy (2016), WWE wrestler
