= Humphrey Jackson =

Humphrey Jackson (1784-1833) was a member of Stephen F. Austin's Old Three Hundred Colony. He most famously settled along the San Jacinto River near where the famous battle took place. His small settlement is now Crosby, Texas.
