= Crosby High School (Texas) =

Location
- 333 Red Summit Drive; Crosby, Harris, Texas 77532; United States; 29.89586°N 95.06897°W

Information
- Type: Public high school
- School district: Crosby Independent School District
- Principal: Brad Hadnot
- Staff: 113.46 (on FTE basis)
- Grades: 9–12
- Enrollment: 2,050 (2023–2024)
- Student to teacher ratio: 18.07
- Colors: Red & white
- Mascot: Cougar
- Rival: Dayton High School (Texas)
- Newspaper: The Cougarpolitan
- Yearbook: The Catamount
- Website: chs.crosbyisd.org

Crosby High School is a public high school in Crosby, a community in unincorporated Harris County, Texas. Approximately 1,600 students are enrolled in grades 9 through 12.

Crosby High School is located off FM 2100, approximately 35 miles northeast of Downtown Houston. It serves the Crosby Independent School District. Crosby ISD built a new high school campus that opened fall of 2016. Current administration includes Principal Terry Perkins.

The school serves the census-designated places of Crosby and Barrett.

== History ==
On September 18, 1991, 17-year-old Arthur Jermel Jack was killed by 15-year-old LaKeeta Cadoree, in the cafeteria. Cadoree, still holding the gun, went to the school's office, called her mother, and asked to be taken home. Cadoree then "broke down", according to the Associated Press. The school's assistant principal was able to calm her down and convince her to surrender her weapon. She was arrested, tried, and convicted for Jack's murder and was released after serving 22 years in prison. In 2000 Rudolph Thomas, the principal, resigned from his position. Deborah Frank, an assistant principal, became the new principal.

Football is high on the list of priorities at Crosby High School. This is evidenced by the fact that the head football coach, Jeff Riordan, is paid more than the principal. Jeff Riordan's salary was $117,896, while the principal's (Terry Perkins) salary was only $113,000.

== Academics ==
2011 School Accountability Rating: Met standard. Although Crosby High School met the existing 2016 standard, under the new Texas Education Agency letter grade rankings set to debut in 2018, Crosby High School received 3 - D's and 1 - F in the following areas, Student Achievement (D), Student Progress (D), Closing Performance Gaps (D) and Postsecondary Readiness (F).

=== Dual credit classes ===
Dual credit classes with San Jacinto College North and Lee College.

Dual credit programs: CTE (Career and Technology Education), MECA (Modified Early College Academy), professional certifications.

== Sports ==
- District 5A
- Baseball
- Basketball
- Cross-country
- Football
- Golf
- swimming
- Powerlifting
- Soccer
- Softball
- Tennis
- Track
- Volleyball
- Bass Fishing
- Marching Band

== Notable alumni ==
- Leo Rucka (1950), former NFL linebacker
- J. R. Towles (2002), former MLB catcher
- PJ Haggerty (2022), basketball player for the Memphis Tigers
