= The Lake Houston Observer =

- Type: Weekly newspaper
- Format: Broadsheet
- Owner(s): Hearst Communications
- Publisher: Brenda Miller-Ferguson
- Editor: Melecio Franco
- Founded: 1973
- Headquarters: 907 East Main St. Humble, TX 77338; USA
- Price: Free
- Website: www.yourlakehoustonnews.com

The Lake Houston Observer is a weekly community newspaper serving the Crosby and Huffman communities in northeast Harris County, Texas, United States.

It was owned by ASP Westward LP until 2012, when it was acquired by 1013 Star Communications as part of its acquisition of Houston Community Newspapers. In 2016, the Hearst Corporation acquired Houston Community Newspapers; it is the parent company of the Houston Chronicle. As part of the deal the Observer became a part of the Hearst Corporation.
