= Southwest Schools =

Southwest Schools is an operator of state charter schools headquartered in Houston, Texas, United States.

The school operates several campuses, including:

- Bissonnet Elementary
- Mangum Elementary
- Discovery Middle School
- Nehemiah Middle School
- Empowerment High School
- Phoenix School
- Young Learners

Former

- Southwest High School (Houston)
- Southwest Middle School (Houston)
- Elementary School (Houston)
- Center for Success and Independence (Houston)
- A Child is Born (Alvin)
- Archway Academy (Houston)
- The PaRC (Houston)
- Carter's Kids (Unincorporated Fort Bend County)
- Three Oaks Academy (Houston)
- Totally Fit Institute (Crosby, Unincorporated Harris County)
- Unlimited Visions (Pasadena)

== See also ==
- List of state-operated charter schools in Houston
