= Fusiform body area =

The fusiform body area (FBA) is a part of the extrastriate visual cortex, an object representation system involved in the visual processing of human bodies in contrast to body parts. Its function is to identify the body holistically, similar to but distinct from the extrastriate body area (EBA), which perceives bodies in relation to body parts, and the fusiform face area (FFA), which is involved in the perception of faces. Marius Peelen and Paul Downing identified this brain region in 2004 through an fMRI study.; in 2005 Rebecca Schwarzlose and a team of cognitive researchers named this brain region the fusiform body area.

== Location ==
The FBA shares overlapping structures with the FFA, both are located in Brodmann area 37, specifically a part of the occipital lobe and temporal lobe known as the fusiform gyrus.

The FBA is located on the ventral surface of the brain, on the lateral posterior surface of the fusiform gyrus. Typically activation in the right hemisphere is larger, which suggests a degree of lateralization.

== Function ==
Faces and bodies are often perceived together allowing humans to identify if an individual is familiar or not. Despite this almost simultaneous perception it is important to establish that they are processed by different structures, and thus perceived separately. This has been established as being distinct to the selectivity pattern of the region involved in the processing of faces. It has been proposed that this distinction between face recognition and body recognition is due to bodies providing contextual input to ambiguous stimuli which are later able to be perceived together as a whole.

The FBA is involved in the visual processing of the human body in contrast to body parts, providing us with a holistic image of the human body. This provides a functional dissociation between the EBA and the FBA as they are uniquely involved in the perception of distinct aspects of the human body. The FBA is capable of distinguishing bodies from other object kinds, such as human-like stick figures .

In 2011 a study examining the meaning of actions through context integration proposed that the FBA is involved in a social context network (SCN) which update and associate individual specific information relating to episodic memory and target-context connections. However, due to activation in the FBA not being able to fully explain the integration of contextual information, the significance of this is still under investigation.

== History ==
The FBA was first described by Marius Peelen and Paul Downing in August 2004, and was later named by Rebecca Schwarzlose and her team in June 2005. The FBA is typically investigated through the use of functional magnetic resonance imaging (fMRI) studies. In addition to processing whole body forms, the FBA is able to discriminate between known and unknown bodies During experiments participants typically perform tasks involving viewing faces, bodies; with heads, and with blurred faces, tools, scenes, and unrelated objects while in an fMRI.

=== Experiments and research ===
In the article “Selectivity for the Human Body in the Fusiform Gyrus" researchers Marius Peelen and Paul Downing identified the FBA in 2004, the article was published in 2005. This article challenges the previous notion that the fusiform gyrus was solely involved in the processing of faces, and suggests that this brain region is involved in the processing of various different category-selective representations. This was established through two experiments, the first involved comparisons of faces, bodies without heads, tools and scenes to determine the region of interest activation levels, the second used human-like stick figures to determine if body recognition occurred in more abstract representations. The authors determined that indeed, activation in the FBA was the highest when participants were shown bodies without heads, but also when stick figures resembled a human body.

The article "Separate Face and Body Selectivity on the Fusiform Gyrus" by Rebecca Schwarzlose, Chris Baker, and Nancy Kanwisher named the identified fusiform region by Peelen and Downing (2005) the fusiform body area (FBA). The FBA was again examined through the use of fMRI analysing the mean peak response of the FBA to various stimuli. In this research experiments involving faces, headless bodies, body parts, cars and assorted objects were used as stimuli, and images were gathered across standard resolution and high resolution brain scans. The results of this experiment show that the FBA is selectively responsive to bodies in both the standard and high resolution images, however it is of note that activation at the region of interest is stronger in the high resolution images. The authors suggest that previous activation of the FFA in response to bodies may have been due to activation on the FBA that was yet to be identified.

Distinction between the EBA and the FBA has been clearly explained in the article "Functional MRI Analysis of Body and Body Part Representations in the Extrastriate and Fusiform Body Areas" by John Taylor, Alison Wiggett, and Paul Downing in 2007. The FBA was found to be most responsive to the visual appearance of large body segments, but ideally the whole body. This was established through two experiments. The first used images of human body parts including human torsos without the head in neutral positions (positions that did not elicit an emotional reaction from participants), arms with hands and fingers, hands with fingers, and just fingers. The second experiment was similar to the first however it used tree stimuli that were similar to the human body parts, the stimuli were images of whole trees (representing the human body), branches with leaves (arm), clusters of leaves (hand), and individual leaves (fingers). The authors found that FBA activation was steplike in response to torsos and larger body images (such as arms) relative to smaller body parts, although the response to smaller body parts was non-zero the response was significant when the whole torso was visible. This is in comparison to the findings for the EBA which showed a linear pattern of activation, a gradual increase in activation as more of the body was visible. This is evidence that there is a functional distinction between the FBA and the EBA.

== Anorexia nervosa implication ==
There is evidence that the FBA plays a critical role in how individuals with anorexia nervosa (AN) perceive their own bodies and the bodies of others. In the article Body Image Distortion Reveals Amygdala Activation in Patients with Anorexia Nervosa – a Functional Magnetic Resonance Imaging Study" by Gert Seeger and colleagues found that as well as amygdala activation (the brain's fear network), there was activation in the right gyrus fusiform in anorectic patients, but not healthy age-matched controls. This suggests that due to being overly aware and critical of body forms, increased activation in what we now know as the FBA is to be expected. As this study was conducted before the identification of the FBA, the fusiform gyrus activation can be considered previous evidence for the FBA being involved in body perception.

In the 2013 article "Reduced Connectivity Between the Left Fusiform Body Area and the Extrastriate Body Area in Anorexia Nervosa is Associated with Body Image Distortion" Suchan and colleagues determined that the perceptual distortion associated with AN can in part be explained by the reduced connectivity between the EBA and the FBA; both brain regions involved in visual body processing. Results from this study strongly suggest that EBA activation modulates FBA activation, and the authors indicate that visual information converge at the FBA for processing and due to a lack of simultaneous processing due to reduced connectivity a perceptual distortion occurs. The authors note that further research into the significance of this connectivity is needed.
