= Lucky Ward =

American murderer and suspected serial killer on death row

- Born: November 1, 1964 (age 61); Brazoria County, Texas, U.S.
- Other name: Lawayne Jackson
- Convictions: Capital murder (2 counts); Robbery (2 counts); Aggravated assault with a deadly weapon Deadly weapon in a penal institution Possession of cocaine
- Penalty: Death

Details
- Victims: 2 convicted 6 total suspected
- Span of crimes: September 13 – 30, 2010 (convicted); 1985–2010 (suspected)
- Country: United States
- State: Texas
- Date apprehended: November 4, 2010
- Imprisoned at: Allan B. Polunsky Unit, West Livingston, Texas

Lucky Ward (born November 1, 1964) is an African-American suspected serial killer, who was convicted of strangling two people in September 2010 in Houston, Texas. He was accused of four other homicides, one dating back to 1985, none of which were ever prosecuted. He was convicted and sentenced to death on one count of capital murder based on the theory that two different individuals, Gypsy Rodriguez and Reita Long, were killed as part of the "same scheme or course of conduct." This conviction was obtained after a 10-year delay in his trial. Since his arrest in 2010, he has consistently denied any knowledge of Rodriguez's death, but has admitted responsibility for Long's death, although he denied an intent to kill her.

He is on Texas's death row and is appealing his conviction and sentence.

== Early life and crimes ==
Lucky Ward was born on November 1, 1964, in Brazoria County, Texas. He grew up in an unstable home, where he was physically and mentally abused. His mother gave him to her brother, who was known to sexually abuse children, when Lucky was a baby; his uncle raised him until he was about seven. He later spent some time with his violent father who once dragged him behind a car to which he was chained. These experiences affected his mental health and led him to be diagnosed with schizoaffective disorder and bipolar disorder. At age 14, he sexually assaulted an 83-year-old woman in Brazoria County. He was arrested and confessed the same day.

After spending two years in juvenile prison, he was released at age 16 and sent back to his abusive family despite a recommendation that he not be returned to his mother. Soon thereafter, he was accused of assault, tried as an adult, and sent to adult prison at age 16. He was released from prison briefly in 1985. After being sent back to prison in 1985, he was in the custody of the Texas prison system until 2006. Upon being released, Ward became homeless and addicted to drugs.

From 2006 until his arrest for the capital crime in November 2010, he was repeatedly arrested and served time in the Harris County jail for a variety of crimes, including soliciting prostitutes; possession and distribution of controlled substances; resisting arrest; theft; failure to identify himself to law enforcement and criminal mischief. He was housed in the section of the jail used for people with mental illness and given psychotropic medications. He was written up for numerous infractions and accused of assaulting another inmate. He showed jail staff how he had been able to unlock his cell; an educational video was made of him demonstrating the process. But he never attempted an escape.

== Murders ==
Ward is accused of targeting homeless women and trans women. At trial, the state's case was the murders of Long and Rodriquez were part of the “same scheme or course of conduct.” Ward is challenging this finding on appeal. Each victim was allegedly strangled, but none were sexually assaulted.

While Ward awaited trial for Long and Rodriguez's murder, law enforcement endeavored to link him to several other unsolved murders. One of these was the 1985 murder of Birdell Louis. Ward was not considered a suspect in Louis's death until 2013 and only because of law enforcements express intent to try to link him to other crimes; during trial, it was revealed that the Long investigation's lead detective directed a cold case detective to look for unsolved strangulation cases that police might be able to link to Ward. The cold case of a woman named Birdell Louis was identified because it had occurred when Ward was not in prison; her body had been found behind a gas station near downtown Houston. Initially, the primary suspect in Louis's murder was her abusive ex-boyfriend who had reportedly choked and threatened her shortly before her death; but that investigation was, for unknown reasons, abandoned. During Ward's trial, a latent print examiner testified that Ward's palm print could not be excluded as a match to a partial palm print lifted from a pair of glasses found near Louis's body. No other physical evidence linked Ward to the murder. Louis's ex-boyfriend's fingerprints were never obtained or compared to the prints found at the crime scene; not was his DNA collected or his profile compared to the many items from which Ward was excluded. Ward was not indicted for Louis's murder, but details of the crime were presented to his jury in 2020 as if he had been the perpetrator.

The second suspected victim was 51-year-old Myra "Chanel" Ical, a transgender woman. She was found dead in a grassy area near a highway on January 18, 2010. Investigators spent ten years attempting to link Ward to Ical's murder. Right before his trial began, using a new probabilistic genotyping software known as “STRmix,” the State claimed that one swab from Ical's body contained a mixture of DNA from at least four different contributors. After assuming that the mixture contained only four contributors, an analyst claimed that Ward could not be excluded from one of the four. This was the first time the Houston crime lab had ever used this software. Ward was excluded as a contributor to the large quantity of more traditional DNA testing of materials gathered from that crime scene. The testimony regarding his possible inclusion in a mixture of four or more contributors to a single sample was the only evidence of any kind connecting Ward to Ical's murder. He was never charged with this crime but testimony about the murder was put before his jury during his 2020 trial.

Houston law enforcement endeavored to attribute another unsolved murder to Ward that had occurred in 2010. On June 18, the partially decomposed body of 24-year-old Raquel Antoinette Mundy, a single mother with two children from Galveston, was found in a grassy field on 300 St. Charles, near some railroad tracks. While dropping off her mother and children at a Greyhound bus station, Mundy's car was towed, leaving her stranded. She was last seen entering the car of a Hispanic man in the downtown depot. Before her death, Mundy sent her mother a text message expressing fear that “this Mex” might hurt her. Ward, who is not Hispanic and did not own a car, was considered a suspect after his arrest for Long's death, but he was never charged with Mundy's murder.

One of the two murders he was convicted of, but denies committing, occurred on September 13, 2010. 46-year-old Gypsy Rodriguez, a transgender woman and hairdresser, was found dead in an apartment she shared with two men. Though she was found nude, there was no signs of sexual assault. One of Rodriguez's roommates reported that he had seen her engaged in consensual sex with a bald black man soon before she was found dead. Ward, who was not bald, admitted that he had met Rodriguez, whom he believed to be biologically female. He had agreed to watch her car while she went to clubs, and Rodriguez took a picture of Ward, which Ward himself later identified for the police. But Ward has consistently denied knowing anything about Rodriguez's death, which occurred in her apartment in North Houston.

The other murder he was convicted of occurred on September 30. Ward met with 52-year-old Reita Lafaye Long, a former teacher and friend of his who lived on the streets, who was sitting in front of the steps of the Co-Cathedral of the Sacred Heart. According to later interviews, the pair got into a heated argument that turned violent, and Ward, then high on crack cocaine, strangled her with her own bra. Her body was discovered in the morning by a security guard. The night of his arrest on November 4, 2010, Ward confessed to police that he must have killed Ms. Long, claiming he had not intended to do so but had panicked when she “went off” on him.

The final suspected victim was 62-year-old Carol Elaine Flood, a homeless woman. She was found on the outside stairwell of a YMCA building in downtown Houston on October 10. Flood was found strangled to death with a scarf still around her neck and nude from the waist down with injuries to her face. During his trial, YSTR testing results showed Ward was among a quantity of African-American males who could not be excluded from one sample from the unstained portion of Flood's scarf. Ward was excluded from all other DNA testing that was undertaken. No other physical evidence connected him to the crime scene. Ward was briefly indicted for Flood's murder, but that indictment was dismissed. Yet evidence of Flood's murder was put before Ward's jury during the guilt-phase of his trial for the alleged murders of Rodriguez and Long.

== Arrest, trial, and imprisonment ==
After Rodriguez's body was discovered, police attempted to identify people depicted in photos on Rodriguez's digital camera. One police officer recognized Lucky Ward as one of the men in the photos. After being approached by the police, on October 1, 2010, Ward saw a print out of the photo of him and identified himself. Ward then agreed to go to the police station to explain what he remembered about his picture being taken. In the police interview, Ward explained that he had offered to watch Rodriguez's car, in exchange for a tip, while she went into a club. Rodriguez took a photo of Ward standing next to her car. Ward speculated that she wanted a record in case something happened to her car. The police let Ward go after the interview.

Ward was arrested and brought to the police station for a custodial interview on November 4, 2010. After being told about Long's death, he confessed and explained that he had mental problems, had been off his medications, and was addicted to crack cocaine. He was then asked about Flood. He denied having anything to do with Flood's death. He was soon thereafter indicted with Long's murder and Rodriguez's murder as well. The evidence in the remaining killings was deemed too insufficient to hold up in court. District Attorney Kim Ogg eventually announced that she would seek the death penalty in his case, due to the severity of the crimes.

For nearly ten years, Ward's murder trial was delayed on numerous occasions. Among the reasons for the delay was the prosecution's requests for more time to test a vast quantity of items for DNA that had never been tested, although they had previously reported that DNA evidence had connected Ward to an array of murders. A trial date was also cancelled due to Hurricane Harvey. While awaiting trial, Ward had a severe mental breakdown and requested to represent himself. He was also written up by jail staff on multiple occasions. In 2018, a sheriff's spokesman labeled him one of the most dangerous and high-maintenance inmates to be detained in the county.

When the trial began, Ward suffered from a mental health crisis and was absent from most of the trial due to his breakdown. When given the option to testify on his behalf, he initially contemplated doing so, but ultimately decided to follow his lawyers’ recommendation not to testify.

During its deliberation, the jury sent two notes requesting exhibits referenced at trial. It is unclear if the court ever responded to the first note. The second note stated that the jury did not have the October 1, 2010, police interview related to the Rodriguez case and requested a copy. In response, the court told the jury that the requested exhibit was already in their possession. After five hours of deliberation, Ward was eventually found guilty for the murders of Rodriguez and Long. After several more days of testimony, during which the State focused on other murders they sought to attribute to Ward, he was summarily sentenced to death. He showed no reaction while the verdict was read out, but as he was escorted out of the courtroom, he turned towards one of Ms. Long's family members and said that he was sorry.

As of January 2024, Ward is on death row at the Allan B. Polunsky Unit in West Livingston and is appealing his conviction and sentence, denying that he committed the murders.

== Current Appeals ==
Based on a pending state habeas application filed on Lucky Ward's behalf and currently on hold in the trial court, the following life history should have been investigated and shared with his jury to explain why sentencing him to death was morally inappropriate.

In addition to a complex personal history that Lucky Ward's jury did not hear, the pending appeal cites new evidence of police and prosecutorial misconduct during the ten years Harris County spent trying to adduce evidence to link him to various unsolved murders. The habeas appeal argues that, in all but one case (of Reita Long), the evidence points to other more likely suspects who were not pursued and exposes the tenuous nature of the links made to Ward as not withstanding scientific scrutiny.

=== Abusive Father ===
Although the jury heard from Lucky's maternal Aunt, Edna Hadden, that his mother Micky hated her son Lucky from the outset because she thought he looked like his father, General Lee Ward, Edna Hadden had a great deal more to share regarding General Lee.

General Lee's relationship with Micky was marked by physical violence, sexual assault, and exploitation, with General Lee controlling Micky and isolating her from family and friends. General Lee pushed Micky into sex trafficking by forcing her to sleep with other men. He raped her before, during, and after Lucky's birth. Indeed, Lucky was likely conceived in a rape. Once, while Micky was pregnant with Lucky, General Lee raped her with a flashlight.

When he was a child, Lucky observed General Lee mercilessly beating his stepsister's mother, Diane. On occasion, General Lee would randomly pull his car over while driving and start hitting her head against the door. Once, General Lee sat on her chest with his knees and began punching her in the mouth, knocking out two of her teeth. When Diane became pregnant with Lucky's youngest half-sibling, General Lee kicked and jumped on Dian's stomach, telling her that he wanted her to miscarry the baby. Ultimately, the baby was born and formally diagnosed with an intellectual disability as a toddler.

General Lee also abused Lucky. Around 1974, General Lee hit Lucky in the head and chained him to a car and dragged him. General Lee frequently banged Lucky's head into hard objects such as cars and walls while Lucky stayed with him intermittently from ages 7–13.

=== Mother's Substance Abuse ===
The jury heard from Edna Hadden and Dr. Murrie that Micky and her siblings liked to drink alcohol and "party." However, they did not hear the specifics of her extensive substance abuse problems. Micky routinely drank to excess, starting in high school. According to multiple family members, she continued using illicit drugs and alcohol during her pregnancy with Lucky. Indeed, Dr. Murrie briefly mentioned that Lucky was likely exposed to alcohol while in utero. Lucky would go on to develop conditions commonly associated with in utero alcohol exposure: drug dependence, depression, psychotic symptoms, and anxiety or bipolar disorder.

The effects of Micky's substance abuse did not fade once Lucky was born. Drinking had taken over Micky's life. She would see her children only for brief intervals when coming home to change clothes, when they would beg her to stay home with them. Micky would turn to family members to watch her children for what was supposed to be one night on the town, only to disappear for days on end. When Micky’s family stopped agreeing to watch the children, Micky resorted to leaving her children in the car while she was drinking inside or bringing them into bars with her. Other times she would bring the party home, despite the children.

=== Head Injuries ===
The jury should have heard the evidence that made full neurological and neuropsychological workups imperative. For example, Lucky sustained several head injuries as a child that are believed to have resulted in seizures and disorientation throughout his life thereafter. These include his father repeatedly hitting him in the head or banging his head on hard objects, being chained to and dragged behind a car, and being hit in the head with a baseball bat by his older sister which left him unconscious with bone fragments protruding from his head. He remains on seizure medication as part of chronic care. Lucky also began experiencing migraines and seizures as a preteen, which were accompanied by slurred speech and poor vision. Even prison and jail clinicians over the years observed Lucky’s disconnection from reality, psychomotor alterations, and other signs of traumatic brain injury and saw a need for head scans.

=== Childhood Neglect and Deprivation ===
The jury did not hear the full extent of the poverty and hardships Lucky experienced as a child. According to relatives and neighbors, Lucky experienced starvation as a result of abuse and the family's chronic financial instability. Micky, his mother, frequently withheld food from Lucky and sent him to bed without dinner as punishment. This resulted in Lucky digging in people's gardens for food, stealing money to buy food, and stealing food from the corner stores.

=== Physical Abuse ===
In addition to the abuse suffered at the hands of his father, Lucky was also repeatedly abused by Micky's romantic partners. Witnesses described Lucky being treated "like a slave." He was beaten with water hoses, bull whips, and fan belts. Neighbors repeatedly heard Lucky's screams coming from the house. Micky told her sisters that she did not care if her partners killed Lucky.

=== Sexual Abuse ===
When Lucky was only one year-old, his mother entrusted him to the care of his Uncle JC. Uncle JC had a reputation as the family "pervert" due to his repeatedly grabbing young female relative's breasts in front of others at family functions. Beginning around five years old, JC taught Lucky how to perform oral sex on his wife. JC's wife would go on to repeatedly rape Lucky while JC directed them and took photographs. When JC was single, he brought Lucky along on his escapades and would direct Lucky to perform oral sex on female strangers in his truck while in the parking lot.

At age 8, while Lucky was still living with JC, Lucky was molested by a female cousin who would force him to engage in sex acts, such as performing oral sex on her when no one was home. Several years later, at just 11 years-old, Lucky was led into a secluded wooded area and anally raped by an older male cousin. He would be abused by yet another older male cousin just a few years later.

After General Lee resurfaced in Lucky’s life, General Lee orchestrated what he believed was Lucky’s first sexual experience by paying to have one of the many prostitutes who roamed up and down Dowling Street in Third Ward have sex with Lucky. Lucky protested; he was not yet 10 years-old. He was quiet and hung his head in shame as General Lee walked him back home afterwards. But General Lee saw this as “making him a man.”

Lucky was also molested by his mother's adult friends. He was about 13 years-old when it first happened.

=== Life at School ===
The jury only heard form the State witness Kyle Teat that Lucky performed poorly in school due to failing a grade and getting into fights. However, they could and should have heard that Lucky's elementary and junior high school peers and academic staff recognized that he stood out as poor in a low-income community because he did not have many clothes and was often hungry. This obvious poverty, coupled with his small size, made Lucky a target of relentless bullying and fights. At school, Lucky would avoid changing clothes for PE class because he did not want his peers to see the purple marks and swollen welts on his body. He would sometimes skip school altogether to hide his injuries and avoid embarrassment.

=== TYC Incarceration ===
The jury heard about Lucky's first criminal case, which sent him to what was then known as Texas Youth Council or "TYC" from 1979 to 1981. However, the jury was not given a complete picture of what that meant. In the years in which Lucky was in its custody, physical and psychological brutality characterized TYC. Indeed, the facility was under federal investigation for systemic abuse, neglect, and unconstitutional treatment of youth during Lucky's time at TYC. The mental health care was grossly inadequate at TYC, relying on part-time psychiatrists and psychologists and involving frequent misuse of potent psychotropic medications like Thorazine. Lucky did not receive the structured care recommended by psychologist Dr. Ronald Smith.

During his time at TYC, Lucky was again preyed upon, this time by "counselors" who sexually assaulted him.

Reforms to TYC came too late for Lucky. In 1984, three years after his release, the Morales Settlement Agreement mandated reforms including individualized treatment, trauma-informed care, and safe, humane conditions—services that directly aligned with Lucky’s needs but had not been available to him. Eventually, however, TYC's institutional failures were so severe that the agency was placed under conservatorship in 2007 and ultimately abolished in 2011.

=== Mental Illness ===
Lucky's first psychotic experience was a pre-adolescent when he heard the voice of God calling to him while he lay in a field. He complained to his family about these voices but was discouraged from talking about his condition, which resulted in no early intervention. These events pre-dated his substance use.

Lucky also experienced auditory hallucinations, which early on sometimes demanded him to harm himself. Lucky grew paranoid, believing he was being followed, poisoned, or that people were conspiring against him. After nearly a decade of suffering from undiagnosed mental illness in the free world, Lucky finally received treatment from mental health providers in TDCJ units in the 1980s. He was diagnosed as suffering from bipolar disorder and schizophrenia.

Lucky was depressed and weighed down by a strong desire to kill himself. He cut his wrists. He tried to hang himself. He swallowed pills, requiring his stomach to be pumped. By the early 1990s, TDCJ had documented three suicide attempts. Lucky's suicide attempts and self-harm episodes often led to extreme psychiatric crisis interventions, such as being stripped naked and placed in four-point restraints, with all four limbs strapped down to protect him from himself.

While in TDCJ and the Harris County jail, Lucky heard "bad spirits" that told him to hurt himself. He believed police were following him. He head the TV and radios sending him messages. He withdrew from others. He could not sleep.

The State's records chronicled many of the worsening signs of Lucky's florid mental illness:

- A 2008 mental health record recounts Lucky stating that the "voices are getting stronger" and prevent him from doing anything.
- In 2009 and 2010, prior to Lucky’s arrest for the capital charge, Lucky reported his delusional belief that his father, General Lee Ward, had been poisoned to death in the 1970s. He began contacting his family members to report this fear. The medical records reflect that General Lee died from cancer, with no evidence of foul play.
- Lucky began receiving care through the Bristow program (an outpatient care program for adults experiencing homelessness) but was not coping well. His clothing and medications were stolen while sleeping on the street, and the doctor noted that Lucky had motor retardation and an anxious mood with flat affect. The octordadvised him to attend regular appointments and increase the levels of his anti-seizure medication.
- Lucky's ability to avail himself of psychiatric care and prescribed medication was inconsistent at best. In 2010, doctors noted that he wasn't always able to keep up with his prescriptions and had run out of his seizure and COPD medication.
- Lucky applied for SSI benefits in 2009 and was evaluated in 2010. Evaluators found that Lucky was not malingering but was chronically mentally ill and in need of social services.
- Lucky's perpetual paranoia of other's motives caused him to avoid hospital staff and other mental health providers. Indeed, SSI evaluators noted that in the spring of 2010, Lucky refused to take his psychiatric medication until he could be seen by a doctor.
- After Lucky received approval for SSI benefits, his sister, Donetta Ward was made the custodian. She frequently used the benefits for herself, exacerbating Lucky's paranoia.
- Lucky sought treatment from Cheyenne Center Services, a treatment center that provided short-term housing and resources. Clinicians worked with him to educate him on why he needed to take his psychiatric medications even when he was feeling better and noted that his memory issues were causing friction in being able to remember all of his appointments.
- In May 2010, Lucky enrolled himself in services with a Mental Health and Mental Retardation Center (MHMR). The MHMR clinician noted that Lucky had motor retardation, was soft spoken, had blunted affect, and limited insight. The doctor confirmed his history of chronic paranoid psychosis, recurrent depression, and seizure disorder. They ordered the continuation of Wellbutrin at 150 mg, Tegretol 200 mg but to discontinue Risperdal and instead start Geodon, another anti-psychotic medication. MHMR began a treatment plan to tackle symptom management, coping skills, anger management, rehab, and lab work. Lucky was told to return to the clinic in five weeks and was referred to other clinics for therapeutic groups.
- Around July and August 2010, Lucky was robbed of all his belongings. This left him disoriented and resulted in him missing two psychiatric appointments and going off his medications for two months.
- In October 2010, Lucky re-enrolled in an MHMR Center. He was evaluated for schizophrenia and diagnosed with schizoaffective disorder, among other conditions. The facility noted his significant issues with employment and housing, and moderate (3 out of 5) issues with risk of harm, support needs, functional impairment, and co-occurring substance use.
- Lucky then missed or was denied care at two appointments at MHMR. MHMR attempted to locate Lucky on October 29, 2010 but his whereabouts were unknown. They scheduled an appointment for November 8, 2010. Lucky did not attend the appointment due to his arrest on November 4, 2010.

In addition to Lucky's personal struggles with mental illness, his family had a long history of multi-generational mental illness. Lucky's mother, Micky, had a history of traumatic brain injuries and asphyxiation during her childhood that may have explained her behavioral and emotional instability. Lucky's grandfather, Crad Dickson, was comitted to a mental hospital as he believed that people were following him and using "hoodoo" to harm him. Similarly, Lucky's youngest sister and his maternal aunt both claimed to have heard the voice of God speaking to them. Lucky’s maternal aunt has seen their shadows and beings accompanying the voices. Lucky’s maternal grandmother exhibited signs of psychosis, such as seeing objects move and having visions of the future. Regarding Lucky's father, General Lee, many in the family believed he suffered from a mental disorder, likely bipolar. This was due to his reputation for cycling through sleepless nights and over-the-top episodes of energy and rage.

== See also ==
- Capital punishment in Texas
- List of death row inmates in the United States § Texas
