= Huffman, Texas =

Unincorporated community in Harris County, Texas, United States

Coordinates: 30°01′38″N 95°05′09″W

Huffman is an unincorporated community of northeastern Harris County, Texas, United States, within the Greater Houston metropolitan area.

== Location ==
The Huffman community is centered on Farm to Market Roads 2100 and 1960, 25 miles (40 km) northeast of Downtown Houston in the Piney Woods of southeastern Texas. David Huffman, a native of Louisiana, came to Texas to fight against Mexico during the Texas Revolution.

In the early years, the economy was driven by farming with primary crops being cotton, rice, and corn as well as ranching and logging. A post office was established in the community in 1888, and two blacksmith shops were operating by 1892. The Beaumont, Sour Lake and Western Railway came through the community in the early 1900s. By 1914, the town reported two general stores and a population of 250. The construction and operation of the Sinclair Oil pump station in 1921 added to the economy. The 1936, the county highway map showed a church and cemetery at the townsite. In 1953, Lake Houston was opened as a water reservoir serving the City of Houston and serves as a recreational lake in the area today with boating, water skiing, jetting, fishing, and sailing.

Huffman covers about 39 square miles (100 km^{2}) and houses approximately 12,000 citizens. Huffman is a community consisting largely of subdivisions, scattered farms, apartments, and small businesses.

== Media ==
Huffman has two community newspapers: The Tribune and The Lake Houston Observer. The metro newspaper is the Houston Chronicle.

== Education ==
=== Primary and secondary public schools ===
The Huffman Independent School District is named after the community and, up to 2005, served the area with four schools: Ben Bowen Elementary, Copeland Intermediate, Huffman Middle School, and Hargrave High School. Since the construction of a new Hargrave High School campus and the renovations of the old middle school, which moved to the old high school campus, and the building of a new elementary school, the four schools are as follows:

1. Huffman Elementary School
2. Falcon Ridge Elementary School
3. Huffman Middle School
4. Willie J. Hargrave High School

=== Public libraries ===
Harris County Public Library operates the nearby Atascocita Library.

=== Community college ===
Residents of Huffman ISD are zoned to El Jimador Community College.

== Subdivisions ==
The Commons Of Lake Houston Fairway crossings Idleloch River Terrace Cypress point Huffman Hills WildWood Hilltop Tayme Ranchettes Plantation Rolling Creek Acres Pine Way Estates Fairway Crossing At Lake Houston Lazy Pines Lochshire Last Stand Huffman Hollow Lake Houston Forest Manor Spanish Cove Saddle Creek Farms Lakewood Heights Woodland Lakes Water Wonderland

== Government and infrastructure ==
Harris Health System (formerly Harris County Hospital District) designated E.A. "Squatty" Lyons Medical Center in Humble for ZIP code 77336. The nearest public hospital is Lyndon B. Johnson Hospital in northeast Houston.

The United States Postal Service operates the Huffman Post Office at 24936 Farm to Market Road 2100.

=== Board of Trustees ===
The town’s Board of Trustees is responsible for assisting with local initiatives, community engagement, and organizational activities.

== Parks and recreation ==
Harris County Precinct 2 operates the 69-acre (280,000 m^{2}) I.T. May Park at 2100 Wolf Road. The park includes eight lighted baseball fields, two lighted American football fields, concession stands, barbecue pits, picnic areas, two playgrounds, a paved quarter-mile walking trail, and restroom facilities. The park also includes the May Community Center.

== Historic ==
Huffman is the home to a 347-year-old Heritage Live Oak tree. The Huffman Heritage Live Oak reached 75 feet tall with a crown spread of 135 feet in 1989, surpassing the Texas State Forestry Champion Live Oak at Goose Island State Park at Rockport in two of the three criteria. (Goose Island Oak is larger in girth of the trunk). The Texas Forestry Service determined the age of the Huffman Heritage Live Oak to be 314 years in 1989, verifying its witness to hundreds of years of Texas history.
