= Barrett, Texas =

- Census-designated place
- Location in Harris County and the state of Texas
- Coordinates: 29°52′19″N 95°3′43″W
- Country: United States
- State: Texas
- County: Harris

Area
  - Total: 6.62 sq mi (17.14 km^{2})
  - Land: 6.39 sq mi (16.55 km^{2})
  - Water: 0.23 sq mi (0.59 km^{2})
- Elevation: 43 ft (13 m)

Population (2020)
  - Total: 5,223
  - Density: 501/sq mi (193.3/km^{2})
- Time zone: UTC-6 (Central (CST))
  - Summer (DST): UTC-5 (CDT)
- ZIP code: 77532
- Area code: 281
- FIPS code: 48-05696
- GNIS feature ID: 1372401

Barrett, also named Barrett Station, is an unincorporated community and census-designated place (CDP) in Harris County, Texas, United States. The population was 5,223 at the 2020 census. It was founded in 1889 by Harrison Barrett, a formerly enslaved person.

== History ==
Located south of Crosby and the present-day Highway 90, Barrett's Settlement was founded by Harrison Barrett (1845–1917) and has been registered in the Texas Family Land Heritage as Texas Century Farm.

Born into slavery, Barrett was the son of Simon and Lisa Barrett, who came to Texas from Louisiana. Following the emancipation of enslaved persons in Texas in 1865, Barrett spent several years gathering his family together. He eventually found all of them except one sister, and they settled on land east of the San Jacinto River. He purchased this land in 1889 and began a community that later would be known as Barrett's Settlement. Beginning with seven houses, the community grew to include additional homes, farms, and businesses. Barrett established a school, church, and cemetery. After a post office station was opened there in 1947, the area became known as Barrett Station. Harrison Barrett's homestead, twice rebuilt by his descendants, stands on its original location.

== Geography ==
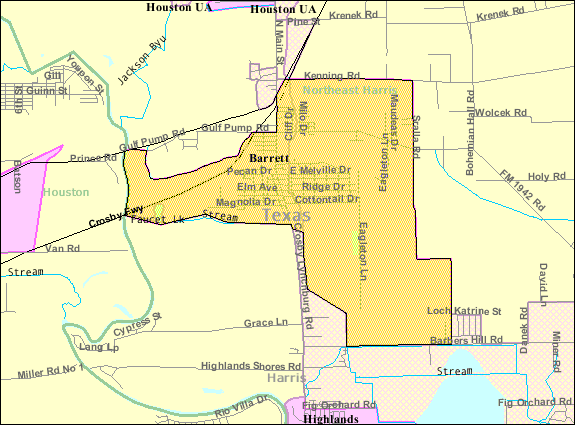
Map of the Barrett CDP

Barrett is located in eastern Harris County at 29°52′19″N 95°3′43″W (29.871849, -95.062065). U.S. Route 90 (Crosby Freeway) passes through the northwestern part of the community, with access from two exits. US 90 leads southwest 22 miles (35 km) to downtown Houston and northeast 16 miles (26 km) to Dayton.

According to the United States Census Bureau, the CDP has a total area of 17.1 square kilometres (6.6 sq mi), of which 6.4 square miles (16.6 km^{2}) are land and 0.2 square miles (0.6 km^{2}), or 3.42%, are water. The CDP boundary extends west to the San Jacinto River, one of the main tributaries of Galveston Bay.

== Demographics ==
Historical population
Census	Pop.	Note	%±
1960	2,364		—
1970	2,750		16.3%
1980	3,183		15.7%
1990	3,052		−4.1%
2000	2,872		−5.9%
2010	3,199		11.4%
2020	5,223		63.3%
U.S. Decennial Census; 1850–1900 1910; 1920 1930 1940; 1950 1960 1970; 1980 1990 2000; 2010 2020

Barrett first appeared as an unincorporated community in the 1960 U.S. census and then as a census designated place in the 1980 United States census.

=== 2020 census ===
Barrett CDP, Texas – Racial and ethnic composition Note: the US Census treats Hispanic/Latino as an ethnic category. This table excludes Latinos from the racial categories and assigns them to a separate category. Hispanics/Latinos may be of any race.
Race / Ethnicity (NH = Non-Hispanic)	Pop 2000	Pop 2010	Pop 2020	% 2000	% 2010	% 2020
White alone (NH)	181	213	554	6.30%	6.66%	10.61%
Black or African American alone (NH)	2,479	2,463	2,324	86.32%	76.99%	44.50%
Native American or Alaska Native alone (NH)	8	7	20	0.28%	0.22%	0.38%
Asian alone (NH)	0	0	25	0.00%	0.00%	0.48%
Native Hawaiian or Pacific Islander alone (NH)	0	0	0	0.00%	0.00%	0.00%
Other race alone (NH)	6	6	23	0.21%	0.19%	0.44%
Mixed race or Multiracial (NH)	21	38	87	0.73%	1.19%	1.67%
Hispanic or Latino (any race)	177	472	2,190	6.16%	14.75%	41.93%
Total	2,872	3,199	5,223	100.00%	100.00%	100.00%

As of the 2020 United States census, there were 5,223 people, 1,251 households, and 900 families residing in the CDP.

As of the census of 2000, there were 2,872 people, 946 households, and 741 families residing in the CDP. The population density was 442.8 inhabitants per square mile (171.0/km^{2}). There were 1,034 housing units at an average density of 159.4 per square mile (61.5/km^{2}). The racial makeup of the CDP was 86.56% African American, 8.64% White, 2.89% from other races, and 1.57% from two or more races, 0.35% Native American. Hispanic or Latino of any race were 6.16% of the population.

There were 946 households, out of which 35.1% had children under the age of 18 living with them, 47.1% were married couples living together, 25.5% had a female householder with no husband present, and 21.6% were non-families. 18.7% of all households were made up of individuals, and 7.1% had someone living alone who was 65 years of age or older. The average household size was 3.03 and the average family size was 3.46.

In the CDP, the population was spread out, with 29.8% under the age of 18, 8.7% from 18 to 24, 27.6% from 25 to 44, 23.0% from 45 to 64, and 10.9% who were 65 years of age or older. The median age was 34 years. For every 100 females, there were 94.2 males. For every 100 females age 18 and over, there were 88.6 males.

The median income for a household in the CDP was $31,343, and the median income for a family was $35,074. Males had a median income of $32,250 versus $20,781 for females. The per capita income for the CDP was $12,333. About 23.1% of families and 23.7% of the population were below the poverty line, including 17.4% of those under age 18 and 33.6% of those age 65 or over.

== Education ==
Barrett residents are zoned to the Crosby Independent School District.

The CDP is divided between the attendance boundaries of Barrett Elementary School and Drew Elementary School.

Public schools serving all of Crosby ISD include Crosby Kindergarten Center, Drew Intermediate, Crosby Middle School, and Crosby High School.
