= Fulfillment by Amazon =

Order fulfillment service

Fulfillment by Amazon (FBA) is an order fulfillment service operated by Amazon that allows third-party sellers to outsource storage, packing, shipping, returns processing, and customer service to Amazon's fulfillment network.

== History ==
Fulfillment by Amazon was launched on September 19, 2006, alongside WebStore by Amazon. The service expanded Amazon's third-party marketplace by allowing businesses to use Amazon's warehouse and logistics infrastructure for order fulfillment.

In the following years, FBA expanded internationally through programs including FBA Export, Pan-European FBA, and the European Fulfilment Network (EFN), which enabled sellers to distribute inventory across multiple Amazon marketplaces. Amazon also introduced Multi-Channel Fulfillment (MCF), allowing sellers to use FBA inventory to fulfill orders placed through external sales channels such as Shopify.

In 2018, Amazon introduced the Inventory Performance Index (IPI), a scoring system measuring seller inventory efficiency. By 2020, sellers had used FBA to fulfill more than 5.5 billion orders in the United States.

Later, Amazon revised its FBA fee structure by introducing an inbound placement service fee for splitting up an inventory across multiple warehouses, a fee for sellers with low inventory relative to customer demand, and updated aged inventory surcharges or "long-term storage fees", while reducing standard fulfillment fees for standard-size products by an average of US$0.20 per unit.

In 2025, Amazon announced it would discontinue U.S. FBA prep and labeling services effective January 1, 2026, requiring inventory to arrive fully prepared and labeled. In the same year, Amazon also launched its Recommended Prep Service Providers program, which includes MyFBAPrep, a provider with more than 85 million square feet of U.S. warehouse space.

In 2026, Amazon announced Amazon Supply Chain Services (ASCS), which expanded Amazon's freight, distribution, fulfillment, and parcel shipping infrastructure to businesses not selling on Amazon's marketplace.

== Operations ==
FBA operates on a fee-based model in which sellers ship inventory to Amazon fulfillment centers, where Amazon stores products and manages picking, packing, shipping, returns, and customer service after orders are placed. Amazon also offers optional prep and labeling services for products requiring additional preparation through a Recommended Prep Service Providers program.

FBA fees include per-unit fulfillment fees based on product size and weight, monthly storage fees based on cubic footage, inbound placement service fees, aged inventory surcharges for goods stored longer than 181 days, and low-inventory-level fees. Storage capacity is managed through the Inventory Performance Index, which scores sellers from 0 to 1,000 using metrics related to excess inventory, stranded inventory, and in-stock rates.

Through Pan-European FBA, sellers can store inventory in France, Germany, Italy, Spain, or Poland, while Amazon redistributes inventory among participating countries based on projected demand.
