= Crosby Independent School District =

School district in Texas, United States

Address
- 14670 FM 2100 Crosby, Texas, 77532; United States

District information
- Type: Independent school district
- Motto: Tradition...With a Future
- Grades: PK–12
- Superintendent: Paula Patterson
- Schools: 8 (2016)
- NCES District ID: 4815750
- District ID: 101906

Students and staff
- Students: 6,868 (2023–2024)
- Teachers: 402.44 (on an FTE basis) (2023–2024)
- Staff: 379.01 (on an FTE basis) (2023–2024)
- Student–teacher ratio: 17.07 (2023–2024)
- District mascot: Cougar
- Colors: Red / White

Other information
- TEA District Accountability Rating for 2017: Met Standard
- Website: www.crosbyisd.org

Crosby Independent School District is a public school district based in unincorporated Harris County, Texas, United States within the Houston–Pasadena–The Woodlands metropolitan area. Crosby ISD serves the communities of Barrett and Crosby.

== History ==
The origin on Crosby ISD started before the founding of the district itself, the schools being organized before the turn of the 20th century as the Crosby Common Schools district No. 17. In 1884 Crosby reported a population of 50, a school, a Baptist church, and a general store. In 1905 it had one school with four teachers and 122 students. The Crosby Independent School District was chartered by a special session on Friday June 27, 1919 of the 36th 2nd Called Session of the Texas Legislature under the leadership of Governor William P. Hobby, Lieutenant Governor Willard Arnold Johnson, and Speaker of the House Robert Ewing Thomason. From 1919 until the 1937-1938 school year, the Highlands area was also a part of Crosby Independent School District until it was transferred into the Goose Creek Independent School District.

According to Texas Education Agency Snapshot 2016 District Detail, Crosby ISD served 5,666 students. 16.3% were African American, 34.9% Hispanic, 45.9% Caucasian, 0.3% Native American, and 0.4% Asian.

From 2013-2016, Crosby Independent School District had the highest school district tax rate in Harris County at $1.67 per $100 valuation.

In 2009, the school district was rated "academically acceptable" by the Texas Education Agency.

In 2010 Keith Moore, previously the Corsicana Independent School District assistant superintendent of special programs, became superintendent. In January 2018 Moore resigned effective June 30, 2018. Scott Davis was announced to be Moore's successor in May 2018. Davis left in 2020. In March 2021, Mrs. Paula Patterson was named the lone finalist in the district's superintendent search. Her tenure began April 8, 2021.

In October 2018 the district laid off 34 contracted employees, including teachers, due to financial issues. The district was able to do this since it had declared financial emergency. It will also convert its prekindergarten program to a half-day program instead of a full-day program in Spring 2019, and this was also a consequence of its financial issues.

By 2023 the district had over 40 unfilled teaching positions. By then, the administration proposed a four day school week, which would make the district the first in the county to adopt such a schedule. There were some parents in the district who argued that such a move would increase their burden in seeking childcare during the week. The board of education approved the new scheduling that year.

== District administration ==
=== Superintendents ===
- Michael Joseph (-2010)
- Dr. Keith Moore (2010-2018)
- Dr. Kirk Lewis (2018-) Interim Superintendent
- Dr. Scott Davis (2018-2020)
- Paula Patterson (Current)

== Schools ==
=== Secondary schools ===
- Crosby High School

Crosby High School is located off FM 2100 in Crosby, Texas, approximately 35 miles northeast of downtown Houston. The building was renovated in 2005, including the addition of two new wings and a second story. In 2016 the new high school building opened.

- Crosby Middle School

Crosby Middle School is located off FM 2100 in Crosby, Texas, which is approximately 35 miles northeast of downtown Houston. The middle school currently serves almost 1,428 students in the sixth, seventh and eighth grade. Crosby Middle School is currently ranked as "Academically Acceptable" under the TEA Accountability ratings (See p. 11) as of the 2008-2009 school year. Despite occasional drops, the middle school has had an overall trend of increases in test scores since 2004.

The middle school celebrated its 25th anniversary in the 2007-2008 school year. The building was renovated in 2005 and has had ongoing renovations since then. One of the most recent additions is the memorial garden on the bus porch created as a service project by LOTC (JROTC).

=== Elementary schools ===
- Drew Elementary School (Kindergarten-5)
- Newport Elementary School (1-5)
- Barrett Elementary School (Kindergarten-5)
- Crosby Elementary School (1-5)
- Crosby Kindergarten (Pre-K and Kindergarten)
