= Crosby, Texas =

- Census-designated place
- Location in Harris County and the state of Texas
- Coordinates: 29°54′38″N 95°3′39″W
- Country: United States
- State: Texas
- County: Harris

Area
  - Total: 2.3 sq mi (5.9 km^{2})
  - Land: 2.3 sq mi (5.9 km^{2})
  - Water: 0 sq mi (0.0 km^{2})
- Elevation: 46 ft (14 m)

Population (2020)
  - Total: 3,417
  - Density: 1,500/sq mi (580/km^{2})
- Time zone: UTC-6 (Central (CST))
  - Summer (DST): UTC-5 (CDT)
- ZIP code: 77532
- Area code: 281
- FIPS code: 48-17756
- GNIS feature ID: 1355392

Crosby is a census-designated place in Harris County, Texas, United States. Its population was 3,417 at the 2020 census.

== History ==
The site north of U.S. Route 90 (according to some) was an encampment nicknamed Lick Skillet in 1823 by Humphrey Jackson, one of the 300 original Anglo colonists to settle Texas. The name "Lick Skillet" came from the phrase, "The East Texas oxen team drivers sipped the spring sweet water and licked their skillets clean."

Humphrey Jackson (1784–1833) moved to Texas from Louisiana in September 1823, and built a log cabin outside Austin's colony on the San Jacinto River, 0.5 miles (800 m) west of the site of present-day Crosby. On August 16, 1824, the Baron de Bastrop granted him title to a league and a labor of land, including the place where he had settled, in what is now Harris County. Jackson next petitioned the Mexican government to form the San Jacinto District under control of the Austin colony; he was elected alcalde of the new district in 1824, 1825, and 1827, and served as ex officio militia captain of the San Jacinto area. Jackson was buried at Crosby. Jackson's Bayou in eastern Harris County is probably named for him.

In 1860, the town was named Gentry after President of the Sabine and Galveston Bay Railroad and Lumber Company, A. M. Gentry who constructed the 41 miles of railroad from Houston to Liberty in what was called the Texas and New Orleans Railroad, Texas Division. The first general store was built in 1865 by Charlie Karcher, and thereafter the town would become a shipping and retail center for lumber and agricultural products.

The railroad was eventually taken over by the Southern Pacific Railroad and rebuilt. The platform that had been built with a sign showing the name "Gentry" was located and a new depot built. In 1877, the town was renamed by former judge, state representative, legislator, and vice president of the railroad, Josiah Frasier Crosby, and a post office was established. By 1884, Crosby reported a population of 50, a school, a Baptist church, and a general store. In 1905, it had one school with four teachers and 122 students. As of 1929, the population was about 600, but the Great Depression reduced this number by half. World War II brought the population to over 900, and the population continued to grow.

For a brief 19 days in 1953 (from December 19 to 31), the town of Crosby briefly changed its name to Hope, Texas, to participate in a contest conducted by comedian Bob Hope. Reported in a news transcript from WBAP-TV in Fort Worth, Texas; "Hope recently announced that he would like to have a pretty girl from every city in the nation named Hope to appear on his television show next Tuesday. Maine, Rhode Island, Michigan, Kansas, and Indiana are sending representatives, so the folks in Crosby decided they'de [sic] get into the act. The result: they changed the town's name to Hope and set about naming a queen. The town will keep its new name until New Years Day, then it will become Crosby, Texas, again."

== Geography ==
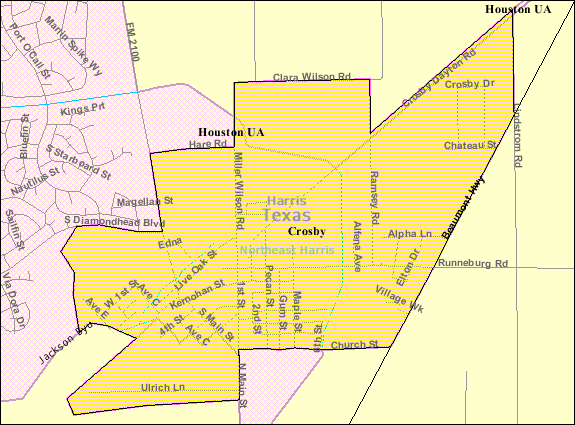
Map of Crosby CDP

Crosby is located at 29°54′38″N 95°03′39″W (29.910577, −95.060882).

According to the United States Census Bureau, the CDP has a total area of 2.3 square miles (6.0 km^{2}), all land, which is located north of the historical Barrett Station.

=== Climate ===
The climate in this area is characterized by hot, humid summers and generally mild to cool winters. According to the Köppen climate classification, Crosby has a humid subtropical climate, Cfa on climate maps.

== Demographics ==
Historical population
Census	Pop.	Note	%±
1970	1,118		—
1980	1,533		37.1%
1990	1,811		18.1%
2000	1,714		−5.4%
2010	2,299		34.1%
2020	3,417		48.6%
U.S. Decennial Census; 1850–1900 1910; 1920 1930 1940; 1950 1960 1970; 1980 1990 2000; 2010 2020

Crosby was first listed as a census designated place in the 1970 U.S. census.

=== Racial and ethnic composition ===
Crosby CDP, Texas – Racial and ethnic composition Note: the US Census treats Hispanic/Latino as an ethnic category. This table excludes Latinos from the racial categories and assigns them to a separate category. Hispanics/Latinos may be of any race.
Race or ethnicity (NH = Non-Hispanic)	Pop 2000	Pop 2010	Pop 2020	% 2000	% 2010	% 2020
White alone (NH)	1,154	1,325	1,497	67.33%	57.63%	43.81%
Black or African American alone (NH)	215	132	299	12.54%	5.74%	8.75%
Native American or Alaska Native alone (NH)	6	7	6	0.35%	0.30%	0.18%
Asian alone (NH)	7	14	24	0.41%	0.61%	0.70%
Native Hawaiian or Pacific Islander alone (NH)	0	5	1	0.00%	0.22%	0.03%
Other race alone (NH)	4	0	6	0.23%	0.00%	0.18%
Mixed or multiracial (NH)	13	26	118	0.76%	1.13%	3.45%
Hispanic or Latino (any race)	315	790	1,466	18.38%	34.36%	42.90%
Total	1,714	2,299	3,417	100.00%	100.00%	100.00%

=== 2020 census ===
As of the 2020 census, Crosby had a population of 3,417. The median age was 29.8 years. 32.7% of residents were under the age of 18 and 9.9% of residents were 65 years of age or older. For every 100 females there were 100.5 males, and for every 100 females age 18 and over there were 99.9 males.

100.0% of residents lived in urban areas, while 0.0% lived in rural areas.

There were 1,168 households in Crosby, of which 44.2% had children under the age of 18 living in them. Of all households, 47.5% were married-couple households, 19.2% were households with a male householder and no spouse or partner present, and 26.7% were households with a female householder and no spouse or partner present. About 20.1% of all households were made up of individuals and 7.2% had someone living alone who was 65 years of age or older.

There were 1,268 housing units, of which 7.9% were vacant. The homeowner vacancy rate was 2.6% and the rental vacancy rate was 10.7%.

=== 2010 census ===
As of the 2010 census, 2,299 people lived there.

=== 2000 census ===
As of the 2000 census, 1,713 people, 662 households, and 464 families resided in the CDP. The population density was 758.2 people per square mile (292.8/km,^{2}). The 743 housing units had an average density of 328.7 per square mile (126.9/km^{2}). The racial makeup of the CDP was 74.15% White, 12.72% African American, 0.76% Native American, 0.41% Asian, 10.79% from other races, and 1.17% from two or more races. Hispanics or Latinos of any race were 18.38% of the population.

Of the 662 households, 35.4% had children under 18 living with them, 49.4% were married couples living together, 15.8% had a female householder with no husband present, and 30.3% were not families. About 26.1% of all households were made up of individuals, and 11.1% had someone living alone who was 65 or older. The average household size was 2.57 and the average family size was 3.09.

In the CDP, the age distribution was 28.2% under 18, 10.1% from 18 to 24, 29.1% from 25 to 44, 19.8% from 45 to 64, and 12.8% who were 65 or older. The median age was 32 years. For every 100 females, there were 100 males. For every 100 females 18 and over, there were 96.2 males.

The median income for a household in the CDP was $35,508, and for a family was $41,458. Males had a median income of $37,244 versus $25,500 for females. The per capita income for the CDP was $14,851. About 9.2% of families and 13.4% of the population were below the poverty line, including 16.7% of those under 18 and 20.1% of those 65 or over.

== Government and infrastructure ==
The community is within Harris County Commissioner's Court Precinct 3. As of 2026, Commissioner Tom Ramsey is the head of the precinct. The precinct operates the Crosby Community Center at 409 Hare Road.

For law enforcement, the community is served by the Harris County Sheriff's Office. and Harris County Constable Precinct 3.

Harris Health System (formerly Harris County Hospital District) designated Baytown Health Center in Baytown for ZIP code 77532. The nearest public hospital is Lyndon B. Johnson General Hospital in northeast Houston.

Harris County Eastgate Cemetery, which started operations in 2014, is a potter's field operated by the county. It is near the CDP and has a Crosby postal address.

== Crosby Volunteer Fire Department ==
Crosby Volunteer Fire Department, funded by Harris County Emergency Services District #80, was formed in 1942. Their official website is crosbyvfd.org. The Crosby Volunteer Fire Department is dedicated to protecting life and property by providing effective public education, fire prevention, and emergency services.

Crosby Volunteer Fire Department protects the unincorporated communities of Crosby and Barrett Station, Texas. The district consists of 102.8 square miles (266 km^{2}) and 30,000 people, about 22 miles (35 km) east-northeast of Houston. The protection area is split into two response districts covered by five stations staffed entirely by volunteers from the community.

== Parks and recreation ==
Crosby Park and Crosby Community Center are located at 419 Hare Road. It is a 46-acre (190,000 m^{2}) facility with two lighted baseball fields, two lighted soccer fields maintained by Crosby Youth Soccer Club, two lighted tennis courts, one basketball pavilion, a playground, a paved trail of 0.726 miles (1.2 km), picnic tables, barbecue grills, a barbecue pavilion, and restrooms.

The Barrett Station/Riley Chambers Community Center is located at 808 Magnolia Ave. Facilities include restrooms, picnic, playground, trails, open shelter, basketball, baseball, riding arena, and football fields.

Crosby Sports Complex is located at 8600 Miller-Wilson Road. It is a facility of 12 acres (49,000 m^{2}) with two lighted softball fields, four lighted baseball fields, picnic tables, and restrooms. Crosby Sports Complex softball fields are maintained by the Crosby Sports Association.

== Education ==
=== Primary and secondary schools ===
==== Public schools ====
Crosby students attend school in the Crosby Independent School District.

Most of the CDP itself is zoned to Crosby Elementary School and Newport Elementary School, while some portions are zoned to Barrett Elementary School.

Public schools serving all of Crosby ISD include Crosby Kindergarten Center, Drew Intermediate, Crosby Middle School, and Crosby High School.

According to the Texas Education Agency AEIS report in 2007–2008, Crosby ISD served 4,855 students in ZIP code 77532; 21% were African American, 22.2% Hispanic, 56.1% White, 0.3% Native American, and 0.4% Asian.

==== Private schools ====
The Crosby International Academy serving K – 12th, the Crosby Christian Academy serving infants – elementary, and Sacred Heart Catholic School are in Crosby.

==== Colleges and universities ====
Residents of Crosby ISD are zoned to Lee College.

== Public libraries ==
Crosby is served by the Crosby Branch of Harris County Public Library, adjacent to and outside of the CDP.

== Notable people ==
- Steven Hobbs - murderer and suspected serial killer, sentenced to life imprisonment for sexually assaulting multiple prostitutes and killing at least two
- David H. McNerney (1931–2010), U.S. Army first sergeant and Medal of Honor recipient for actions during the Vietnam War.

== Media ==
- Star Courier
- The Lake Houston Sentinel
- The Lake Houston Observer

== Transportation ==
Harris County Transit operates public transportation.
