= Huffman Independent School District =

School district in Texas, United States

Address
- 24302 FM 2100 Huffman, Texas, 77336; United States

District information
- Type: Public
- Grades: PK–12
- Schools: 4
- NCES District ID: 4823820

Students and staff
- Students: 3,679 (2023–2024)
- Teachers: 249.27 (on an FTE basis) (2023–2024)
- Staff: 306.43 (on an FTE basis) (2023–2024)
- Student–teacher ratio: 14.76 (2023–2024)

Other information
- Website: www.huffmanisd.net

Huffman Independent School District is a public school district based in Huffman—an unincorporated area of northeastern Harris County, Texas (USA) within the Houston–The Woodlands–Sugar Land metropolitan area.

Huffman ISD serves a small portion of the city of Houston.

In 2009, the school district was rated "recognized" by the Texas Education Agency.

As of 2018 the district had 3,500 students.

On March 4, 2024, the Attorney General of the state of Texas Ken Paxton filed a Lawsuit against Huffman ISD and the Huffman ISD school board members alleging that Huffman ISD Superintendent Dr. Benny Soileau was allowed to commit the crime of electioneering on school grounds. The Attorney General's lawsuit papers were served to board members Amanda McGee, Kirk Vaughn, Ray Burt, Matt Dutton, Dean Warren, Jared Dagley, Jeremy Phillips, and Dr. Benny Soileau on March 7, 2024, at Huffman ISD attorney's Thompson & Horton office and filed in the Harris County Court system on April 2, 2024. The District Attorney of Harris County Kim Ogg picked up the electioneering allegations against Dr. Benny Soileau on March 28, 2024, and opened a criminal investigation. Electioneering in Texas is a class A misdemeanor and is punishable by up to one year in jail and a $4,000 fine.

== Schools ==
Secondary schools:

- Hargrave High School
- Huffman Middle School

Primary schools:

- Huffman Elementary School
- Falcon Ridge Elementary School
  - As of 2018 it had 748 students. It opened in 2018, was designed by Huckabee & Associates, and was built through contractor Paradigm Construction LLC, with the company Bond Program Management Services, used by Huffman ISD to manage its school bond programs, chosen. The following Lawsuits Paradigm Construction vs Huffman ISD (Cause Number 2018-62696), Paradigm Construction vs Tom Trial, Individually and D/B/A Bond Program Management Services, Inc (Cause Number 2018-90553), Argonaut Insurance Company vs Huffman Independent School District (Cause Number 2019-02891) all came out of the construction of Falcon Ridge Elementary. The claims contained in the Lawsuits were:
- Huffman ISD entered into a contract with Tom Trial (BPMS) on June 28, 2016. The Contract the District created paid Tom Trial $150,000 upfront when signing the Contract and then a percentage of the 2016 voter-approved 44,100,1000 dollar Bond. That number came out to be $938,224.87.
- Tom Trial (BPMS) did not have a Federal or Texas State Tax ID number on June 28, 2016. That Tax ID number was not filed until November 15, 2016.
- Texas Government Code 2269.053 and Texas Government Code 2254.027 require a Project Manager in this capacity to have verifiable experience and qualifications. Tom Trial and his company BPMS could not have had any of those since the company was not even in existence until 5 months after signing the contract with Huffman ISD.
- On July 16, 2018, Huffman ISD began supplementing Paradigm Construction on the project without giving proper statutory notice per the contract with Paradigm Construction and the agreement with Argonaut Insurance Company.
- On November 30, 2018, Huffman ISD & Tom Trial BPMS attempted to make a Performance Bond claim for $4,087,772.80. Argonaut Insurance Company statutorily denied that claim and then brought it into the Harris County court system for a Declaratory Judgement. Huffman ISD never responded to the suit and it was dismissed on November 18, 2021.
- Huffman ISD settled the case Paradigm Construction vs Huffman ISD on January 7, 2020, and Paradigm Construction vs Tom Trial D/B/A Bond Performance Management Services, Inc on January 15, 2020, after writing Paradigm Construction checks totaling $6,039,618.07

Former schools:

- Huffman Intermediate School
- Copeland Elementary School
- Ben Bowen Early Childhood Center
