= Harris County Public Library =

Public library system of Harris County, Texas

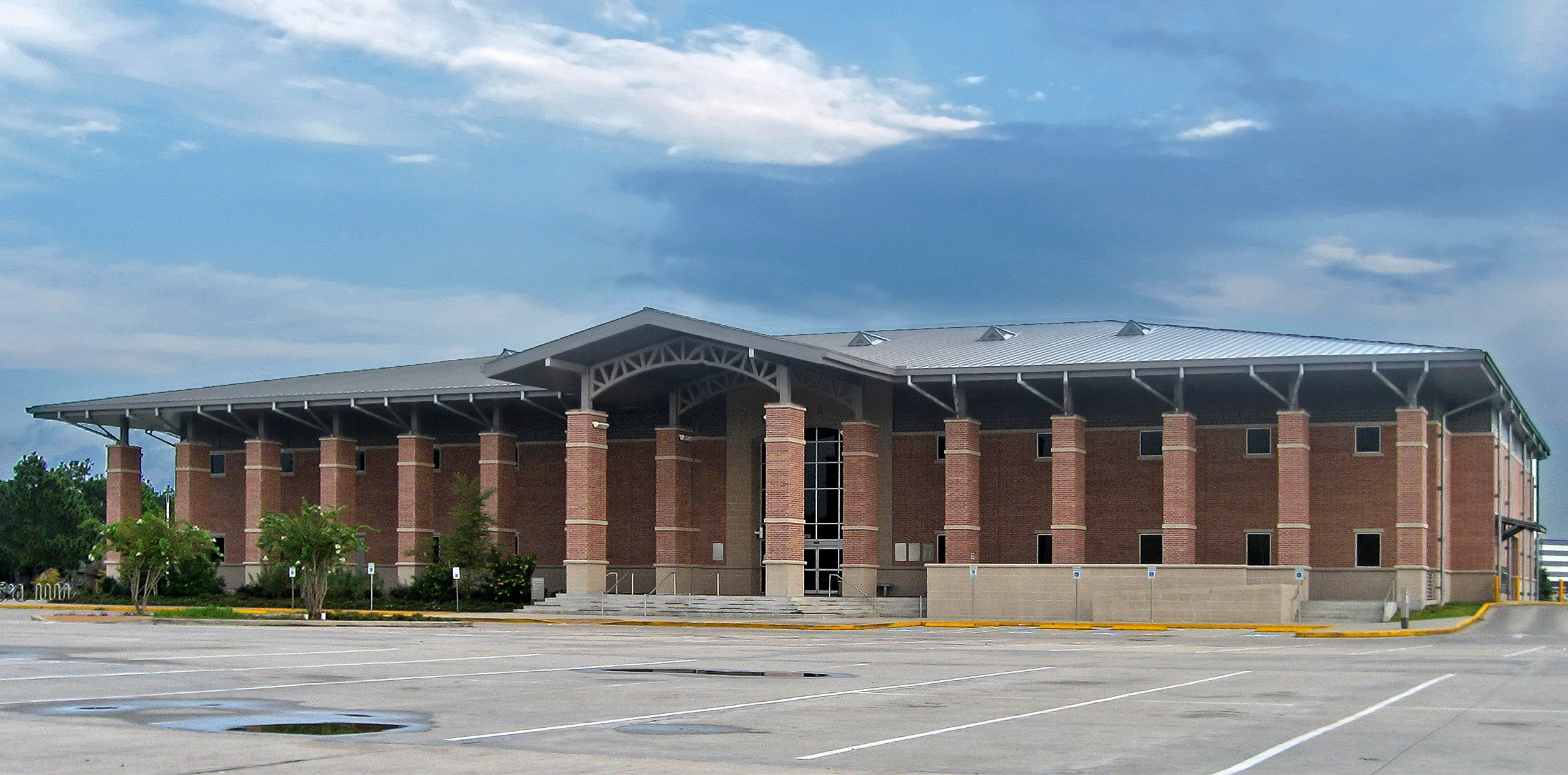
Freeman Public Library in Clear Lake City

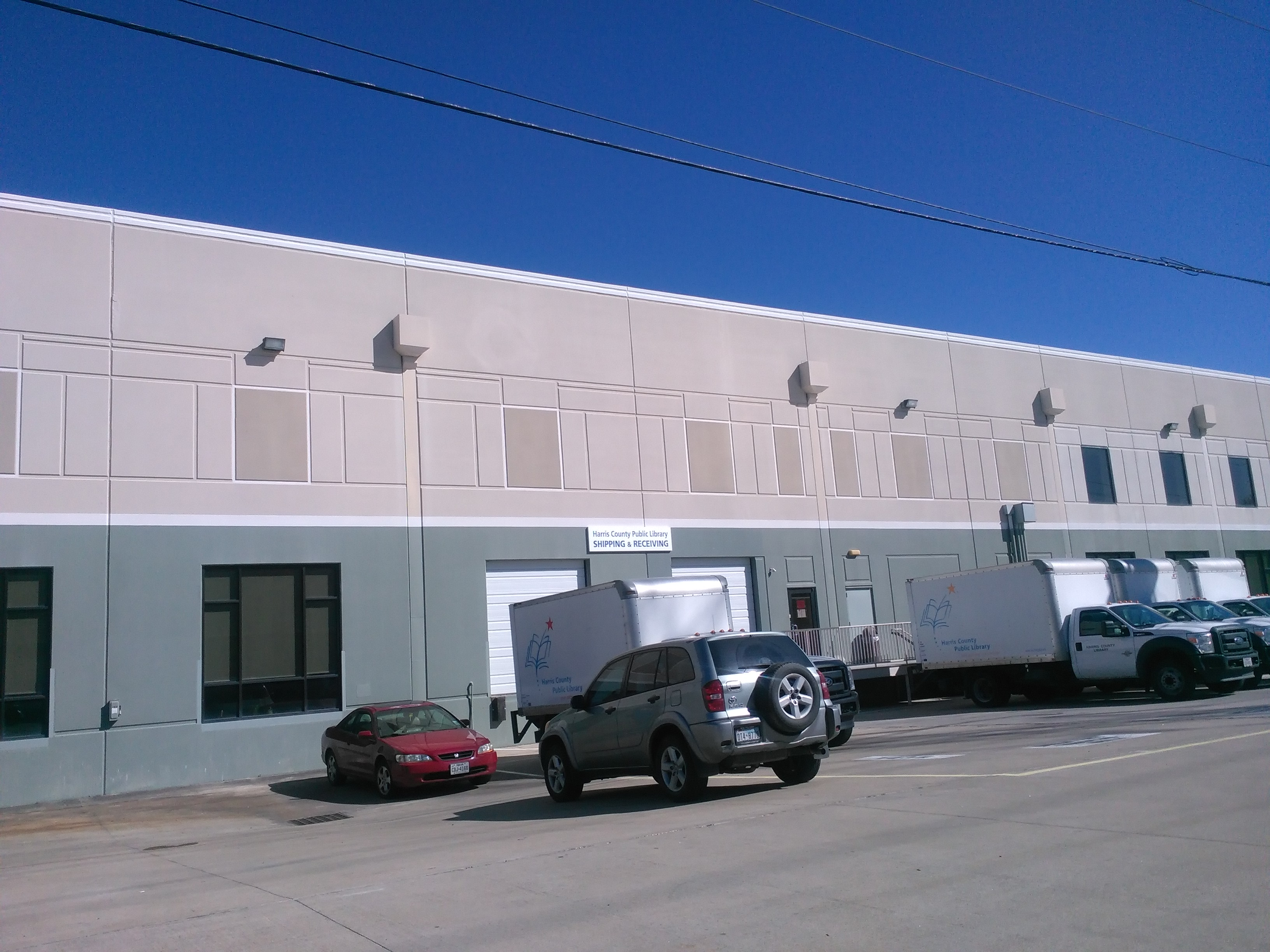
The loading dock of the previous Harris County Public Library headquarters in Houston

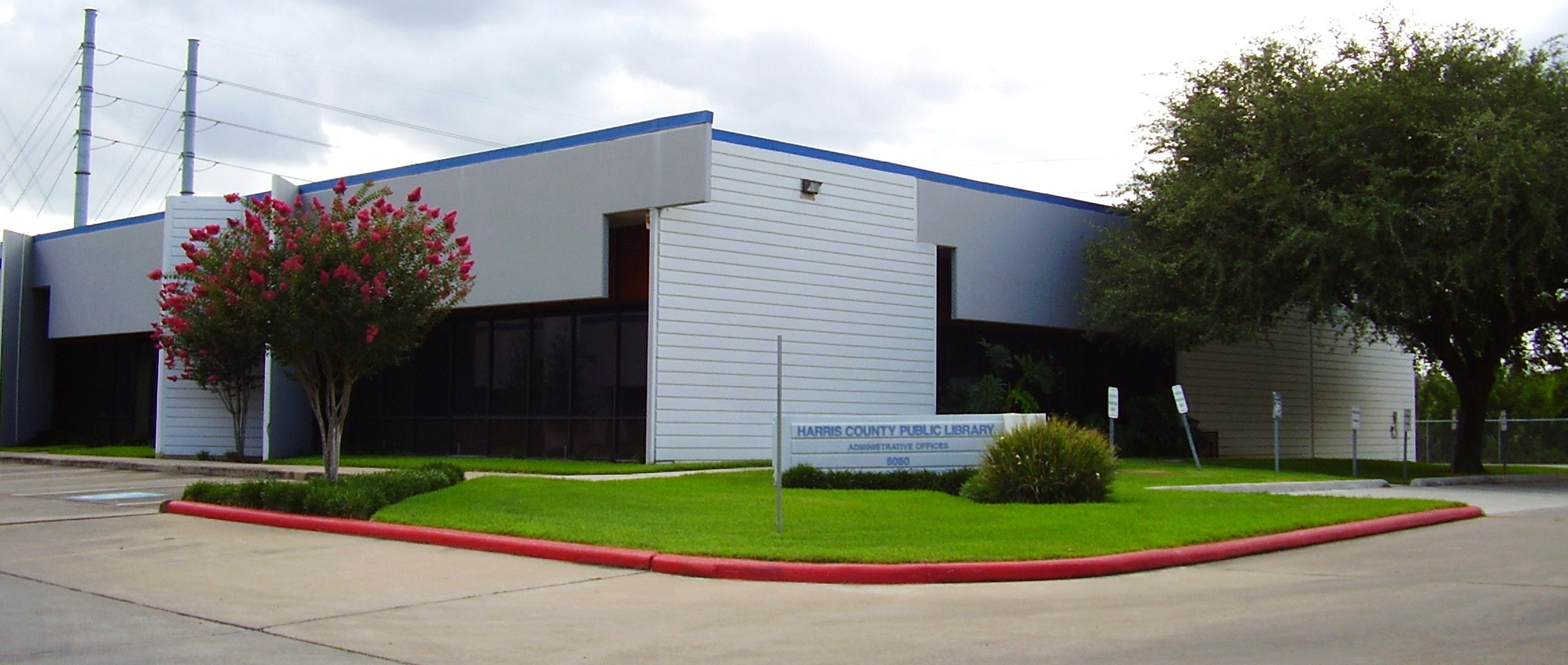
Former Harris County Public Library Administrative Offices in Houston

Harris County Public Library (HCPL) is a public library system serving Harris County, Texas, United States.

Since its inception in 1921, HCPL has grown from a system of small book stations in homes, stores and post offices to 26 branch libraries serving a population of over 1.3 million users in unincorporated areas countywide. HCPL has a collection of over 2.5 million items and circulated over 9.7 million items in fiscal year 2014. Edward Melton is the director of the library system.

HCPL operates branches in several cities which do not have library systems of their own and in unincorporated parts of Harris County. Three branches are located within the city limits of Houston, in sections that have been annexed since the branches opened. Most of Houston itself is served by the Houston Public Library.

== Administration ==
The county library system is headquartered on the property of 5749 South Loop East. It is in a 83,385-square-foot (7,746.7 m^{2}) one story building.

It was formerly headquartered at 8080 El Rio Street. At a later time it was headquartered at 9220 Kirby Drive, within the Corporate Centre Kirby in Houston.

== Branches ==
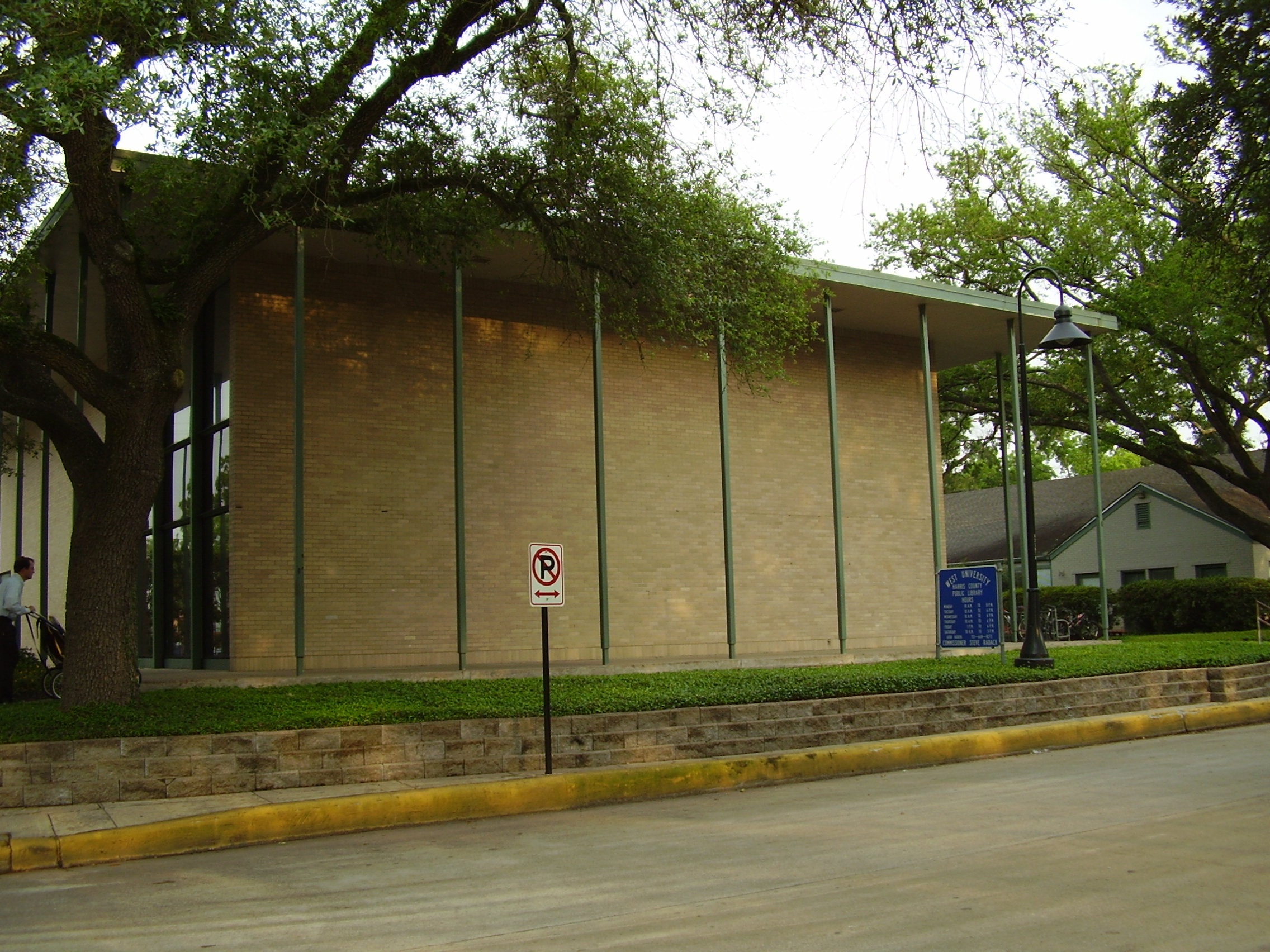
West University Library in West University Place

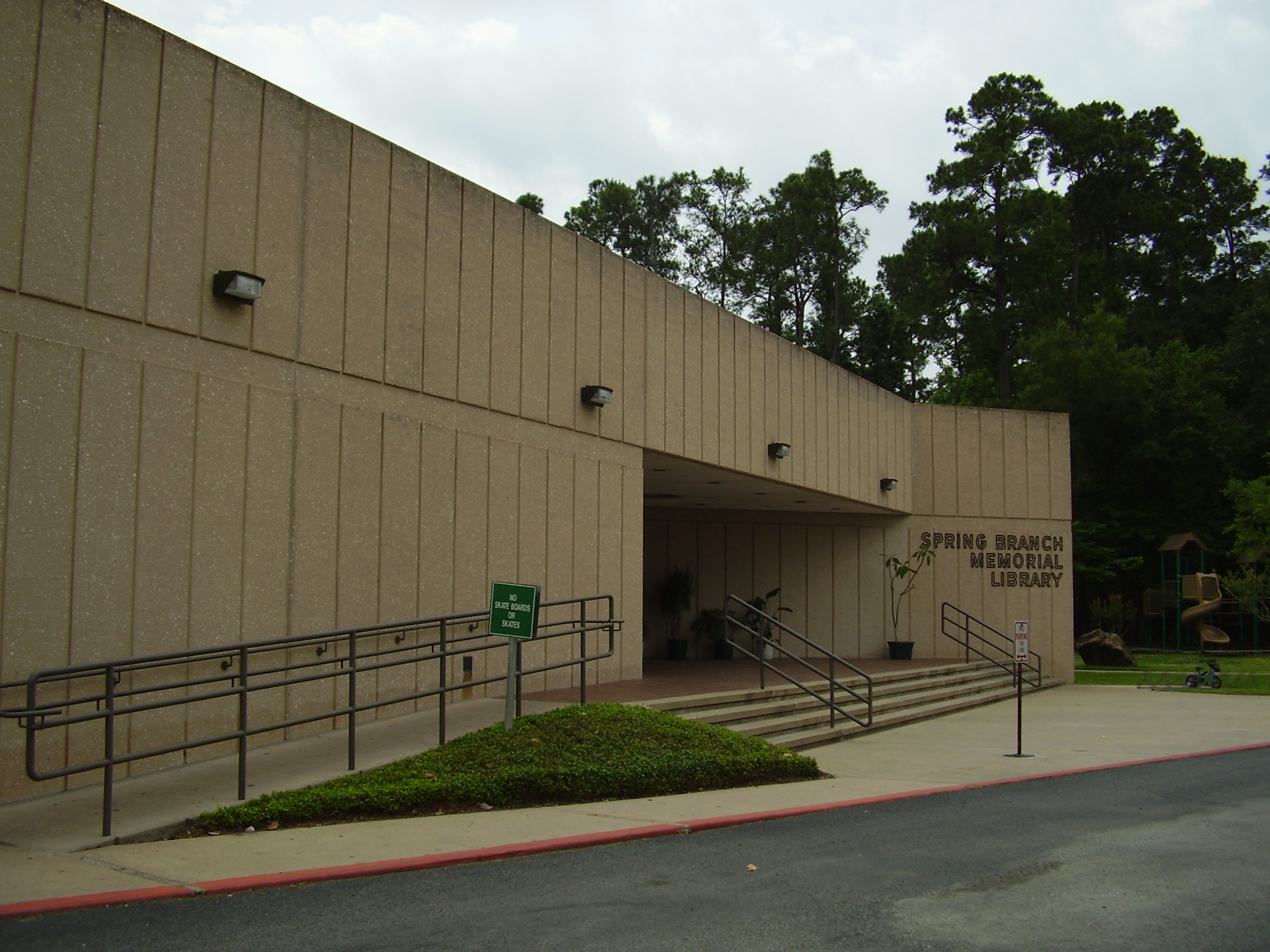
Spring Branch Memorial Library in Hedwig Village

- Aldine Library - Houston
  - The branch serves Greenspoint. An expansion and renovation was scheduled to be completed in January 2001.
- Atascocita Library - Atascocita CDP, unincorporated area
- Baldwin Boettcher Library @ Mercer Park - Unincorporated area
  - Some areas near Humble are served by this branch. It was constructed on donated land. It was named after Baldwin Boettcher, a German settler. His descendants deeded the homestead to Harris County. The plans stated that the Boettcher staff would assist the Mercer Park staff in finding any botanical reference books that they or the public need. This library is closed until further notice due to flood damage during Hurricane Harvey.
- Barbara Bush Library @ Cypress Creek - Unincorporated area
  - The branch serves areas with Spring postal addresses. Construction began in the northern hemisphere summer of 2000, and the library opened on December 18, 2002. The branch flooded during Hurricane Harvey, causing extensive damage and necessitating the library's temporary closure. It reopened in May 2018 after renovations were complete.
- Clear Lake City-County Freeman Branch Library - Houston
  - The branch is a joint project between HCPL and the Houston Public Library
- Crosby Library - Unincorporated area
- LSC Cy-Fair Branch Library (on the Lone Star College–CyFair Campus) - Unincorporated area
  - The branch is a joint project between HCPL and the Lone Star College System.
- Evelyn Meador Library - Seabrook
- Fairbanks Library - Unincorporated Harris County (Houston address)
- Galena Park Library - Galena Park
- High Meadows - Unincorporated Harris County (Houston address)
- Jacinto City Library - Jacinto City
- Katherine Tyra Library @ Bear Creek - Unincorporated Harris County (Houston address)
- Katy Library - Katy
- Kingwood Library - Houston
- La Porte Library - La Porte

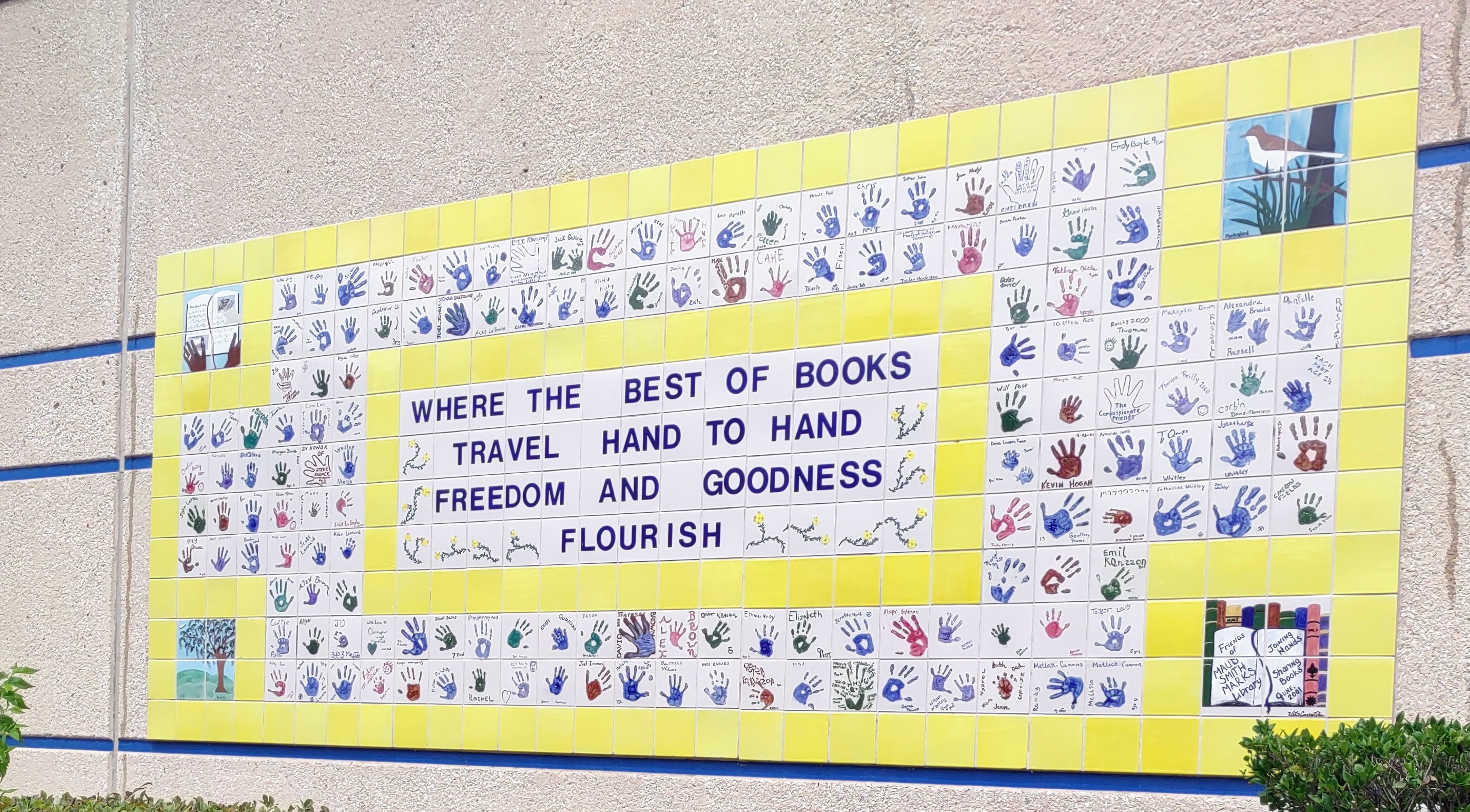
One of two tile murals outside the Maud Smith Marks branch of Harris County Public Library shows handprints from friends of the library

- Maud Smith Marks Library - Unincorporated Harris County (Katy address)
- North Channel Library - Unincorporated Harris County (Houston address)
- Northwest Library - Unincorporated Harris County Cypress, Texas
- Octavia Fields Library - Humble
- Parker Williams Library - Unincorporated Harris County (Houston address)
- South Houston Library - South Houston
- Spring Branch Memorial Library - Hedwig Village (Houston address)
- Stratford Library - Unincorporated Harris County (Highlands address)
- LSC Tomball Branch Library (on the Lone Star College-Tomball Campus) - Tomball
  - The branch is a joint project between HCPL and the Lone Star College System.
- West University Library - West University Place (Houston address)

== Gallery ==
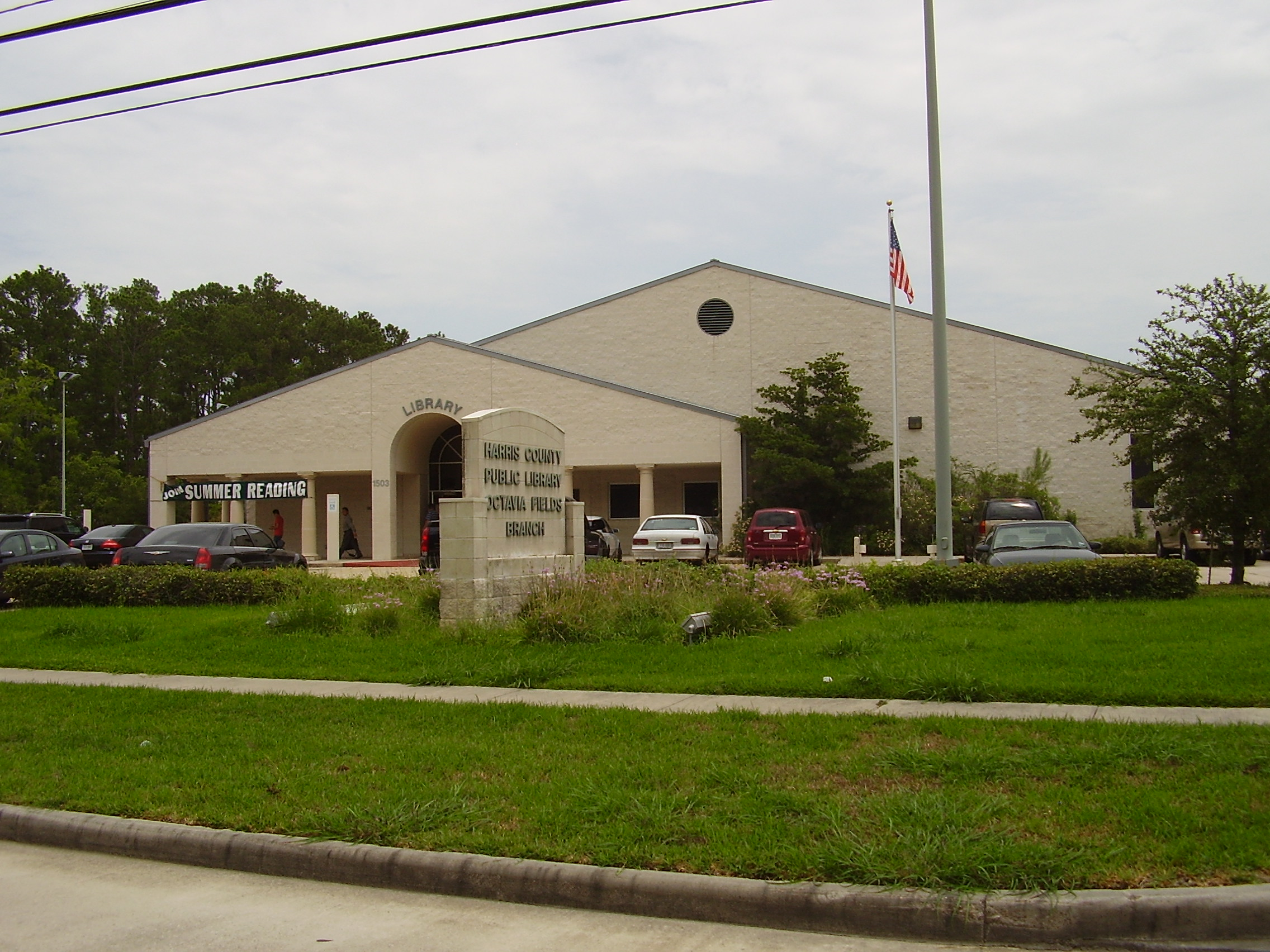
Octavia Fields Library in Humble

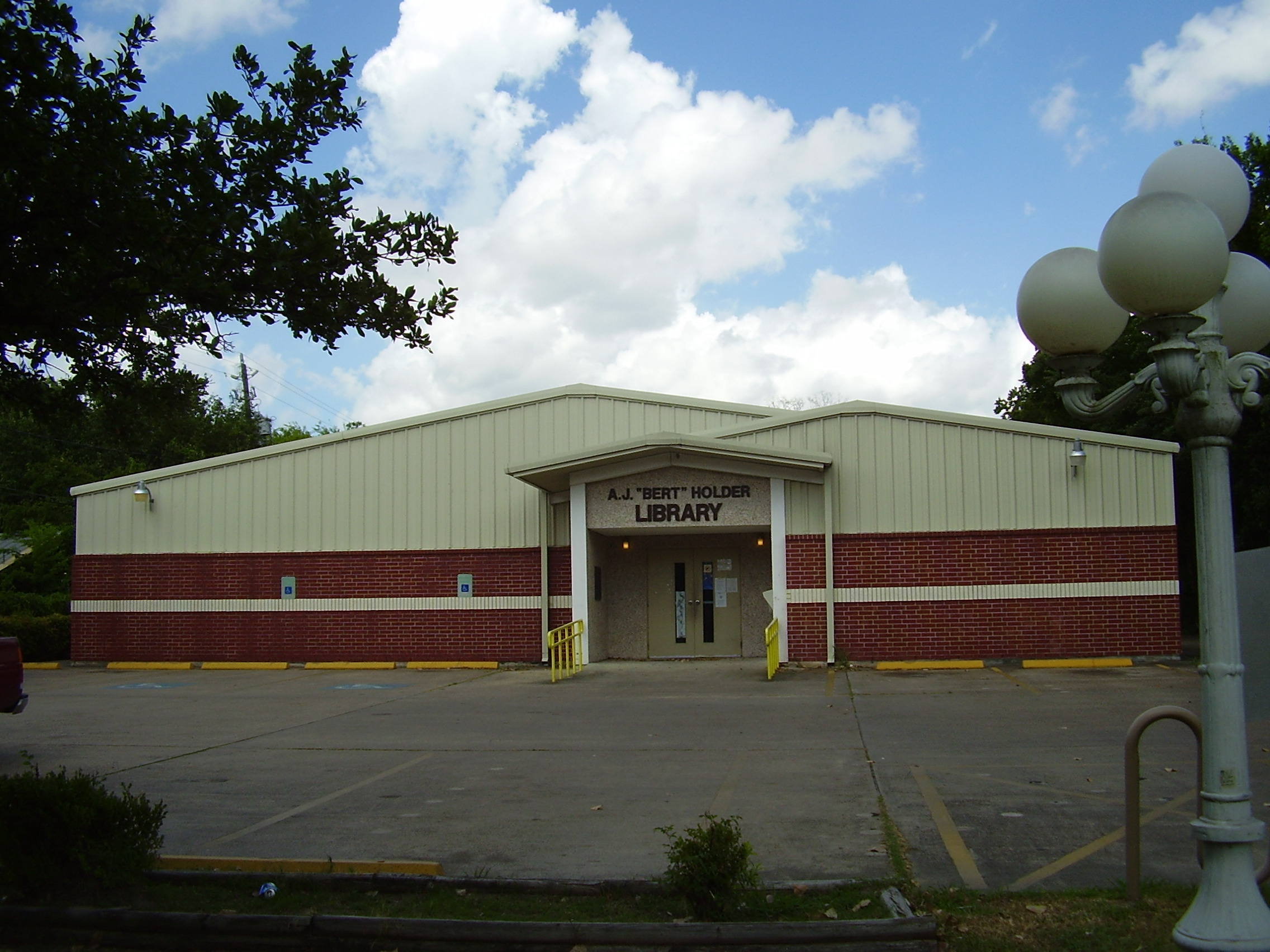
A. J. "Bert" Holder Memorial Library in Jacinto City

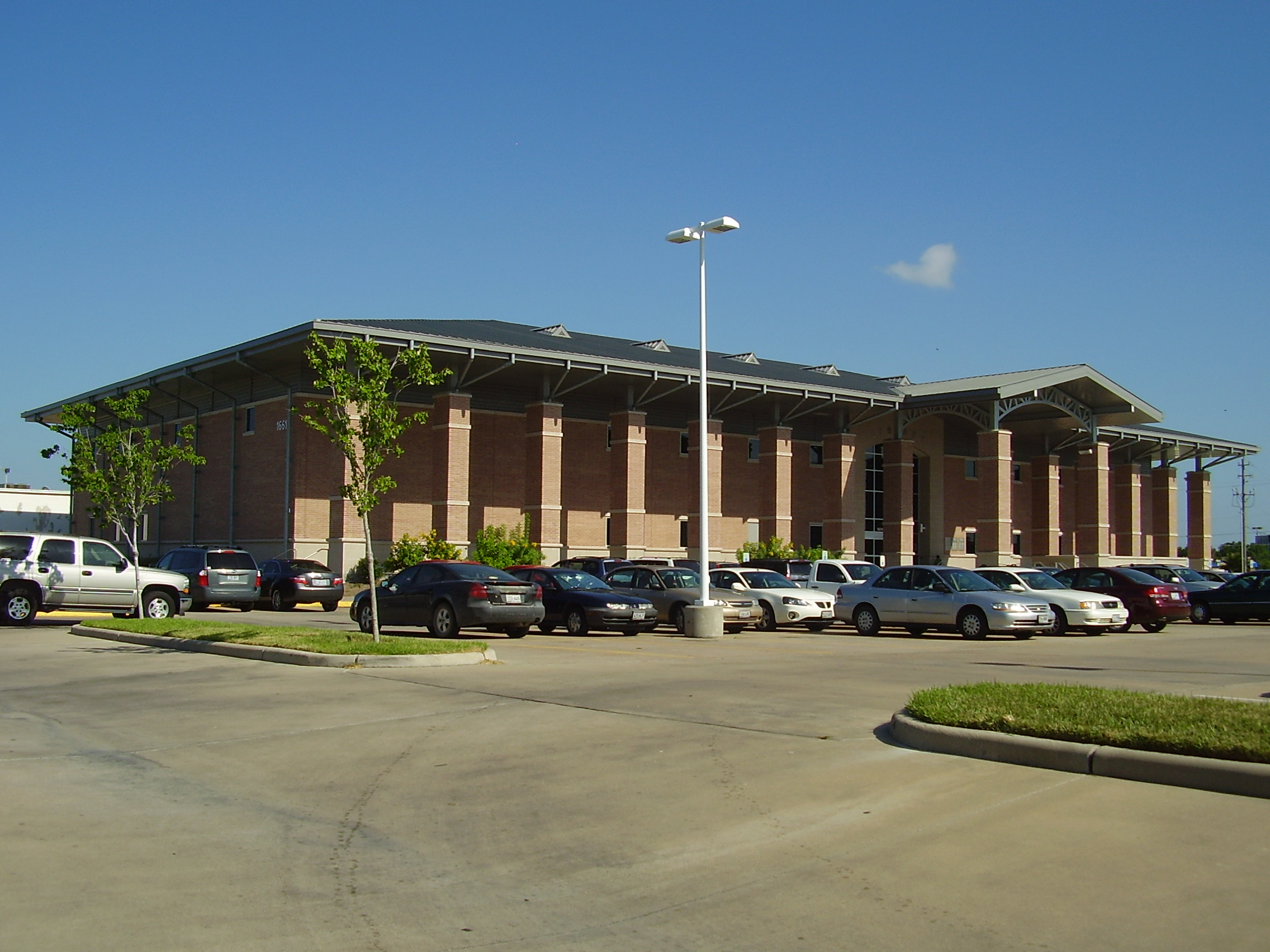
Clear Lake City–County Freeman Branch in Houston

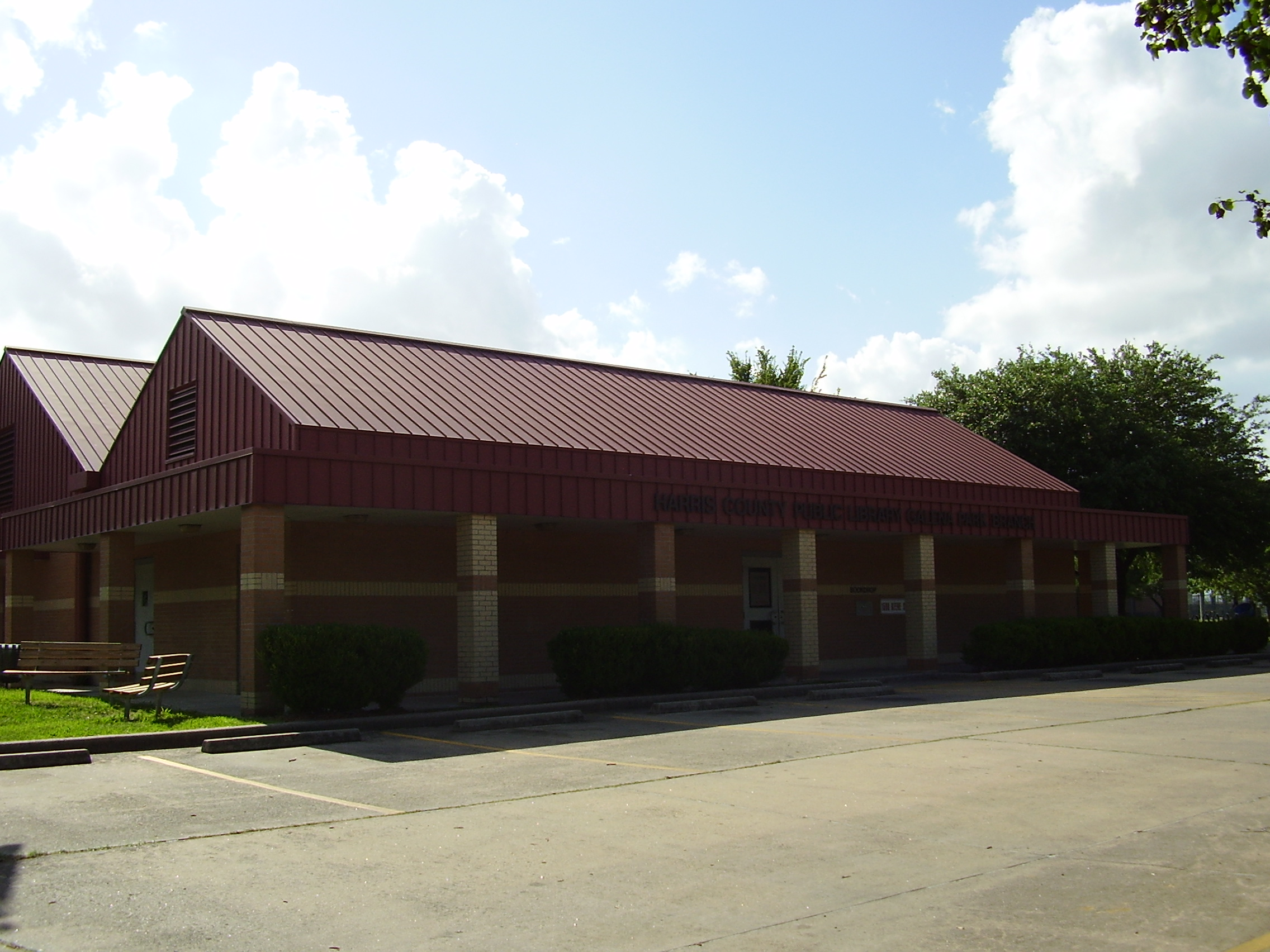
Galena Park Library in Galena Park

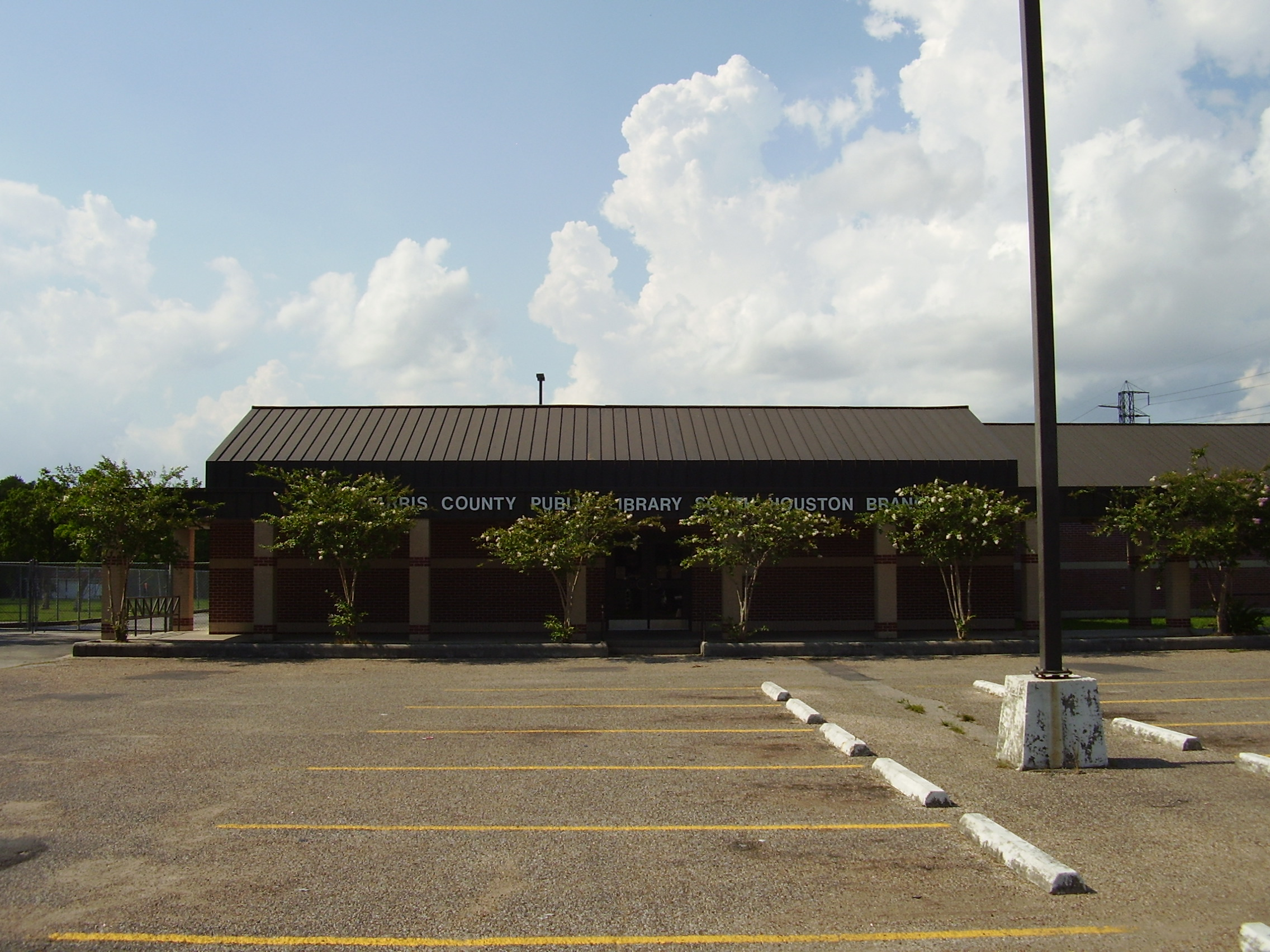
South Houston Library in South Houston

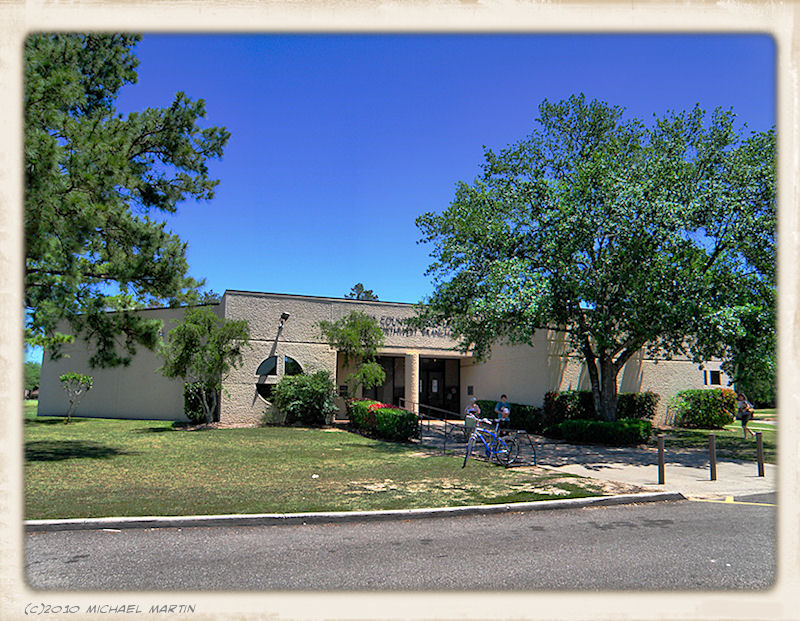
Northwest Library in Cypress
