= Fairbanks, Houston =

Neighborhood of Houston, Texas, United States

Coordinates: 29.8527°N 95.5266°W

Fairbanks is a community along U.S. Highway 290 and the Southern Pacific Railroad in Western Houston, Texas, United States. At one point it was a distinct unincorporated area within Harris County.

== History ==
The community, named after its founder, John Joseph Fairbanks, was founded in July, 1895. In 1895 Fairbanks received its first post office. In 1914 Fairbanks had 75 residents, a general store and saloon, and a grocery store. The community had 25 people in the 1920s and 1930s. In 1942 the community had 800 residents and 35 businesses in the area. In the 1950s the population decreased to 350 people. Houston annexed Fairbanks in 1956. The community began to expand around that period; in the 1960s the Fairbanks area and some surrounding communities had 1,050 residents and 45 businesses. In 1980 and 1990 1,050 people lived in Fairbanks, while more people lived in the surrounding area.

== Government and infrastructure ==
=== Local government ===
Houston City Council District A serves Fairbanks. As of 2020 the district is represented by Amy Peck.

The Fairbanks area is served by the Houston Police Department Northwest Patrol Division, headquartered at 6000 Teague Road.

=== County, state, and federal representation ===
Fairbanks is within Harris County Precinct 4. As of 2008 Jerry Eversole heads the precinct.

Fairbanks is located in District 135 of the Texas House of Representatives. As of 2019, Jon Rosenthal represents the district. Fairbanks is within District 7 of the Texas Senate; as of 2015 Paul Bettencourt represents the district.

Fairbanks is in Texas's 7th congressional district. As of 2019, Lizzie Fletcher represents the district. The United States Postal Service operates the Fairbanks Post Office at 7050 Brookhollow West Drive in an unincorporated area.

== Education ==
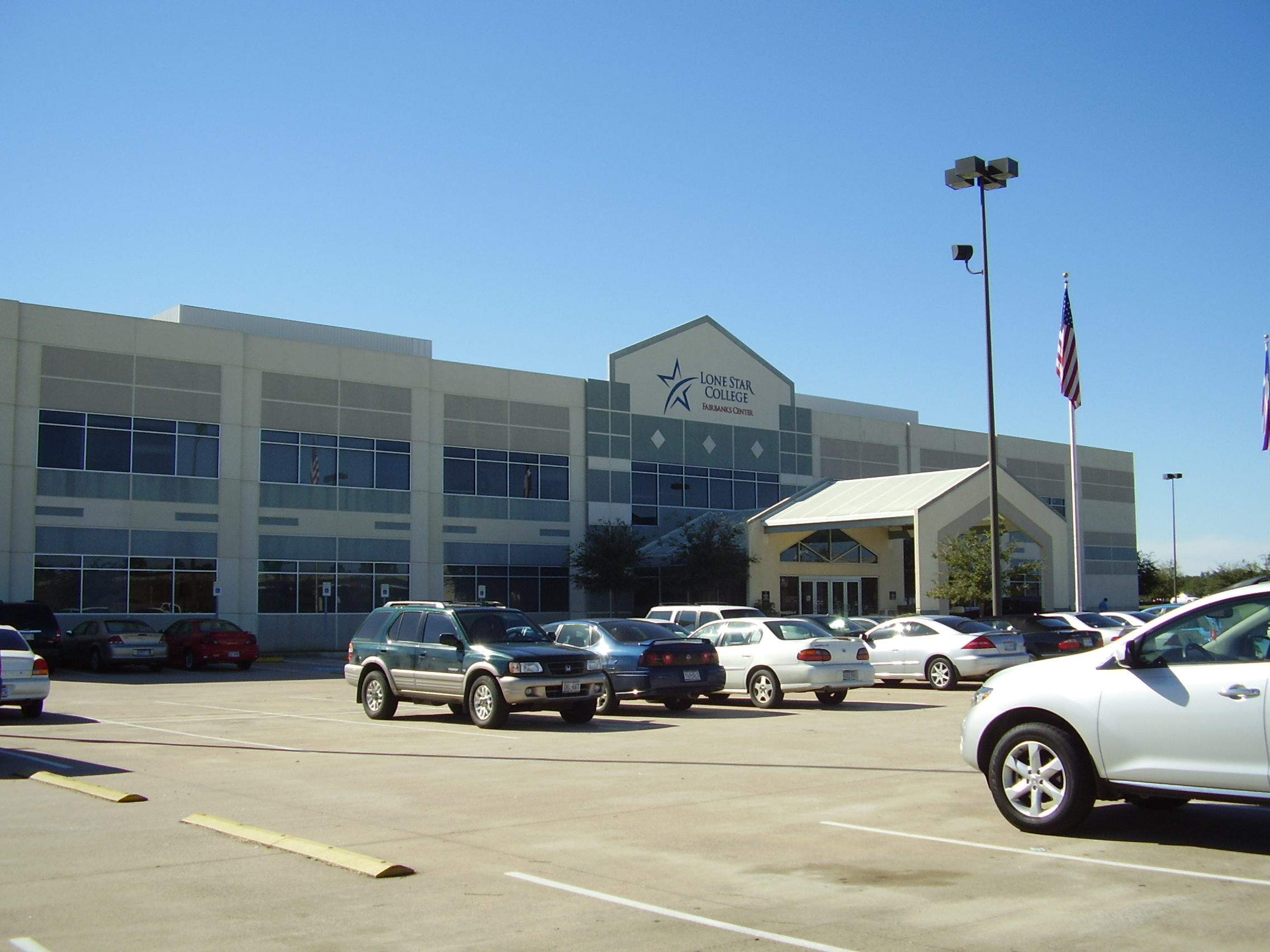
Lone Star College Fairbanks Center

Fairbanks is within the Cypress-Fairbanks Independent School District.

Until the 1930s the Fairbanks School District operated (present day) Bane Elementary and the Fairbanks High School (Later called Carverdale High School). Until the 1960s, Carverdale High School, under Cy-Fair I.S.D., operated as the African-American School during segregation in the American South. The Carverdale High School in later years was used by the Houston Community College System as its Carverdale Campus.

Lone Star College (originally the North Harris Montgomery Community College District) serves the community. The territory in Cypress-Fairbanks ISD joined the community college district in 2000. The system operates the Fairbanks Center in unincorporated Harris County; Fairbanks Center is a part of Lone Star College–CyFair.

Harris County Public Library operates the Fairbanks Branch Library at 7122 North Gessner Drive in an unincorporated area. The branch opened in 1970. Originally at 5,000 square feet (460 m^{2}), it received an expansion in 1990, making it 7,247 square feet (673.3 m^{2}).

Cypress Ridge High School is a high school located at 7900 North Eldridge Parkway. The school opened in 2002 and currently holds 3000+ students.

== See also ==
["https://web.archive.org/web/20120415142730/http://www.cfisd.net/movies/zmovies/carverdale.htm" | History of Carverdale and Fairbanks (Video by Cy-Fair ISD)]

- List of Houston neighborhoods
