= Montgomery Community College =

The term Montgomery Community College may refer to:

- Montgomery College, a two-year college in Rockville, Takoma Park/Silver Spring, and Germantown, Maryland
- Fulton-Montgomery Community College, a two-year college in Johnstown, New York
- Montgomery Community College (North Carolina), a two-year college in Troy, North Carolina
- Montgomery County Community College, a two-year college in Montgomery County, Pennsylvania
- Lone Star College–Montgomery, formerly known as Montgomery College, a two-year college between the towns of Conroe and The Woodlands in Montgomery County, Texas
- North Harris Montgomery Community College District, a system of two-year colleges near Houston, Texas.
