= Plum Grove, Texas =

- City
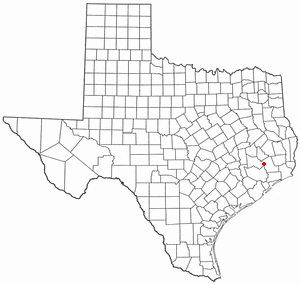
- Location of Plum Grove, Texas

- Coordinates: 30°12′55″N 95°5′43″W
- Country: United States
- State: Texas
- County: Liberty

Government
  - Type: Council / Manager

Area
  - Total: 3.75 sq mi (9.71 km^{2})
  - Land: 3.75 sq mi (9.71 km^{2})
  - Water: 0 sq mi (0.00 km^{2})
- Elevation: 95 ft (29 m)

Population (2020)
  - Total: 1,245
  - Estimate (2025): 1,677
  - Density: 160/sq mi (61.8/km^{2})
- Time zone: UTC-6 (Central (CST))
  - Summer (DST): UTC-5 (CDT)
- ZIP code: 77327
- Area code: 281
- FIPS code: 48-58448
- GNIS feature ID: 2411444
- Website: cityofplumgrovetexas.com

Plum Grove is a city in Liberty County, Texas, United States. The population was 1,245 at the 2020 census.

== History ==
In 2015, residents of Plum Grove addressed the Liberty County Commissioners Court, stating concerns with the expansion of Colony Ridge.

== Geography ==
According to the United States Census Bureau, the city has a total area of 7.3 square miles (19 km^{2}), all land.

== Demographics ==
Historical population
| Census | Pop. | Note | %± |
|---|---|---|---|
| 1980 | 455 | | — |
| 1990 | 480 | | 5.5% |
| 2000 | 930 | | 93.8% |
| 2010 | 600 | | −35.5% |
| 2020 | 1,245 | | 107.5% |
| 2025 (est.) | 1,677 | | 34.7% |
U.S. Decennial Census; 1850–1900 1910; 1920 1930 1940; 1950 1960 1970; 1980 1990 2000; 2010

=== 2020 census ===
As of the 2020 census, Plum Grove had a population of 1,245 and a median age of 28.7 years. 33.7% of residents were under the age of 18 while 6.2% of residents were 65 years of age or older. For every 100 females there were 101.8 males, and for every 100 females age 18 and over there were 101.5 males age 18 and over.

In the 2020 census, amidst a large influx of mostly Hispanic residents from elsewhere in Greater Houston, the population doubled from 600 in 2010 to 1,245 in 2020.

0.0% of residents lived in urban areas, while 100.0% lived in rural areas.

There were 351 households in Plum Grove, of which 53.6% had children under the age of 18 living in them. Of all households, 59.8% were married-couple households, 13.7% were households with a male householder and no spouse or partner present, and 17.7% were households with a female householder and no spouse or partner present. About 12.5% of all households were made up of individuals and 3.2% had someone living alone who was 65 years of age or older.

There were 405 housing units, of which 13.3% were vacant. The homeowner vacancy rate was 2.9% and the rental vacancy rate was 9.7%.

Racial composition as of the 2020 census
| Race | Number | Percent |
|---|---|---|
| White | 509 | 40.9% |
| Black or African American | 12 | 1.0% |
| American Indian and Alaska Native | 28 | 2.2% |
| Asian | 1 | 0.1% |
| Native Hawaiian and Other Pacific Islander | 0 | 0.0% |
| Some other race | 423 | 34.0% |
| Two or more races | 272 | 21.8% |
| Hispanic or Latino (of any race) | 872 | 70.0% |

Latino Americans now made up 70.0% of the resident population.

=== 2000 census ===
As of the 2000 census, there were 930 people, 284 households, and 230 families residing in the city. The population density was 127.2 inhabitants per square mile (49.1/km^{2}). There were 314 housing units at an average density of 42.9 per square mile (16.6/km^{2}). The racial makeup of the city was 91.29% White, 0.75% African American, 0.32% Native American, 0.22% Asian, 5.38% from other races, and 2.04% from two or more races. Hispanic or Latino of any race were 8.60% of the population.

There were 284 households, out of which 50.4% had children under the age of 18 living with them, 69.0% were married couples living together, 6.0% had a female householder with no husband present, and 18.7% were non-families. 15.8% of all households were made up of individuals, and 4.2% had someone living alone who was 65 years of age or older. The average household size was 3.27 and the average family size was 3.65.

In the city, the population was spread out, with 36.1% under the age of 18, 9.7% from 18 to 24, 33.2% from 25 to 44, 16.8% from 45 to 64, and 4.2% who were 65 years of age or older. The median age was 28 years. For every 100 females, there were 111.8 males. For every 100 females age 18 and over, there were 104.8 males.

The median income for a household in the city was $42,232, and the median income for a family was $44,792. Males had a median income of $38,182 versus $21,250 for females. The per capita income for the city was $12,917. About 10.8% of families and 12.7% of the population were below the poverty line, including 14.4% of those under age 18 and 5.9% of those age 65 or over.

== Education ==
Plum Grove is served by the Cleveland Independent School District.

As of 2023, Cleveland High School was the sole comprehensive high school of Cleveland ISD.

Residents of Cleveland ISD are zoned to Lone Star College.
