= North Cleveland, Texas =

- Community
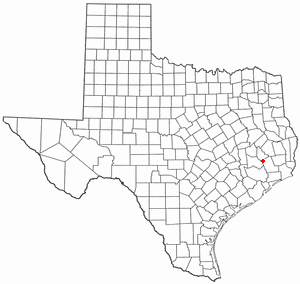
- Location of North Cleveland, Texas

- Coordinates: 30°21′27″N 95°06′01″W
- Country: United States
- State: Texas
- County: Liberty

Area
  - Total: 1.93 sq mi (5.00 km^{2})
  - Land: 1.90 sq mi (4.93 km^{2})
  - Water: 0.027 sq mi (0.07 km^{2})
- Elevation: 131 ft (40 m)

Population (2020)
  - Total: 225
  - Density: 118/sq mi (45.6/km^{2})
- Time zone: UTC-6 (Central (CST))
  - Summer (DST): UTC-5 (CDT)
- ZIP code: 77327
- Area codes: 281/346/713/832
- FIPS code: 48-51984
- GNIS feature ID: 2411272

North Cleveland is a city within the Houston–Pasadena–The Woodlands metropolitan area and Liberty County, Texas, United States. The population was 225 at the 2020 census.

== Geography ==
North Cleveland is located in the northeast corner of Liberty County and is bordered to the east and south by the city of Cleveland, to the north by San Jacinto County and Sam Houston National Forest, and to the west by the East Fork of the San Jacinto River.

Interstate 69/U.S. Route 59, a four-lane freeway, passes through the southeastern corner of North Cleveland as it bypasses the center of Cleveland. I-69/US-59 leads northeast 28 miles (45 km) to Livingston and southwest 45 miles (72 km) to Houston.

According to the United States Census Bureau, North Cleveland has a total area of 1.9 square miles (5.0 km^{2}), of which 0.03 square miles (0.07 km^{2}), or 1.49%, are water. Via the San Jacinto River, the North Cleveland area is part of the watershed of Galveston Bay.

== Demographics ==
Historical population
Census	Pop.	Note	%±
1970	404		—
1980	259		−35.9%
1990	176		−32.0%
2000	263		49.4%
2010	247		−6.1%
2020	225		−8.9%
U.S. Decennial Census; 1850–1900 1910; 1920 1930 1940; 1950 1960 1970; 1980 1990 2000; 2010 2020

=== 2020 census ===
As of the 2020 census, North Cleveland had a population of 225. The median age was 41.5 years. 24.9% of residents were under the age of 18 and 17.3% of residents were 65 years of age or older. For every 100 females there were 97.4 males, and for every 100 females age 18 and over there were 77.9 males age 18 and over.

38.7% of residents lived in urban areas, while 61.3% lived in rural areas.

There were 86 households in North Cleveland, of which 32.6% had children under the age of 18 living in them. Of all households, 43.0% were married-couple households, 17.4% were households with a male householder and no spouse or partner present, and 34.9% were households with a female householder and no spouse or partner present. About 25.5% of all households were made up of individuals and 11.7% had someone living alone who was 65 years of age or older.

There were 96 housing units, of which 10.4% were vacant. The homeowner vacancy rate was 0.0% and the rental vacancy rate was 13.0%.

Racial composition as of the 2020 census
Race	Number	Percent
White	134	59.6%
Black or African American	0	0.0%
American Indian and Alaska Native	2	0.9%
Asian	0	0.0%
Native Hawaiian and Other Pacific Islander	0	0.0%
Some other race	73	32.4%
Two or more races	16	7.1%
Hispanic or Latino (of any race)	100	44.4%

=== 2010 census ===
As of the 2010 census, North Cleveland had a population of 247. The racial and ethnic composition of the population was 68.4% non-Hispanic white, 1.6% non-Hispanic black, 1.2% non-Hispanic from other races, 3.2% from two or more races and 25.9% Hispanic or Latino.

=== 2000 census ===
As of the 2000 census, there were 263 people, 98 households, and 68 families residing in the city. The population density was 136.8 inhabitants per square mile (52.8/km^{2}). There were 109 housing units at an average density of 56.7 per square mile (21.9/km^{2}). The racial makeup of the city was 77.95% White, 5.70% African American, 0.38% Native American, 9.89% from other races, and 6.08% from two or more races. Hispanic or Latino of any race were 26.62% of the population.

There were 98 households, out of which 26.5% had children under the age of 18 living with them, 55.1% were married couples living together, 9.2% had a female householder with no husband present, and 29.6% were non-families. 24.5% of all households were made up of individuals, and 12.2% had someone living alone who was 65 years of age or older. The average household size was 2.68 and the average family size was 3.23.

In the city, the population was spread out, with 22.4% under the age of 18, 10.6% from 18 to 24, 24.3% from 25 to 44, 20.5% from 45 to 64, and 22.1% who were 65 years of age or older. The median age was 41 years. For every 100 females, there were 112.1 males. For every 100 females age 18 and over, there were 104.0 males.

The median income for a household in the city was $29,375, and the median income for a family was $41,250. Males had a median income of $21,250 versus $27,813 for females. The per capita income for the city was $14,216. About 13.6% of families and 16.8% of the population were below the poverty line, including 22.6% of those under the age of eighteen and 15.3% of those 65 or over.

== Education ==
North Cleveland is served by the Cleveland Independent School District.

As of 2023 Cleveland High School is the sole comprehensive high school of Cleveland ISD.

Residents of Cleveland ISD are zoned to Lone Star College.
