= Colony Ridge, Texas =

Subdivisions in Texas

Coordinates: 30°09′01″N 95°12′08″W

Colony Ridge is a collection of subdivisions in unincorporated Liberty County, Texas, United States. It is approximately 30 miles (48 km) northeast of Downtown Houston.

The Colony Ridge subdivisions have been developed by Colony Ridge, LLC, led by brothers John Harris and William Trey Harris. They advertise mainly in Spanish to the Hispanic market through using the names Terrenos Houston (Houston Terrains), Terrenos Santa Fe (Santa Fe Terrains), Santa Fe, Terrenos Parkway 99 (Parkway 99 Terrains), and Lotes y Ranchos (Lots and Ranches) among others.

Colony Ridge has been accused of using predatory lending practices to Hispanic migrants to buy land in their developments by the Department of Justice and the Consumer Financial Protection Bureau stating "bait-and-switch sales and predatory financing."

U.S. Attorney Alamdar S. Hamdani for the Southern District of Texas said, “As alleged in the complaint, Colony Ridge’s exploitative practice began with misleading advertising on platforms like TikTok and often ended with families facing economic ruin, no home and shattered dreams."

On March 14, 2024, Texas Attorney General Ken Paxton sued Colony Ridge and its owner, John Harris, for "have built a sprawling community northeast of Houston on a foundation of false, misleading, and deceptive sales, marketing, and lending practices. Colony Ridge’s business model is predicated on churning land purchasers through a foreclosure mill."

== History ==
Colony Ridge began operations in 2011 and uses several company names to market to the Hispanic community. Terrenos Houston (Houston Terrains) & Terrenos Santa Fe (Santa Fe Terrains) are its most popular brand names; however, they also advertise in social media with names such as Lotes y Ranchos (Lots and Ranches) among others. Brothers John and Trey Harris, and Kevin Harris, the cousin of John and Trey, own the company.

The regulatory oversight over construction was relatively small, as purchasers were not required to have Social Security numbers or credit scores, and according to Molly Hennessy-Fiske of the Washington Post, land was inexpensive; these factors caused the journalist to characterize the development as having "hallmarks of the oft-cited Texas Miracle". The lack of requiring Social Security allowed people who did not legally immigrate to the United States to acquire property. In the State of Texas, and under federal law, people without United States citizenship may legally purchase land. Forrest Wilder of Texas Monthly stated that those attributes caused it to be "one of the fastest-growing parts of Texas".

In 2015, residents of Plum Grove addressed the Liberty County Commissioners Court stating concerns with the expansion of Colony Ridge.

In 2023, about 40,000 people lived there. In October 2023, Hennessy-Fiske characterized the community as having politically conservative views.

Various groups associated with the U.S. conservatism began criticizing Colony Ridge and circulating conspiracy theories as a result of an event, a murder of one male adult, one male child, and three female adults in San Jacinto County in May 2023. Center for Immigration Studies criticized the development, calling it "a warning to America about the coming consequences of an unfettered mass migration." Beginning in the summer of 2023, politicians of the Republican Party of Texas began criticizing the development. Media outlets related to the Republican Party accused the development of allowing drug cartels to establish control and deliberately trying to house people doing illegal immigration. The Associated Press stated that Governor of Texas Greg Abbott and Governor of Florida Ron DeSantis had "traction" with those accusations, and that "There is no evidence to support the claims, and residents, local officials and the developer dispute the portrayals." Wilder argued that the anti-Colony Ridge statements were a "Fact-Challenged Freak-out". Prior to the controversy, Trey Harris had given a campaign for governor by Abbott $1,000,000. J. David Goodman of The New York Times wrote that the controversy over Colony Ridge caused divisions in the Texas GOP, stating there were internal differences between "those who focus on business freedom, and others determined to control the border." Dan Patrick, the Lieutenant Governor of Texas, stated that he would start an investigation into Colony Ridge. In October of that year, Abbott stated that the Texas Legislature should open an investigation into Colony Ridge.

In October 2023 Steven P. Mach, the chairperson of the Texas Public Safety Commission, stated that Colony Ridge "doesn't look a whole lot different than any other rural community, except for the concentration of people. The notion that it’s this lawless, no-go zone is simply inaccurate." Benjamin Wermund of the Houston Chronicle stated that statements by Mach and several employees of the Texas Department of Public Safety (TXDPS) contradicted Abbott's statements about Colony Ridge.

In December 2023 the United States Department of Justice filed a lawsuit against the companies that are developing it, stating that they used techniques that had buyers take out loans, then lose their houses due to lack of payment, as a scheme of selling the property multiple times.

In May 2026, the owners of Colony Ridge filed a defamation suit against Alex Jones, an American right-wing media personality and conspiracy theorist, and Pete Chambers, who campaigned unsuccessfully to be the Republican candidate in the 2026 Texas gubernatorial election. The lawsuit seeks over $10 million in damages and centers on comments Jones and Chambers made during a February broadcast which allegedly "branded [Colony Ridge] a ‘mortgage scam,' a ‘giant fraud site,' and a ‘Sanctuary City' controlled by Mexican drug cartels," according to court filings. The lawsuit says that Jones took down the comments from the social network X after they had been viewed over 650,000 times, but that the comments were still circulating elsewhere online, and that "At no point have [Jones nor Chambers] offered any correction, clarification, or retraction of their lies about Colony Ridge."

== Demographics ==
According to local law enforcement and the developers, a majority of residents are undocumented immigrants, with most of the other residents being United States-born citizens of Latin American origins.

== Law enforcement and crime ==
The Liberty County Sheriff's Department has jurisdiction over Colony Ridge. In October 2023, TXDPS assisted the sheriff's department due to the rapid population increase. Steve McCraw, the head of TXDPS, stated that the law enforcement issues in Colony Ridge are similar to those in other parts of Texas and are not unusually pronounced. Issues include people without driving licenses crashing cars and men in street gangs. According to McCraw, "The Mexican cartels aren't really operating command and control networks in Liberty County." In October 2023, Jeremy Wallace and Jhair Romero stated "Several who spoke to Hearst Newspapers this week said crime is rarely a concern in [Colony Ridge] [...] and that they had no idea their community had become the target of such anti-immigrant theories."

== Geography ==
In regards to some Republicans calling Colony Ridge a "colonia", Wilder stated that the area was characterized by mobile homes common in rural areas throughout East Texas and not by actual characteristics of colonias, which are on the Mexico-United States border. Wilder also stated that many houses that appeared in poor condition were actively being improved and that "Casual visitors can easily misinterpret Colony Ridge".

== Education ==
Colony Ridge is in the Cleveland Independent School District. Cleveland ISD schools in Colony Ridge include Pine Burr Elementary School, Cottonwood Elementary School, Santa Fe Elementary School, and Santa Fe Middle School. In 2023, the Associated Press reported that as Colony Ridge expanded, the district faced capacity issues and that it "has struggled to create enough space." It has plans to build a new high school in Colony Ridge. As of 2023 Cleveland High School is the sole comprehensive public high school of Cleveland ISD.

There is a charter K-8 school, International Leadership of Texas BG Ramirez School. In 2023, the school and one other charter school in Colony Ridge had a combined enrollment of 2,300. It is operated by the charter school organization ILTexas. The other charter school is MSG Ramirez K-8 campus, with ILTexas Liberty High School scheduled to begin operations in 2025.

Residents of Cleveland ISD are zoned to Lone Star College.
