= Richards/Carlberg =

Carlberg
- Formerly: Richards/Carlberg; Rives Carlberg; Smith, Baldwin & Carlberg
- Industry: Advertising
- Founded: 1971; 54 years ago
- Headquarters: Houston, Texas, United States

Carlberg is an American advertising agency Based in Houston, Texas.

Founded in 1971, Carlberg's services include marketing, advertising, branding, media planning and buying, etc.

Previous names include Richards/Carlberg as well as Rives Carlberg and Smith, Smith, Baldwin & Carlberg.
