= Cleveland Independent School District =

School district in Texas, United States

Address
- 316 East Dallas Street Cleveland, Texas, 77327; United States

District information
- Type: Public
- Grades: PK–12
- Schools: 11
- NCES District ID: 4814370

Students and staff
- Students: 11,970 (2023–2024)
- Teachers: 806.89 (on an FTE basis) (2023–2024)
- Staff: 1,093.88 (on an FTE basis) (2023–2024)
- Student–teacher ratio: 14.83 (2023–2024)

Other information
- Website: www.clevelandisd.org

Cleveland Independent School District is a public school district based in Cleveland, Texas (USA).

Within Liberty County, in addition to the majority of Cleveland in that county, the district serves the cities of North Cleveland and Plum Grove, as well as the Colony Ridge development. It also includes portions of Montgomery County, including some sections of Cleveland in that county, and San Jacinto County.

In 2009, the school district was rated "academically acceptable" by the Texas Education Agency.

== History ==
From circa 2020 to 2023, the size of the student body increased by around 200%.

In 2023 the Associated Press reported that as Colony Ridge expanded, the district faced capacity issues and that it "has struggled to create enough space." The district, by then, purchased multiple temporary educational buildings totaling $12,000,000. Superintendent Stephen McCanless stated that the development company behind Colony Ridge stated that the student body would increase on a monthly basis by 150.

== Demographics ==
In 2023 85% of the students were Hispanic or Latino Americans. As of that year, about 1,400 of the 11,800 students were born in El Salvador, Honduras, Mexico, and other countries, while the remainder were born in the United States.

== Schools ==
=== High schools ===
6A Classification

- Cleveland High School (Grades 10–12)
- Cleveland 9th Grade Center (Grade 9)

=== Middle schools ===
- Cleveland Middle School (Grades 6–8)
- Santa Fe Middle School (Grades 6–8)

=== Elementary schools ===
- Cottonwood Elementary (Grades Pre-K -5)
- Eastside Elementary (Grades Pre-K -5)
- Northside Elementary (Grades Pre-K -5)
- Southside Elementary (Grades Pre-K -5)
- Pine Burr Elementary (Grades Pre-K -5)
  - It began operations in August 2021. Its original capacity was 1,050. It was overcapacity after opening.
- Santa Fe Elementary (Grades Pre-K -5)
