= Lone Star College–Tomball =

Community college in Tomball, Texas, U.S.

- Type: Community college
- Established: 1988
- Affiliations: Lone Star College System
- President: Lee Ann Nutt
- Students: 8,862
- Location: Tomball, Texas, United States
- Campus: 143 acres (.5787 km²); Urban
- Colors: Red, white, and blue
- Mascot: Timberwolves
- Website: http://lonestar.edu/tomball

Lone Star College–Tomball (formerly Tomball College or TC) is one of six colleges in the Lone Star College System (LSCS) in Texas, United States.

Dedicated and opened in 1988, the college sits on a 143 acres (0.58 km^{2}) (.5787 km^{2}) on SH 249 north of FM 2920 and just south of Spring Creek, which acts as the border between Harris County and Montgomery County. The mailing address for the campus is 30555 Tomball Highway, Tomball, TX, 77375.

== Facilities ==
In 1985, LSCS purchased 143 acres (0.58 km^{2}) in northwest Tomball, Texas. A single megastructure was chosen as the design instead of building several different buildings. The basic design is a cruciform design with each of the four wings named after the compass direction that it points in, resulting in a North, South, East and West wing. Since then the college has grown in size. First the South Wing was expanded; several years later, the college went through a major expansion. In this expansion, the West wing was extended; however, the major work occurred in the East Wing, which greatly extended the size of the campus. In 2005, another expansion project was finished, during which time the library was moved and expanded to its current form as a joint project with Harris County. Also in the project, a Wellness Center, with dance studio, racquetball courts, basketball court, rock-climbing wall, indoor walking track, and various weight-lifting and exercise machines was opened in the North Wing.

== Degrees and certificates offered ==
Lone Star College–Tomball offers the following degrees, among others:

- Nursing
- Occupational therapy
- Cisco Certification (CCNA and CCNP)
- Veterinary technology

== Library ==
Lone Star College–Tomball and Community Library is a joint partnership with the Lone Star College System (LSCS) and the Harris County Public Library system HCPL). It is located at the Lone Star College System-Tomball campus on Tomball Parkway (Highway 249), Tomball, Texas and housed in a 72,000-square-foot (6,700 m^{2}), two-storied building.
