= Lone Star College–Montgomery =

Community college in The Woodlands, Texas, US

Coordinates: 30.21087°N 95.46746°W

- Type: Community college
- Established: 1992; 34 years ago
- Affiliations: Lone Star College System
- Location: The Woodlands, Texas, United States
- Mascot: Mavericks
- Website: lonestar.edu/montgomery

Lone Star College Montgomery (formerly Montgomery College or MC) is a local community college in The Woodlands, Texas, United States, providing academics, transfer, and career training education. Many in-demand degree programs are offered, including nursing, physical therapist assistant, human services, professional pilot, EMS, fire science, engineering, welding, land surveying, and more. The college offers a variety of traditional academic programs, veterans programs, as well as 40+ career and workforce programs and academic transfer courses in many subjects.

Lone Star College Montgomery's college mascot is the Mavericks. Lone Star College Montgomery has undergone significant expansion, including the addition of new buildings such as a 75,000-square-foot academic classroom building, a 60,000-square-foot health science center, and a 20,000-square-foot arts instructional building.

It was founded in 1992 and is part of the Lone Star College System, serving the Montgomery County area.

The current campus was dedicated August 14, 1995, by then-Governor George W. Bush.

== Notable alumni ==
- Preston Fassel, novelist and journalist, Class of 2009
