= Cleveland High School (Texas) =

Location
- 1600 East Houston Street; Cleveland, Texas 77327-4798; United States; 30.33817°N 95.06837°W

Information
- School type: Public high school
- School district: Cleveland Independent School District
- Principal: Kristy Dietrich
- Teaching staff: 207.84 (FTE)
- Grades: 9-12
- Enrollment: 3,627 (2024-2025)
- Student to teacher ratio: 17.45
- Colors: Red, white, and grey
- Athletics conference: UIL Class AAAAAA
- Mascot: big gusher
- Yearbook: Pine Burr
- Website: Cleveland High School

Cleveland High School is a public high school located in the city of Cleveland, Texas, United States and classified as a 6A school by the University Interscholastic League (UIL). It is a part of the Cleveland Independent School District located in northwestern Liberty County. In 2015, the school was rated "Met Standard" by the Texas Education Agency.

As of 2023 this is the only comprehensive high school of Cleveland ISD; the boundary of Cleveland ISD includes the majority of Cleveland, all of North Cleveland and Plum Grove, and the Colony Ridge development.

== Athletics ==
The Cleveland Indians compete in these sports cross country, basketball, football, volleyball, track, cross country, tennis, baseball, soccer, and softball.

=== State titles ===
- Boys Basketball
  - 1986(3A)
