= Lone Star College–CyFair =

Community college in Cypress, Texas, US

- Former names: Cy-Fair College (2003-2007)
- Type: Community college
- Established: 2003
- Affiliations: Lone Star College System
- President: Valerie Jones
- Students: 16,000+
- Location: Cypress, Texas, United States
- Campus: Suburban 200 acres (.808 km^{2})
- Mascot: Falcons

Lone Star College–CyFair, formerly Cy-Fair College, is one of six colleges in the Lone Star College System located in unincorporated Harris County, Texas, United States.

== Vision ==
As more and more of Texas' natural environment is developed by commercial and residential properties, the 200-acre (0.81 km^{2}) Cy-Fair College campus was planned to serve as a model of environmentally responsible development within a sensitive ecosystem, in this case the rapidly vanishing 1,000-square-mile (2,600 km^{2}) Katy Prairie.

== Campus plan ==
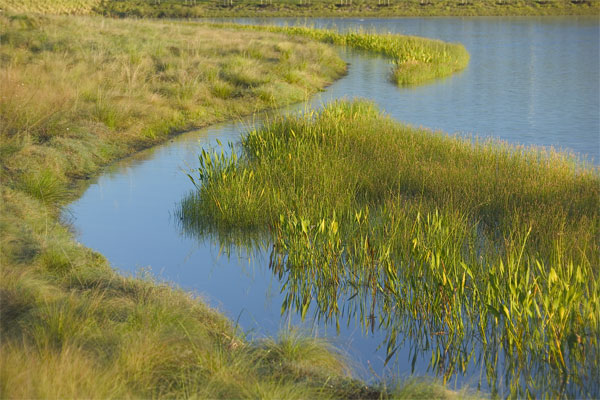
CyFair natural wetlands

The Cy-Fair College campus not only works with the land, it rehabilitates the land.

First, the majority of the previously cleared and over-grazed 200-acre (0.81 km^{2}) site was restored to its native flora and environment. The undulating hills and meadows are now covered in native grasses like Indiangrass, Little Bluestem, and Gulf Coast Muhly, as well as Coreopsis and Liatris wildflowers, and groves of over 3,200 native and indigenous prairie trees like Loblolly Pines, Bald Mexican Sycamores, and Live Oaks.

Second, 18 acres (73,000 m^{2}) of lakes, ponds, and bayous replicate the Katy Prairie's natural wetlands system. Underwater shelves in the larger lakes were planted with native aquatic plants, including Arrowhead and Sand Spikerush. The five buildings in the campus core front some of these lakes.

Third, stormwater runoff from roads, parking lots, and building roofs is captured by the lake system where it is retained, naturally cleansed, and later used for campus irrigation.

Fourth, the campus uses natural systems to protect and enhance the prairie and campus environment. Over 3,200 native and indigenous prairie trees have been planted along the roads and at campus and building entries, throughout parking lots, and along the central lake to significantly reduce heat islands, clean the air, and further integrate the college into the Katy Prairie.

With the restoration of native habitat, wildlife like beaver and deer have already returned to the site, and thousands of migratory birds are using the campus wetlands.

== Harris County Public Library Cy-Fair Branch ==
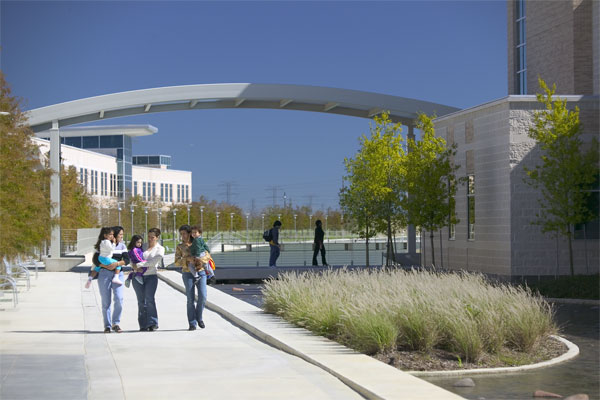
Lone Star College–CyFair 3

The county and the college collaborated to create a joint-use library to enhance services to the public and the college and to save tax dollars. This 78,500 sq ft (7,290 m^{2}). blended library has resulted in extended hours, community meeting rooms, 200+ computers, a children's library, teen room, both tutoring and counseling for students and the public. Not only do the librarians teach research to college students, but also teach English as a Second Language classes, develop community programming using the vast academic resources of a college, teach computer workshops, and sponsor book clubs. The county funds the salary of one counselor so career counseling and resume help can be offered to the public free of charge. Spanish Conversation classes and business research classes are also offered.

== EMS training center, fire station ==
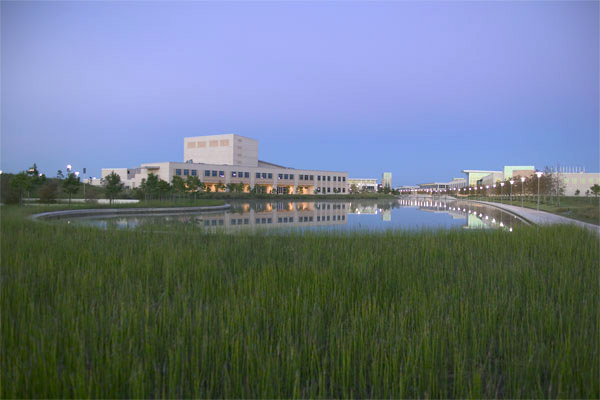
Lone Star College–CyFair 1

According to Cy-Facts and Figures:

In partnership with the Emergency Services District #9 and the Cy-Fair Volunteer Fire Department, a $4 million Emergency Services Training Center was built on college land. Students in Fire Science and Emergency Medical services programs ... have opportunities to develop hands-on skills in this working fire station that includes a simulated emergency room and a state-of-the-art burn facility. The programming that is possible through this facility and the training partnership that it supports will allow the NW Harris County area to meet its need to train firefighters, emergency medical technicians and paramedics.(13)

== Workforce needs ==
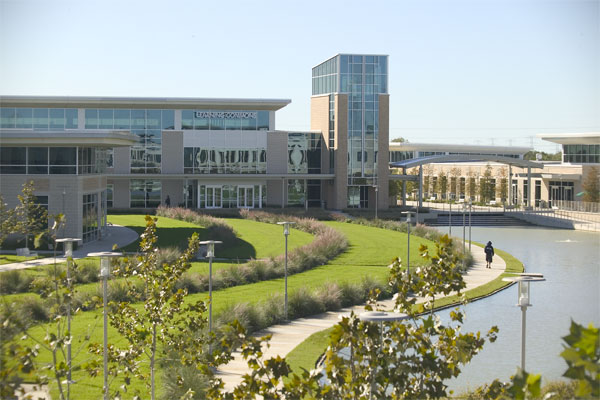
Lone Star College–CyFair 2

The growth of the area prompted Lone Star College–CyFair to provide the area with programs which would support the rapidly changing workplace and world. The support of the business community was a key factor in the success of the petition to create the college and the workforce development programs reflect these needs including emergency services, health careers and nursing, technology and manufacturing.

== 2013 stabbing ==
On April 9, 2013, at 11:20 a.m., fourteen people were injured in a stabbing attack in classrooms on the college campus. That night, two remained hospitalized in critical condition. Most of the victims suffered stab wounds either to the head or neck. The weapons used were an X-Acto knife and a scalpel. The attack ended when the suspect was subdued by multiple students, who held him down on the ground until authorities arrived and arrested him.

Dylan Andrew Quick, a 20-year-old student at the school, was charged in the attack. He was charged with three counts of aggravated assault with a deadly weapon. The news report said that Quick had stated he had fantasies of killing people and had planned the attack. Quick was ordered to undergo a psychiatric evaluation the day after the attack, Wednesday, April 10, 2013, which is common in proceedings similar to these. In addition, Quick allegedly readily admitted to officers during the interrogation that he had had such fantasies when interrogated, having been described as "forthcoming" in an online news release. He was born deaf, has a cochlear implant, and interviews of neighbors and a news conference with the college's president revealed nothing thus far that would seem to suggest such a future occurrence.

In December 2015, Quick was sentenced to 48 years in prison for the attack. He will be eligible for parole in 2037.
