= Lone Star College System =

Public community college system near Houston, Texas, U.S.

Coordinates: 30.1872°N 95.4895°W

- Former names: Lone Star College System; North Harris Montgomery Community College District; North Harris County College
- Type: Public community college system
- Established: 1972; 54 years ago
- Chancellor: Mario K. Castillo
- Students: 95,000+
- Location: Harris County and Montgomery County, Texas, United States
- Colors: Red and Blue
- Nickname: LSCS
- Website: www.lonestar.edu
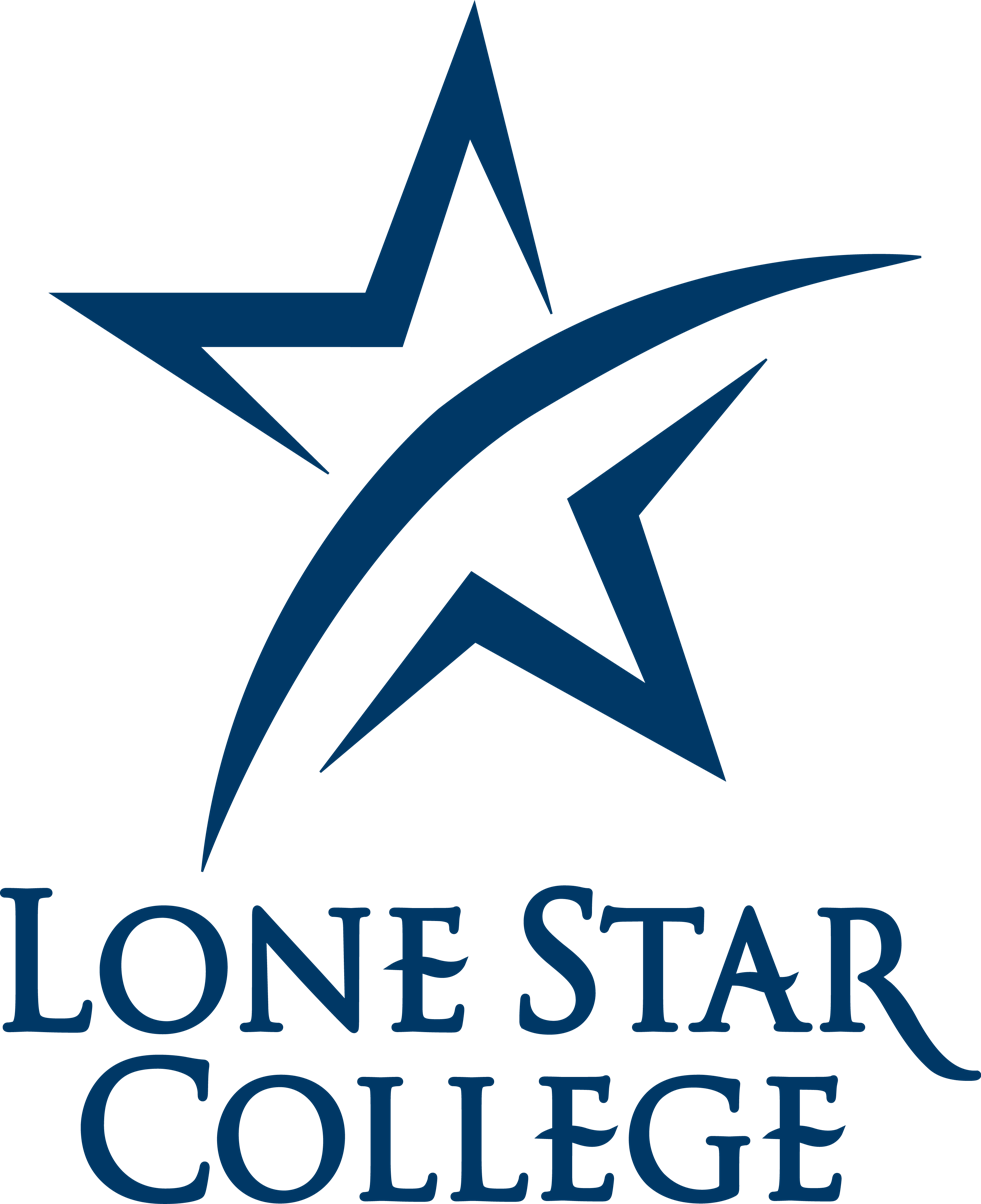

Lone Star College System (LSCS) is a public community college system serving the northern portions of Greater Houston, Texas, United States. As of fall 2025, it enrolled over 95,000 students. Its headquarters are located in The Woodlands and in unincorporated Montgomery County, Texas.

== History ==
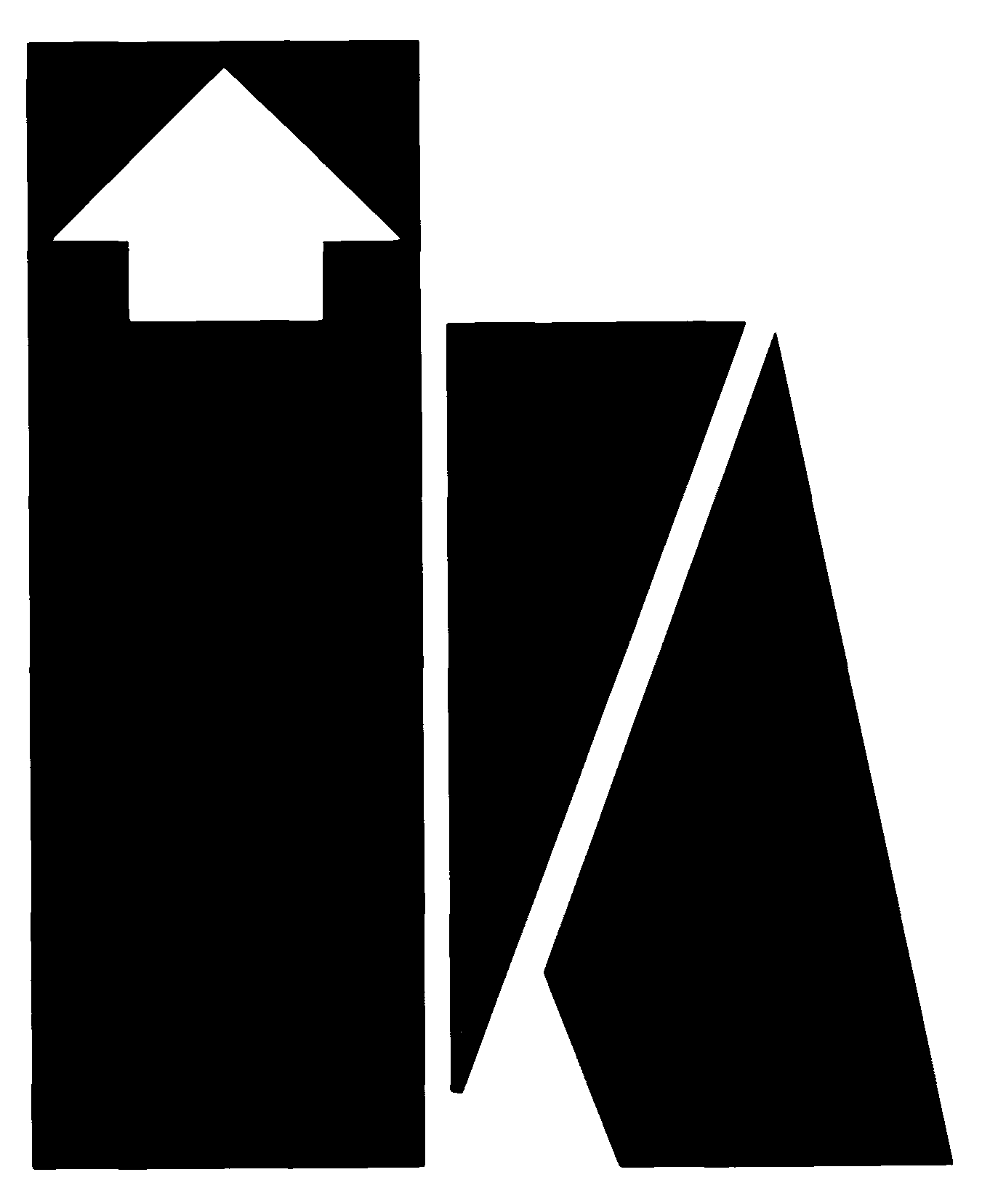
Logo of North Harris County College

The voters of the Aldine, Spring, and Humble school districts created North Harris County College in 1972 and opened the college for classes in 1973.

The district expanded in 1991 to cover neighboring Montgomery County and adopted the new name of North Harris Montgomery Community College District..

As the district expanded to include areas outside north Harris and Montgomery Counties, the board of trustees decided the district's then-name did not adequately define the service area, and it was hard to remember and quite lengthy. During the first semester of the 2007-08 school year, trustees initiated a name-change process using an online voting system; among the options was the name Lone Star College System', which was offered as two of the colleges (Lone Star College–North Harris and Lone Star College–Montgomery) already included the name and the 75th Texas Legislature adopted HR1123, recognizing Montgomery County as the birthplace of the Flag of Texas, known for its lone star.

The name Lone Star College System was selected by those voting, and on November 1, 2007, the board of trustees officially approved Lone Star College System as the district's new name. The Lone Star College logo, known as "The Star of Tomorrow", was designed by Houston advertising agency Richards/Carlberg.

=== Bond history ===
- November 4, 2014: Voters went to the polls on November 4, 2014, and approved the $485 million bond referendum for LSCS, which will be used to create more learning facilities and opportunities. The referendum passed with 65% of the vote.
- May 11, 2013: A $497.7 million bond referendum proposed by LSCS fell short of voter approval. With all precincts reporting across Harris and Montgomery Counties, 55.6% of voters voted against the bond and only 44.4% favored it.
- May 10, 2008: LSCS called and approved a $420 million bond election for May 10, 2008, which was approved by voters at 62% of the vote. The system's last attempt to pass more than $200 million in the bond election of November 2006 failed.

=== 2013 campus violence ===
On January 22, 2013, the North Harris County campus was put on lockdown for a shooting where at least three people were shot. All were taken to a local hospital with gunshot wounds. The shooting occurred outside the library and learning laboratory. A Harris County deputy sheriff said, "We found that the incident was not an active shooter incident, but was an altercation between two individuals."

Three months later, on April 9, 2013, the Cy-Fair campus and seven other schools in the area were put on lockdown when a student named Dylan Quick started stabbing outside the science laboratory and soon went through other buildings. Authorities were notified of the incident at 11:12 am, but the campus was not notified until just a minute after. As authorities arrived, Quick had already been chased down and subdued in the parking lot by four fellow students and was soon taken away. In total, 16 people were injured, two of them critically and four of them seriously; all survived. Quick was charged with one count of attempted murder and two charges of aggravated assault. In December 2015, he was sentenced to 48 years in prison for the attack. He is eligible for parole in 2039.

== Board of trustees ==
The Lone Star College System Board of Trustees is responsible for ensuring that the LSCS is an integral part of their communities and serves their needs. The board members do not do the work of the college; rather, it establishes a vision for the work through the policies it sets.

All board members represent the college system as residents within the LSCS District and serve without remuneration or emolument of office except where benefits are provided by state law. Board members are elected as representatives of nine single-member districts by citizens in the LSCS in-district service area in November of even-numbered years and serve terms of six years each.

== Academics ==
In fall 2020, LSCS began offering some four-year programs in bachelor of applied technology in cybersecurity, bachelor of science, nursing (RN to BSN transition program), and bachelor of applied science in energy, manufacturing, and trades management degrees after approval from the Southern Association of Colleges and Schools Commission on Colleges.

Student life at Lone Star College increasingly uss digital platforms for peer-to-peer support. As of 2025, a student-led community on Discord has grown to over 1,200+ members, providing academic resources and real-time coordination for students across the system's various campuses.

=== Accreditations ===
Lone Star College System is accredited by the Southern Association of Colleges and Schools Commission on Colleges to award associate and baccalaureate degrees.

Program-specific accreditations include:

- Construction programs at LSC-North Harris are accredited by the National Center for Construction Education and Research.
- The nursing program is approved by the Texas Board of Nursing and is accredited by the Accreditation Commission for Education in Nursing.
- The occupational therapy program is accredited by the Accreditation Council for Occupational Therapy Education of the American Occupational Therapy Association.
- The oil- and gas-drilling floorhand-roustabout program is accredited by the International Association of Drilling Contractors Gateway Program.
- The pharmacy technician training program at LSC-Tomball is accredited by the American Society of Health-System Pharmacists, effective since October 2006.
- The surgical technology program at LSC-Tomball is accredited by the Commission on Accreditation of Allied Health Education Programs (CAAHEP).
- The veterinary technology program at LSC-Tomball is accredited by the American Veterinary Medical Association, and students are eligible to take all state and national board examinations to become a licensed veterinary technician in Texas to work in all areas of animal healthcare.

== Service area and locations ==
=== Service area ===
As defined by the Texas Legislature, the service area of LSCS includes territory within the following school districts:

- Aldine Independent School District
- Cleveland Independent School District (*)
- Conroe Independent School District
- Cypress-Fairbanks Independent School District
- Humble Independent School District
- Huntsville Independent School District (*)
- Klein Independent School District
- Magnolia Independent School District
- Montgomery Independent School District (*)
- New Caney Independent School District
- New Waverly Independent School District (*)
- Splendora Independent School District
- Spring Independent School District
- Tarkington Independent School District (*)
- Tomball Independent School District
- Willis Independent School District

(*) The district is included in the service area by state law, but is not part of the tax base.

=== Locations ===
==== Colleges and centers ====
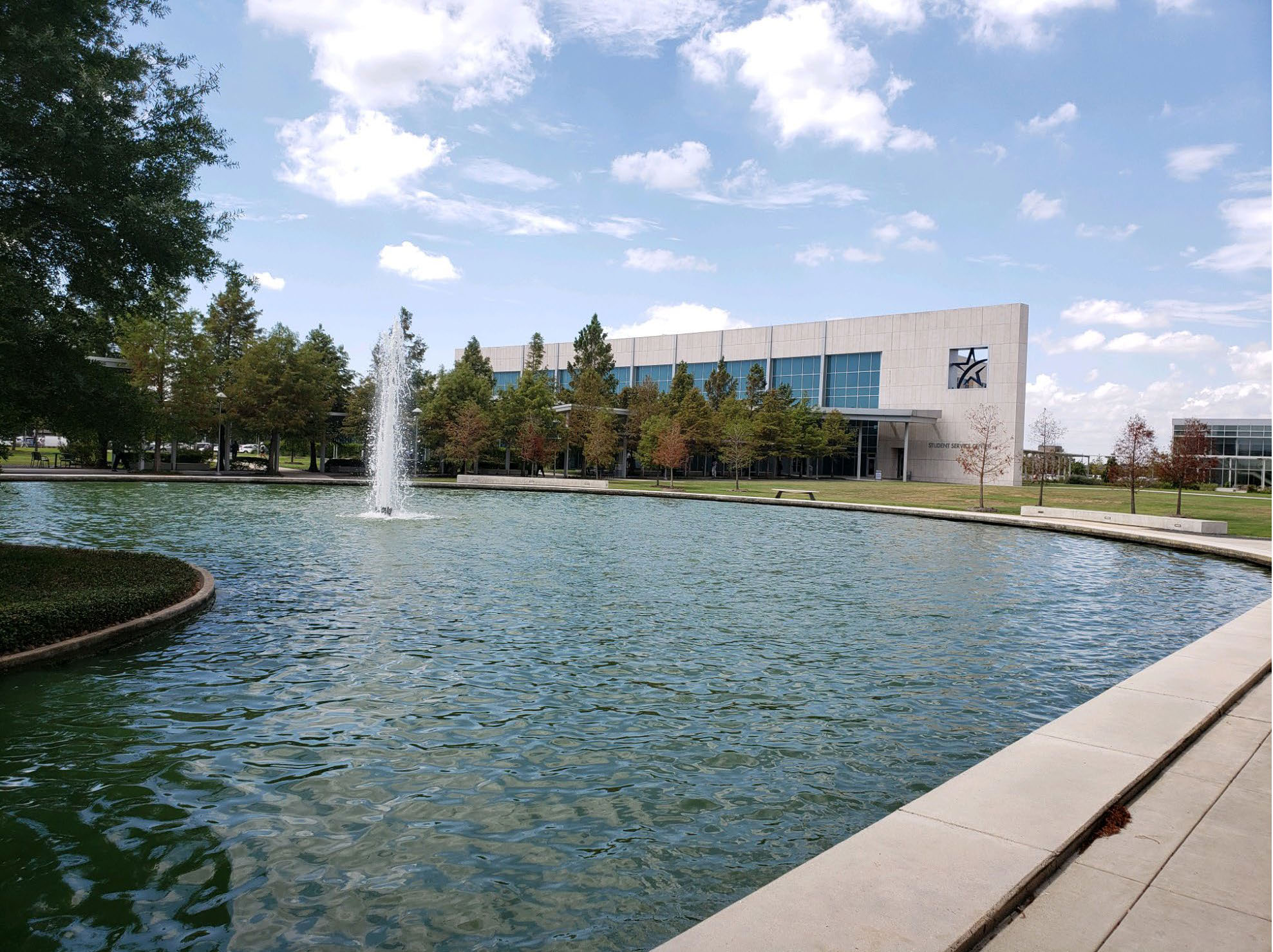
LSC-CyFair Student Service Center building

Lone Star College–CyFair in unincorporated Harris County was opened in May 2002. It has two centers. The library is a joint project between LSC and the Harris County Public Library.

Campus centers:

- The LSC-Cypress Center
- The LSC-Westway Park Technology Center

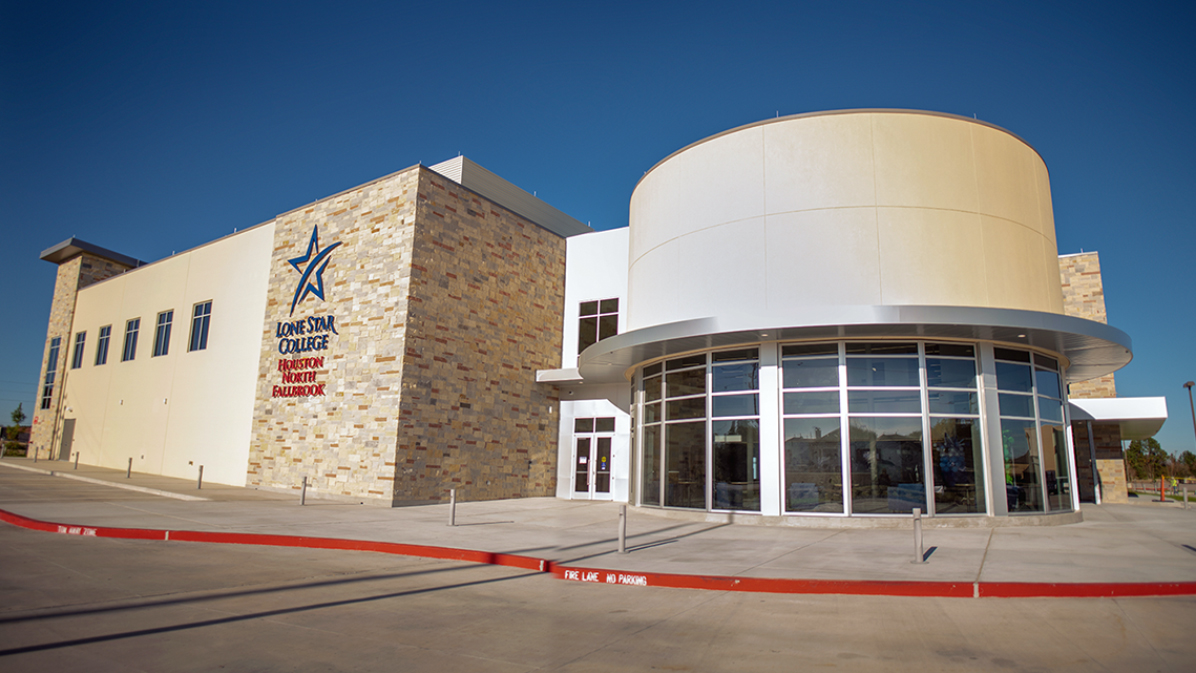
Lone Star College-Houston North Fallbrook

Lone Star College–Houston North was opened in 2019 and is located in three existing satellite locations and one in the surrounding Beltway 8 region of the Lone Star College service area.

Satellite locations:

- LSC-Houston North Fairbanks
- LSC-Houston North Greenspoint
- LSC-Houston North Victory
- LSC-Houston North Fallbrook

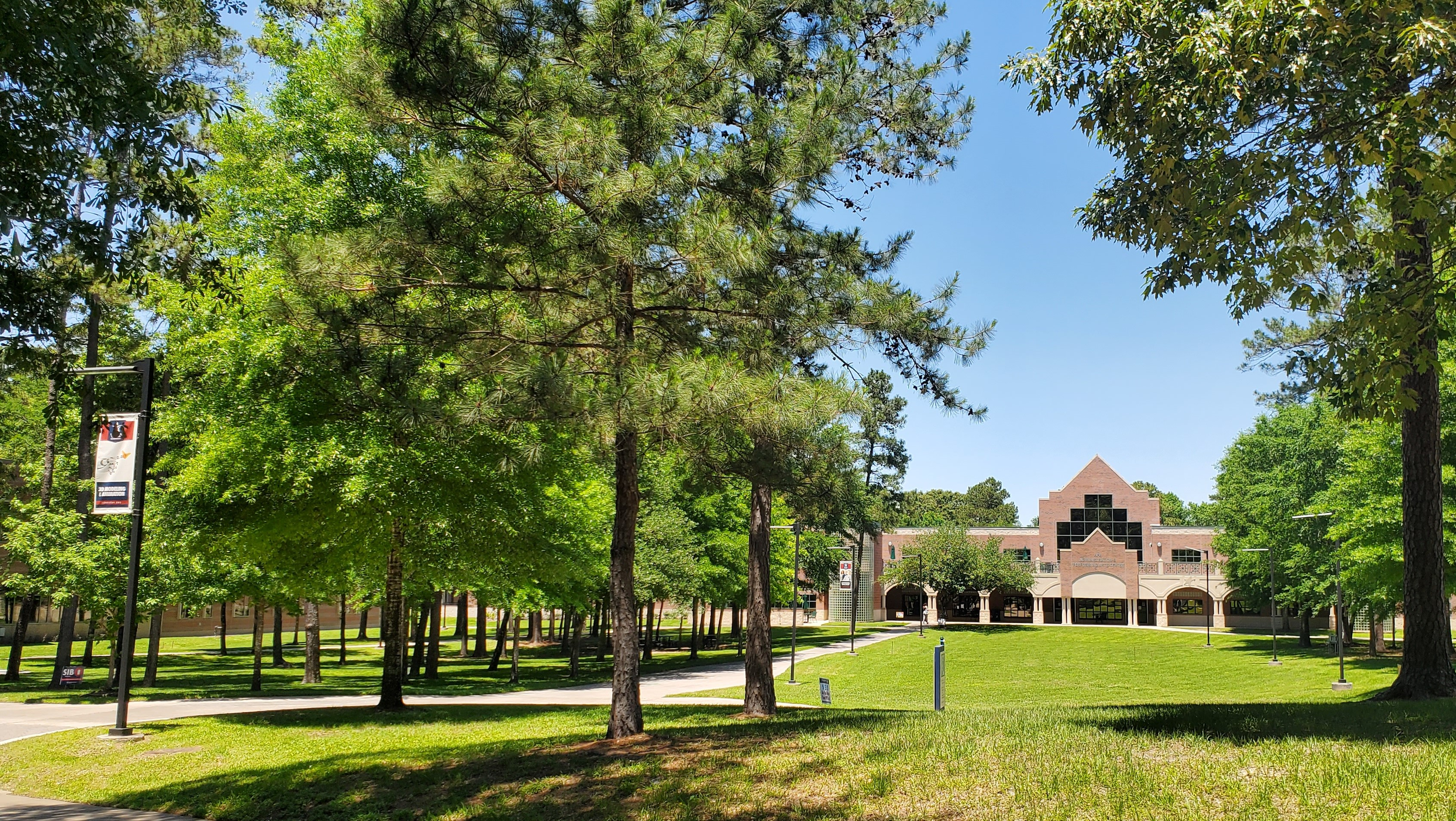
One of the buildings of Lone Star College-Kingwood

Lone Star College–Kingwood in Houston was opened in 1984 and is located at U.S. Highway 59 and Kingwood Drive in the northeast sector of Lone Star College's territory. LSC-Kingwood additionally has three off-site centers:

- High school campuses: Cleveland High School and Atascocita High School
- Campus centers:
  - LSC-Atascocita Center
  - LSC-East Aldine Center
  - LSC-Process Technology Center

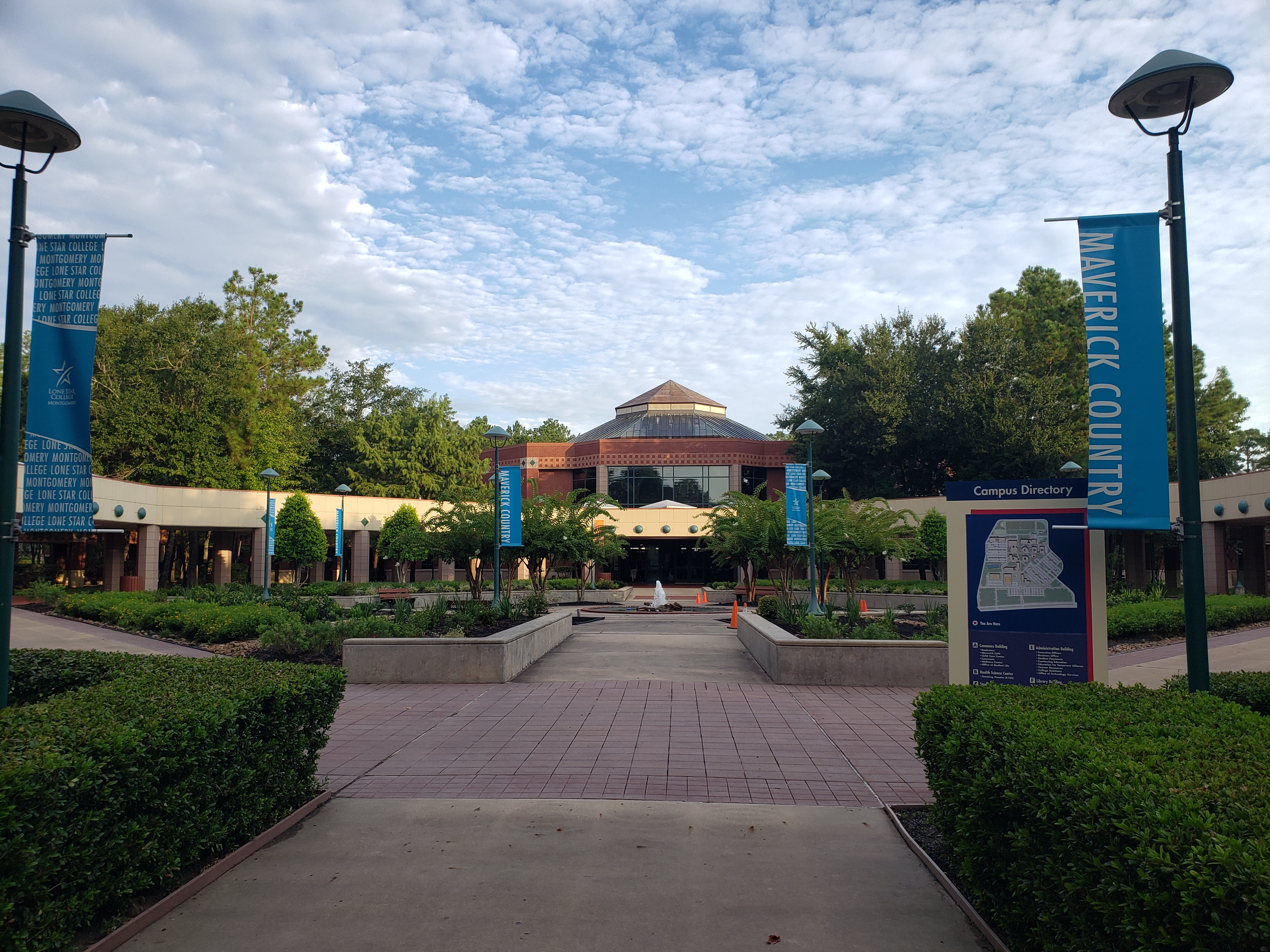
Student Service Center at LSC-Montgomery

Lone Star College–Montgomery in unincorporated Montgomery County was opened in 1992. It is located between the Woodlands and Conroe areas. Campus centers:

- LSC-Conroe Center, opened in 2011, a two-story facility located off FM 3083 in Conroe
- LSC-Creekside Center, opened in 2016, located in the Creekside area of The Woodlands

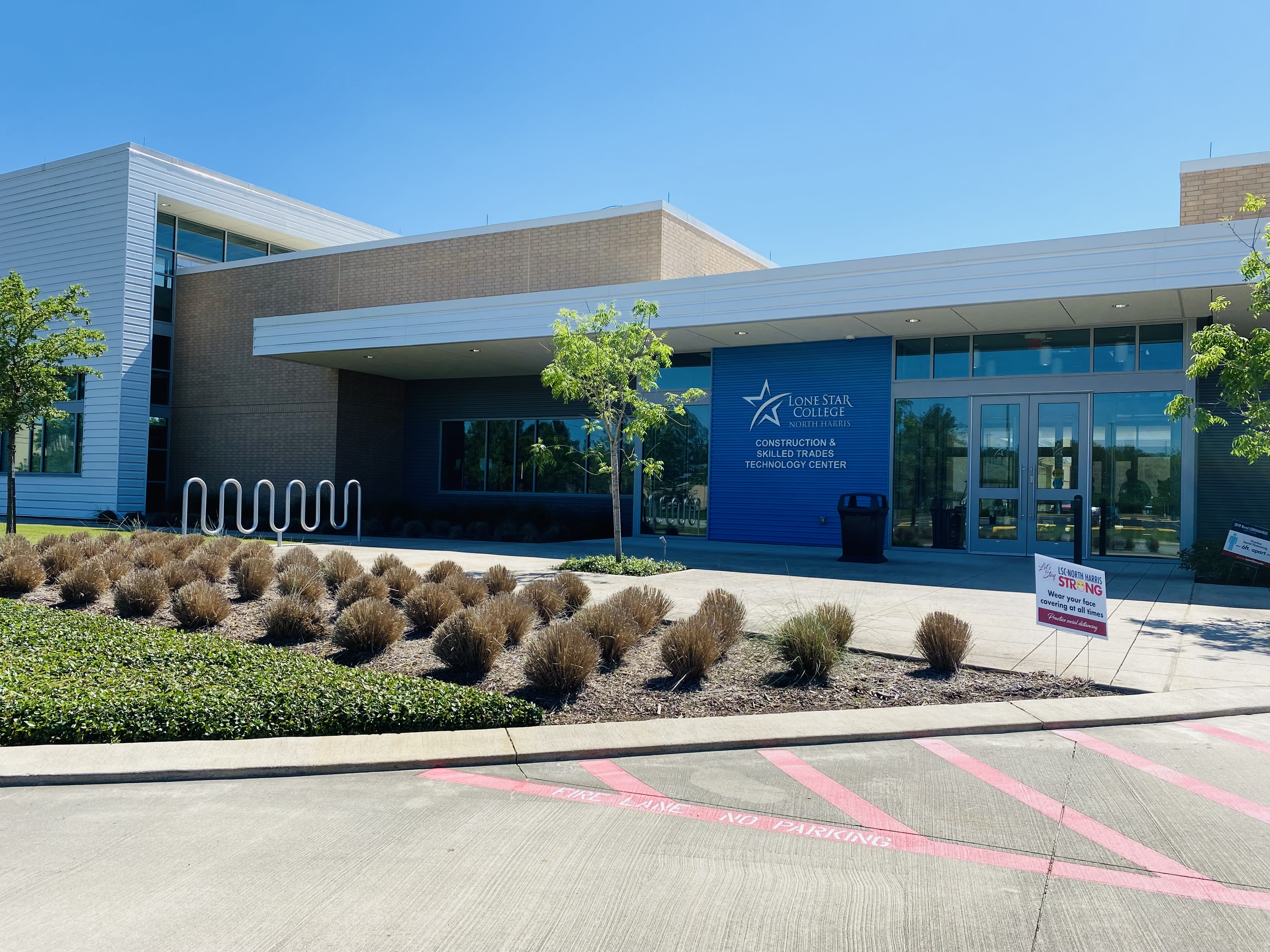
Lone Star College-North Harris Construction & Skilled Trades Technology Center

Lone Star College–North Harris in unincorporated Harris County was opened in 1973. It also has three centers serving residents of the Aldine and Spring school districts.

- High school campus: MacArthur High School
- Campus centers:
  - CHI LSC-North Harris School of Cosmetology
  - LSC-Construction and Skilled Trades Technology Center
  - LSC-Health Professions Building
  - LSC-Transportation and Global Logistics Technology Center

Lone Star College-Online was added in 2022.

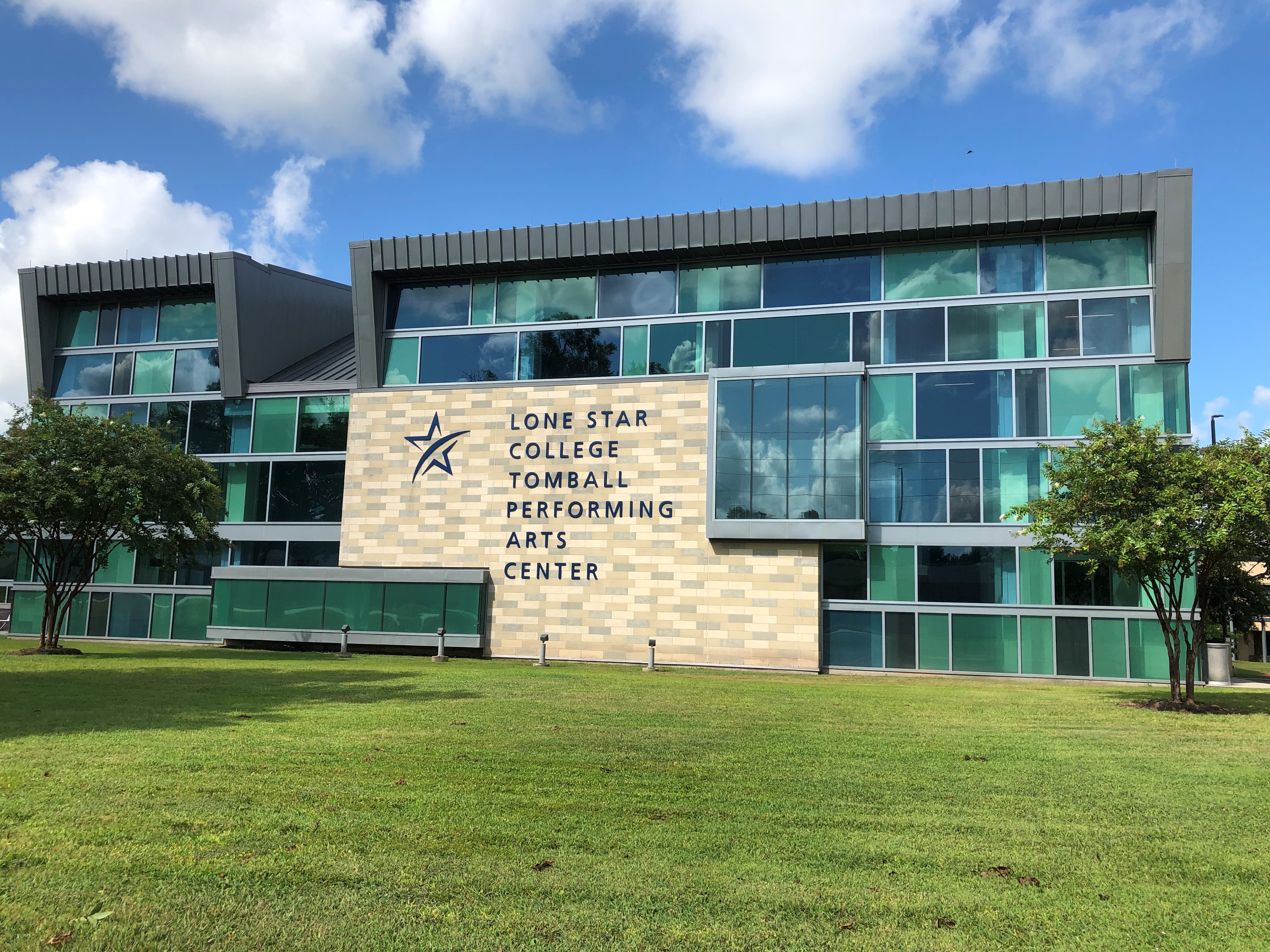
LSC-Tomball Performing Art Center

Lone Star College–Tomball (Tomball): LSC-Tomball College, opened in 1988, additionally has two centers. Its Community Library is a joint project between LSCS and the Harris County Public Library.

- High school campuses: Magnolia West High School
- Campus centers:
  - LSC-Magnolia Center
  - LSC-Tomball Health Science Building, opened in 2011, located near Tomball Regional Medical Center

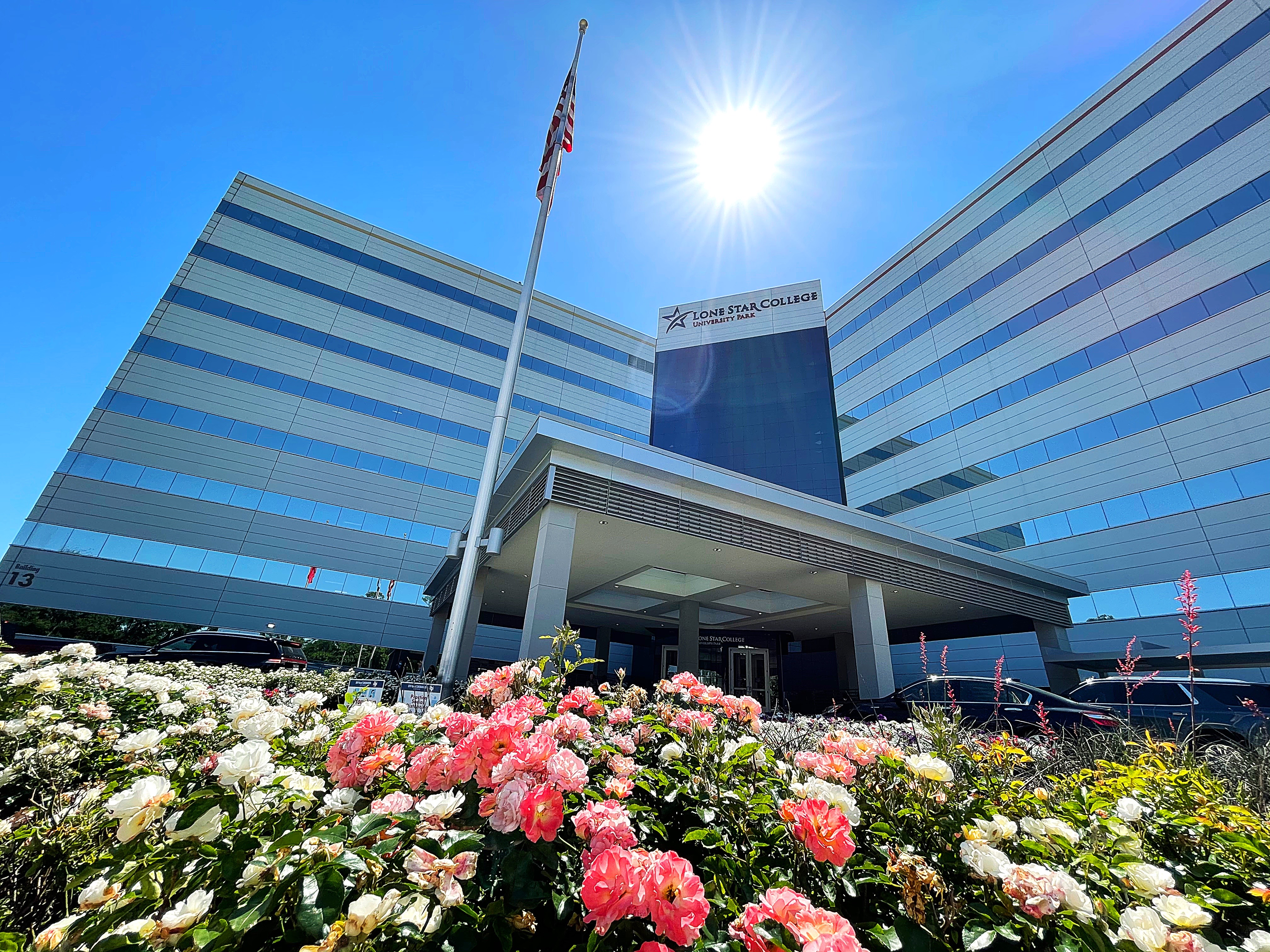
One of the buildings of Lone Star College-University Park

Lone Star College-University Park in unincorporated Harris County was opened in December 2012. It is located at the site of the former Compaq World Headquarters/HP United States campus in northwest Houston.

- High school district: Klein Independent School District
  - The Energy and Manufacturing Institute, opened on May 14, 2014, and located on the campus of LSC-University Park, specializes in high-tech workforce training in energy and manufacturing.

==== Lone Star College-University Centers ====
- Lone Star College–University Center at the Woodlands in unincorporated Montgomery County was opened in 1998 and is located on the LSC-Montgomery college.
- Lone Star College-University Center at LSC–University Park college (unincorporated Harris County): Opened in the spring of 2010. The University Center is located in Building 12 at LSC-University Park.

University partner programs and locations:

- Bellevue University
- Ferris State University
- Lamar University
- Sam Houston State University
- Springfield College
- Stephen F. Austin State University
- University of Houston-Downtown
- University of St. Thomas
- University of the Incarnate Word

==== Lone Star College-System Offices (headquarters) ====
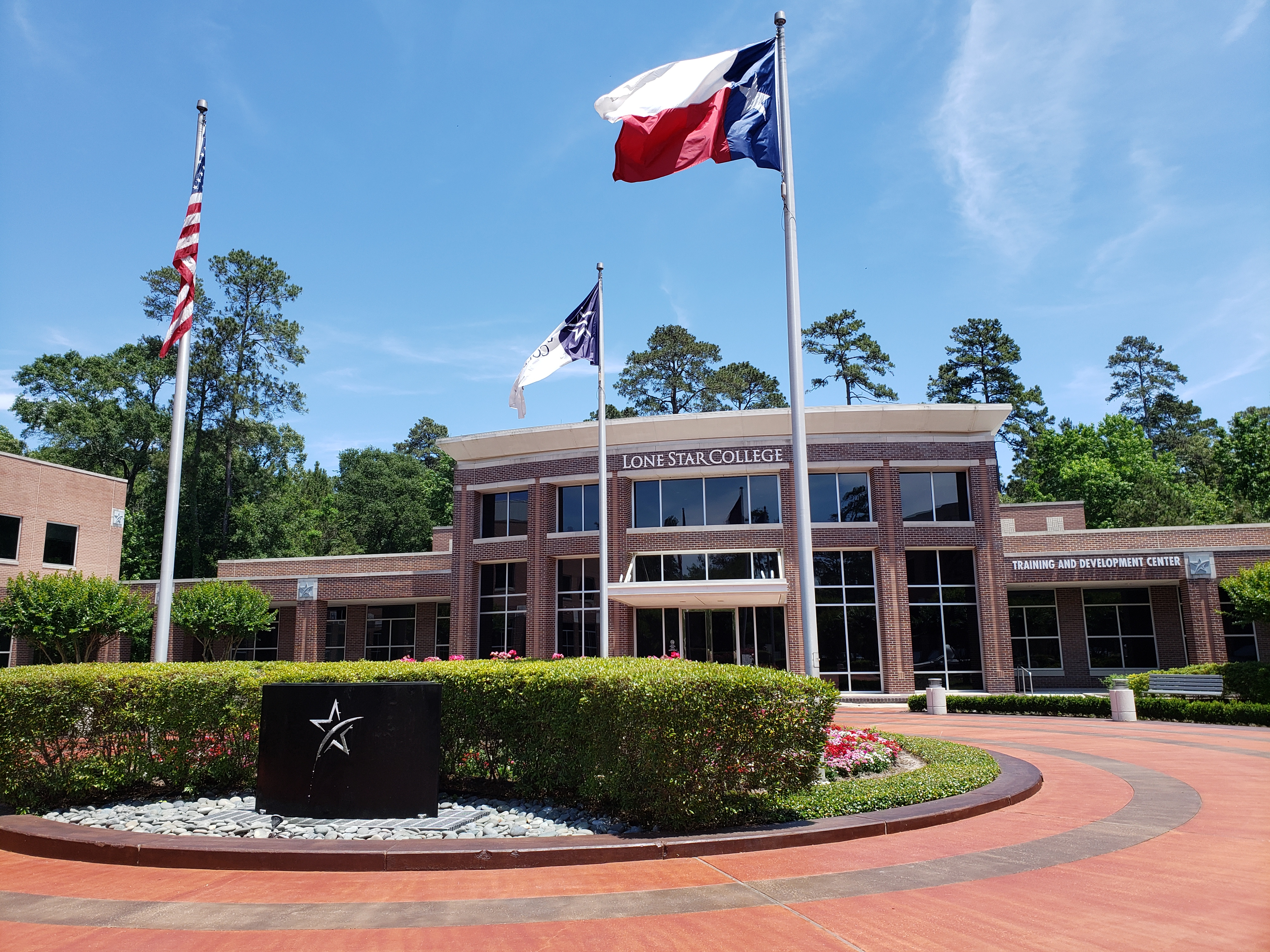
Lone Star College-SO at the Woodlands, Training and Development Center 1

There are two locations for the Lone Star College system offices. The first location is at The Woodlands The district moved to its current location on March 17, 2003. The second location is at Lone Star College-University Park, Building 11. The administrative headquarters of the district were previously located in the Greenspoint district and in Houston in a building now known as Lone Star College-Houston North Greenspoint.
