= Cove, Texas =

- City
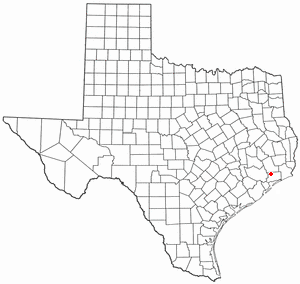
- Location of Cove, Texas

- Coordinates: 29°48′42″N 94°48′40″W
- Country: United States
- State: Texas
- County: Chambers

Area
  - Total: 1.27 sq mi (3.28 km^{2})
  - Land: 1.22 sq mi (3.15 km^{2})
  - Water: 0.050 sq mi (0.13 km^{2})
- Elevation: 30 ft (9.1 m)

Population (2020)
  - Total: 525
  - Density: 459.3/sq mi (177.34/km^{2})
- Time zone: UTC-6 (Central (CST))
  - Summer (DST): UTC-5 (CDT)
- FIPS code: 48-17336
- GNIS feature ID: 2410250

Cove is a city in Chambers County, Texas, United States. The population was 525 at the 2020 census, up from 510 at the 2010 census.

== Geography ==
Cove is located in northwestern Chambers County on the west side of Old River Lake, an arm of the Trinity River. Interstate 10 passes the northern end of the town, with access from Exit 803. I-10 leads west 35 miles (56 km) to Houston and east 49 miles (79 km) to Beaumont.

According to the United States Census Bureau, Cove has a total area of 1.2 square miles (3.2 km^{2}), of which 1.2 square miles (3.1 km^{2}) is land and 0.04 square miles (0.1 km^{2}), or 4.11%, is water.

== Historical development ==
This site was originally called Winfree's Cove, after an early pioneer settler named A. B. J. Winfree. In 1871, the first cotton gin in the county was operating there under the ownership of William Icet. Nine years later, Icet sold the gin and ran a shipyard with the help of his two sons until 1915. The post office at Cove was first opened in 1894 (now closed). The Icet family also operated a sawmill at the site, which had a population of 150 residents by 1920. After the 1940s, the nearby established chemical plants helped to boost the population. In the 1970s there were rumors that Baytown, 13 miles (21 km) to the southwest, intended to annex the community. On September 22, 1970, 84 residents sent a petition to nearby Beach City to annex the community. On November 24, 1970, Beach City annexed Cove, an area bounded generally on the west by FM-2354, on the east by the Old and Lost Rivers, on the south by Lawrence Road, and on the north by a line just north of FM-565. On December 2, 1970, Beach City extended its Cove annexation to include the property where the old Cove Community Building sits. Baytown did not concur. In 1971, Baytown sued Beach City in an attempt to stop the annexation of Cove. In 1973, Beach City released its claim to what are now the city limits of Cove. An incorporation election was held and the City of Cove was incorporated on May 23, 1973. Leroy Stevens was Cove's first mayor. The City Council of Beach City presented to Mayor Stevens Cove's first municipal seal, which is believed to be the one still in use.

== Demographics ==
Historical population
Census	Pop.	Note	%±
1980	645		—
1990	402		−37.7%
2000	323		−19.7%
2010	510		57.9%
2020	525		2.9%
U.S. Decennial Census

=== 2020 census ===
As of the 2020 census, Cove had a population of 525. The median age was 38.9 years. 25.9% of residents were under the age of 18 and 13.7% of residents were 65 years of age or older. For every 100 females there were 91.6 males, and for every 100 females age 18 and over there were 85.2 males age 18 and over.

89.7% of residents lived in urban areas, while 10.3% lived in rural areas.

There were 205 households in Cove, of which 34.6% had children under the age of 18 living in them. Of all households, 56.1% were married-couple households, 14.6% were households with a male householder and no spouse or partner present, and 23.4% were households with a female householder and no spouse or partner present. About 19.5% of all households were made up of individuals and 9.8% had someone living alone who was 65 years of age or older.

There were 223 housing units, of which 8.1% were vacant. The homeowner vacancy rate was 3.8% and the rental vacancy rate was 3.7%.

Racial composition as of the 2020 census
Race	Number	Percent
White	466	88.8%
Black or African American	3	0.6%
American Indian and Alaska Native	1	0.2%
Asian	1	0.2%
Native Hawaiian and Other Pacific Islander	0	0.0%
Some other race	12	2.3%
Two or more races	42	8.0%
Hispanic or Latino (of any race)	43	8.2%

=== 2000 census ===
At the 2000 census, there were 323 people, 125 households and 91 families residing in the city. The population density was 265.3 inhabitants per square mile (102.4/km^{2}). There were 146 housing units at an average density of 119.9 per square mile (46.3/km^{2}). The racial makeup of the city was 92.26% White, 1.86% African American, 0.31% Native American, 5.26% from other races, and 0.31% from two or more races. Hispanic or Latino of any race were 4.64% of the population.

There were 125 households, of which 40.0% had children under the age of 18 living with them, 56.0% were married couples living together, 10.4% had a female householder with no husband present, and 26.4% were non-families. 21.6% of all households were made up of individuals, and 4.8% had someone living alone who was 65 years of age or older. The average household size was 2.54 and the average family size was 2.93.

26.0% of the population were under the age of 18, 8.7% from 18 to 24, 34.1% from 25 to 44, 23.2% from 45 to 64, and 8.0% who were 65 years of age or older. The median age was 36 years. For every 100 females, there were 103.1 males. For every 100 females age 18 and over, there were 99.2 males.

The median household income was $44,750 and the median family income was $49,286. Males had a median income of $44,219 versus $30,625 for females. The per capita income for the city was $24,514. About 6.7% of families and 10.7% of the population were below the poverty line, including 22.9% of those under age 18 and none of those age 65 or over.

== Education ==
The city is zoned to Barbers Hill Independent School District in Mont Belvieu.

Zoned schools include:

- Barbers Hill Kindergarten Center
- Barbers Hill Primary School
- Barbers Hill Elementary School North
- Barbers Hill Elementary School South
- Barbers Hill Middle School North
- Barbers Hill Middle School South
- Barbers Hill High School

Residents of Barbers Hill ISD are zoned to Lee College.
