= Devers, Texas =

- City
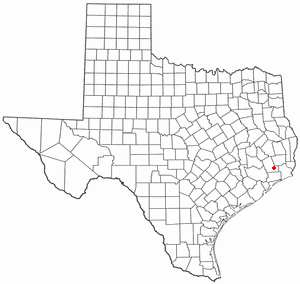
- Location of Devers, Texas

- Coordinates: 30°01′43″N 94°35′10″W
- Country: United States
- State: Texas
- County: Liberty

Area
  - Total: 1.86 sq mi (4.82 km^{2})
  - Land: 1.86 sq mi (4.82 km^{2})
  - Water: 0 sq mi (0.00 km^{2})
- Elevation: 56 ft (17 m)

Population (2020)
  - Total: 361
  - Density: 194/sq mi (74.9/km^{2})
- Time zone: UTC-6 (Central (CST))
  - Summer (DST): UTC-5 (CDT)
- ZIP code: 77538
- Area code: 936
- FIPS code: 48-20140
- GNIS feature ID: 2410331
- Website: cityofdevers.com

Devers is a city in Liberty County, Texas, United States. The population was 361 at the 2020 census.

== Geography ==
According to the United States Census Bureau, the city has a total area of 1.9 square miles (4.9 km^{2}), all land.

== Demographics ==
Historical population
Census	Pop.	Note	%±
1980	507		—
1990	318		−37.3%
2000	416		30.8%
2010	447		7.5%
2020	361		−19.2%
U.S. Decennial Census; 1850–1900 1910; 1920 1930 1940; 1950 1960 1970; 1980 1990 2000; 2010 2020

=== 2020 census ===
As of the 2020 census, Devers had a population of 361. The median age was 43.2 years. 22.4% of residents were under the age of 18 and 20.2% of residents were 65 years of age or older. For every 100 females there were 91.0 males, and for every 100 females age 18 and over there were 87.9 males age 18 and over.

0.0% of residents lived in urban areas, while 100.0% lived in rural areas.

There were 138 households in Devers, of which 27.5% had children under the age of 18 living in them. Of all households, 58.7% were married-couple households, 16.7% were households with a male householder and no spouse or partner present, and 21.0% were households with a female householder and no spouse or partner present. About 18.1% of all households were made up of individuals and 8.7% had someone living alone who was 65 years of age or older.

There were 162 housing units, of which 14.8% were vacant. The homeowner vacancy rate was 5.1% and the rental vacancy rate was 16.7%.

Racial composition as of the 2020 census
Race	Number	Percent
White	250	69.3%
Black or African American	18	5.0%
American Indian and Alaska Native	10	2.8%
Asian	2	0.6%
Native Hawaiian and Other Pacific Islander	0	0.0%
Some other race	60	16.6%
Two or more races	21	5.8%
Hispanic or Latino (of any race)	88	24.4%

=== 2000 census ===
As of the 2000 census, there were 416 people, 141 households, and 111 families residing in the city. The population density was 222.3 inhabitants per square mile (85.8/km^{2}). There were 165 housing units at an average density of 88.2 per square mile (34.1/km^{2}). The racial makeup of the city was 69.47% White, 14.90% African American, 0.24% Native American, 13.94% from other races, and 1.44% from two or more races. Hispanic or Latino of any race were 20.43% of the population.

There were 141 households, out of which 36.9% had children under the age of 18 living with them, 63.8% were married couples living together, 12.8% had a female householder with no husband present, and 20.6% were non-families. 16.3% of all households were made up of individuals, and 8.5% had someone living alone who was 65 years of age or older. The average household size was 2.95 and the average family size was 3.31.

In the city, the population was spread out, with 30.3% under the age of 18, 5.8% from 18 to 24, 28.6% from 25 to 44, 22.8% from 45 to 64, and 12.5% who were 65 years of age or older. The median age was 34 years. For every 100 females, there were 97.2 males. For every 100 females age 18 and over, there were 87.1 males.

The median income for a household in the city was $30,278, and the median income for a family was $31,042. Males had a median income of $30,625 versus $15,208 for females. The per capita income for the city was $14,962. About 23.6% of families and 22.6% of the population were below the poverty line, including 23.5% of those under age 18 and 16.7% of those age 65 or over.

== Education ==
Devers Independent School District is the designated school district, and serves students in grades pre-kindergarten through eighth. Students in grades nine through twelve attend either Liberty High School in the Liberty Independent School District or Hull-Daisetta High in the Hull-Daisetta Independent School District.

Residents of Devers ISD are zoned to Lee College.
