= Beach City =

Beach City may refer to:

== Places ==
- Beach City, Ohio
- Beach City, Texas
- A nickname for Berbera
- Beach City, Delmarva, a fictional town in the Cartoon Network show Steven Universe
- Beach City International Stadium- an Arena in Indonesia

== Geography ==
- A coastal settlement with accessible beaches
