= RWJ Airpark =

Coordinates: 29°45′42″N 094°50′47″W

- IATA: none; ICAO: none; FAA LID: 54T

Summary
- Airport type: Public
- Owner: R. W. Johnson Const Co. Inc.
- Serves: Beach City, Texas
- Elevation AMSL: 30 ft / 9 m
- Website: www.rwjairpark.com

Map

Runways
| Direction | Length | | Surface |
| Direction | ft | m | Surface |
|---|---|---|---|
| 8/26 | 5,035 | 1,535 | Asphalt |
| 14/32 | 3,500 | 1,067 | Turf |

Statistics (2004)
- Aircraft operations: 9,300
- Based aircraft: 45
- Source: airport web site and FAA

RWJ Airpark (FAA LID: 54T) is a public-use airport located in Beach City, Chambers County, Texas, United States, seven miles (11 km) east of the central business district of Baytown. It was privately owned by the R. W. Johnson Const. Co. Inc, but, as of 2022, its owned by IMC Service and Supply.

== History ==
Previously the runway was 4,100 feet (1,200 m) in length. By 1986 the runway was increased to 5,100 feet (1,600 m). This runway, at the time, had the most length of any airport between Beaumont and Houston.

In 1986 Lee College announced it would use RWJ Airpark for its pilot instruction classes. It previously used Baytown Airport until that facility closed.

In 2003 an unapproved tower placed by the college appeared at the airport. After a pilot raised concern and contacted the county, the college decided to move the tower.

== Facilities and aircraft ==
RWJ Airpark covers an area of 55 acres (22 ha) which contains two runways: 8/26 with a 5,035 ft × 40 ft (1,535 m × 12 m) asphalt pavement and 14/32 with a 3,500 ft × 100 ft (1,067 m × 30 m) turf surface.

For the 12-month period ending July 12, 2004, the airport had 9,300 general aviation aircraft operations, an average of 25 per day. At that time there were 45 aircraft based at the airport: 67% single-engine, 7% multi-engine and 27% ultralight.

== See also ==
- List of airports in Texas
