= Eaglin =

Eaglin is a surname. Notable people with the name include:

- Dwight Eaglin, American serial killer
- Snooks Eaglin, American guitarist and singer
- David Eaglin, United States Air Force major general
- Larry Eaglin, American former professional football defensive back
- Jane Eaglen, also spelt Jane Eaglin, English dramatic soprano
