= Cameron Cauley =

American baseball player (born 2003)

Texas Rangers – No. 27
- Infielder
- Born: February 6, 2003 (age 23); Houston, Texas, U.S.
- Bats: Right Throws: Right

MLB debut
- June 29, 2026, for the Texas Rangers

MLB statistics (through 2026 season)
- Batting average: .207
- Home runs: 1
- Runs batted in: 1

Teams
- Texas Rangers (2026–present)

Cameron Andrew Cauley (born February 6, 2003) is an American professional baseball infielder for the Texas Rangers of Major League Baseball (MLB).

== Amateur career ==
Cauley attended Barbers Hill High School in Mont Belvieu, Texas. Cauley played on the Barbers Hill football team, where he was an all-state wide receiver his junior year. During his senior season of 2021, Cauley hit .450 with 6 home runs, 35 RBI, and 52 stolen bases and won the Class 5A Baseball State Championship. He was named the All-Greater Houston hitter of the year by the Houston Chronicle. Cauley had committed to play college baseball at Texas Tech. Entering the 2021 draft, he was ranked as the 85th overall prospect by Baseball America, the 92nd by MLB Pipeline, and the 138th by ESPN.

== Professional career ==
Cauley was drafted by the Texas Rangers in the third round, with the 73rd overall selection, in the 2021 Major League Baseball draft. He signed with Texas for an over-slot $1MM signing bonus.

Cauley made his professional debut in 2021 with the ACL Rangers of the Rookie-level Arizona Complex League, hitting .255/.311/.383/.694 with 17 RBI and 10 stolen bases over 24 games. He spent the 2022 season with the Down East Wood Ducks of the Low-A Carolina League, hitting .209/.306/.289/.595 with two home runs, 21 RBI, and 38 stolen bases over 77 games. Returning to Down East to open the 2023 season, Cauley hit .244/.331/.405/.736 with 7 home runs, 33 RBI, and 22 stolen bases over 66 games. He was promoted to the Hickory Crawdads of the High-A South Atlantic League on July 18. Over 34 games for Hickory in 2023, Cauley hit .248/.336/.424/.760 with five home runs, 24 RBI, and 14 stolen bases. Following the 2023 season, Cauley played for the Surprise Saguaros of the Arizona Fall League.

Cauley split the 2024 season between the ACL, Hickory and the Frisco RoughRiders of the Double-A Texas League, hitting a combined .240/.304/.435/.739 with 15 home runs, 41 RBI, and 27 stolen bases while being caught three times. He returned to Frisco for the 2025 season, hitting .253/.325/.448/.773 with 15 home runs, 51 RBI, and 28 stolen bases while being caught seven times.

Cauley opened the 2026 season with the Round Rock Express of the Triple-A Pacific Coast League. On June 26, 2026, Cauley was selected to the 40–man roster and promoted to the major leagues for the first time. On July 22, Cauley hit his first career home run off of Anthony Kay of the Chicago White Sox.
