= Larry Eaglin =

American football player (born 1948)

No. 26
- Position: Cornerback

Personal information
- Born: August 27, 1948 (age 78); Raywood, Texas, U.S.
- Listed height: 6 ft 3 in (1.91 m)
- Listed weight: 195 lb (88 kg)

Career information
- High school: Daisetta (TX) Hull-Daisetta
- College: Stephen F. Austin
- NFL draft: 1973: 11th round, 261st overall pick

Career history
- Houston Oilers (1973)
- Stats at Pro Football Reference

Larry Eaglin (born August 27, 1948) is an American former professional football defensive back. He played for the Houston Oilers in 1973.
