= Old River-Winfree, Texas =

- City
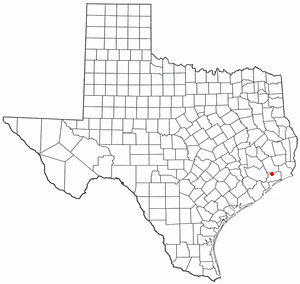
- Location of Old River-Winfree, Texas

- Coordinates: 29°52′36″N 94°49′29″W
- Country: United States
- State: Texas
- County: Chambers, Liberty

Area
  - Total: 1.57 sq mi (4.06 km^{2})
  - Land: 1.57 sq mi (4.06 km^{2})
  - Water: 0 sq mi (0.00 km^{2})
- Elevation: 10 ft (3.0 m)

Population (2020)
  - Total: 1,315
  - Density: 936.2/sq mi (361.46/km^{2})
- Time zone: UTC-6 (Central (CST))
  - Summer (DST): UTC-5 (CDT)
- FIPS code: 48-53824
- GNIS feature ID: 2411313
- Website: cityofoldriverwinfree.com

Old River-Winfree is a city in Chambers and Liberty counties, Texas, United States. The population was 1,315 at the 2020 census.

== Geography ==
Old River-Winfree is located in northwestern Chambers County. A small portion extends north into Liberty County.

According to the United States Census Bureau, the city has a total area of 1.6 square miles (4.1 km^{2}), all land.

== Demographics ==
Historical population
Census	Pop.	Note	%±
1980	1,058		—
1990	1,233		16.5%
2000	1,364		10.6%
2010	1,245		−8.7%
2020	1,315		5.6%
U.S. Decennial Census; 1850–1900 1910; 1920 1930 1940; 1950 1960 1970; 1980 1990 2000; 2010

=== 2020 census ===
As of the 2020 census, Old River-Winfree had a population of 1,315, 455 households, and 384 families. The median age was 35.9 years; 28.4% of residents were under the age of 18 and 15.5% of residents were 65 years of age or older. For every 100 females there were 97.2 males, and for every 100 females age 18 and over there were 100.4 males age 18 and over.

0.0% of residents lived in urban areas, while 100.0% lived in rural areas.

Of those 455 households, 43.5% had children under the age of 18 living in them. Of all households, 53.4% were married-couple households, 18.5% were households with a male householder and no spouse or partner present, and 18.7% were households with a female householder and no spouse or partner present. About 15.7% of all households were made up of individuals and 7.1% had someone living alone who was 65 years of age or older.

There were 495 housing units, of which 8.1% were vacant. The homeowner vacancy rate was 0.5% and the rental vacancy rate was 14.4%.

Racial composition as of the 2020 census
Race	Number	Percent
White	1,038	78.9%
Black or African American	51	3.9%
American Indian and Alaska Native	9	0.7%
Asian	5	0.4%
Native Hawaiian and Other Pacific Islander	0	0.0%
Some other race	77	5.9%
Two or more races	135	10.3%
Hispanic or Latino (of any race)	227	17.3%

=== 2000 census ===
As of the census of 2000, there were 1,364 people, 475 households, and 397 families residing in the city. The population density was 1,086.5 inhabitants per square mile (419.5/km^{2}). There were 527 housing units at an average density of 419.8 per square mile (162.1/km^{2}). The racial makeup of the city was 92.60% White, 4.25% African American, 0.37% Native American, 0.07% Asian, 1.32% from other races, and 1.39% from two or more races. Hispanic or Latino of any race were 5.28% of the population.

There were 475 households, out of which 42.5% had children under the age of 18 living with them, 69.1% were married couples living together, 8.8% had a female householder with no husband present, and 16.4% were non-families. 14.3% of all households were made up of individuals, and 4.0% had someone living alone who was 65 years of age or older. The average household size was 2.87 and the average family size was 3.12.

In the city, the population was spread out, with 29.2% under the age of 18, 8.1% from 18 to 24, 30.4% from 25 to 44, 26.4% from 45 to 64, and 6.0% who were 65 years of age or older. The median age was 36 years. For every 100 females, there were 99.4 males. For every 100 females age 18 and over, there were 100.8 males.

The median income for a household in the city was $48,523, and the median income for a family was $52,857. Males had a median income of $43,182 versus $25,313 for females. The per capita income for the city was $19,114. About 4.9% of families and 6.9% of the population were below the poverty line, including 5.3% of those under age 18 and 11.5% of those age 65 or over.

== Education ==
The portion of Old River-Winfree in Chambers County is served by Barbers Hill Independent School District. The portion in Liberty County is zoned to Dayton Independent School District.

Residents of Barbers Hill ISD and Dayton ISD are zoned to Lee College.
