= Daisetta, Texas =

- City

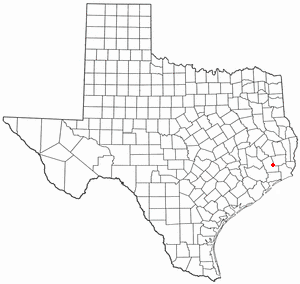
- Location of Daisetta, Texas

- Coordinates: 30°06′49″N 94°38′33″W
- Country: United States
- State: Texas
- County: Liberty

Area
  - Total: 1.48 sq mi (3.84 km^{2})
  - Land: 1.48 sq mi (3.83 km^{2})
  - Water: 0 sq mi (0.00 km^{2})
- Elevation: 79 ft (24 m)

Population (2020)
  - Total: 923
  - Density: 759/sq mi (293.2/km^{2})
- Time zone: UTC-6 (Central (CST))
  - Summer (DST): UTC-5 (CDT)
- ZIP code: 77533
- Area code: 936
- FIPS code: 48-18476
- GNIS feature ID: 2410285
- Website: cityofdaisetta.com

Daisetta is a city in Liberty County, Texas, United States. The population was 923 at the 2020 census.

== History ==
The city was named after residents Daisy Barrett and Etta White.

== Geography ==
According to the United States Census Bureau, the city has a total area of 1.5 square miles (3.9 km^{2}), all land.

=== Geology ===
Daisetta sits on a salt dome. In 1969, 1981, and again in 2008, sinkholes formed in the area. The 1981 sinkhole, which grew out of the smaller 1969 sinkhole, is thought to have formed from a collapse in the salt dome and is now a lake. The cause of the 2008 sinkhole is not yet known, but a collapse in the salt dome that Daisetta sits on is thought to be the cause and suspected to be caused by a company drilling oil out of the area. The 1981 sinkhole grew to 250 feet (76 m) wide and 30 feet (9.1 m) deep. By the evening of the day after the 2008 sinkhole formed, its growth had stabilized, but officials still saw it as a potential risk to the safety of city residents. With its length of 600 by 525 feet (183 m × 160 m) and maximum depth of 150 feet (46 m), it was nicknamed the "Sinkhole de Mayo" by local residents (a pun on "Cinco de Mayo"). In 2023, another sinkhole formed next to the larger 2008 sinkhole.

== Demographics ==
Historical population
Census	Pop.	Note	%±
1970	1,084		—
1980	1,177		8.6%
1990	969		−17.7%
2000	1,034		6.7%
2010	966		−6.6%
2020	923		−4.5%
U.S. Decennial Census; 1850–1900 1910; 1920 1930 1940; 1950 1960 1970; 1980 1990 2000; 2010

=== 2020 census ===
As of the 2020 census, there were 923 people, 316 households, and 269 families residing in Daisetta, and the median age was 33.8 years.

30.6% of residents were under the age of 18 and 12.6% of residents were 65 years of age or older; for every 100 females there were 89.1 males, and for every 100 females age 18 and over there were 86.9 males age 18 and over.

0.0% of residents lived in urban areas, while 100.0% lived in rural areas.

There were 316 households in Daisetta, of which 42.1% had children under the age of 18 living in them. Of all households, 47.2% were married-couple households, 16.5% were households with a male householder and no spouse or partner present, and 28.5% were households with a female householder and no spouse or partner present. About 22.4% of all households were made up of individuals and 10.7% had someone living alone who was 65 years of age or older.

There were 364 housing units, of which 13.2% were vacant. The homeowner vacancy rate was 2.6% and the rental vacancy rate was 8.8%.

Racial composition as of the 2020 census
Race	Number	Percent
White	788	85.4%
Black or African American	34	3.7%
American Indian and Alaska Native	6	0.7%
Asian	2	0.2%
Native Hawaiian and Other Pacific Islander	1	0.1%
Some other race	24	2.6%
Two or more races	68	7.4%
Hispanic or Latino (of any race)	62	6.7%

=== 2010 census ===
As of 2010 Daisetta had a population of 966. The racial and ethnic makeup of the population was 91.5% white, 3.2% black or African American, 3.2% from other races and 2.1% from two or more races. 5.5% of the population was Hispanic or Latino of any race.

As of the census of 2010, there were 966 people, 369 households, and 290 families residing in the city. The population density was 701.0 inhabitants per square mile (270.7/km^{2}). There were 413 housing units at an average density of 280.0 per square mile (108.1/km^{2}). The racial makeup of the city was 95.55% White, 2.32% African American, 1.16% from other races, and 0.97% from two or more races. Hispanic or Latino of any race were 2.13% of the population.

There were 369 households, out of which 39.6% had children under the age of 18 living with them, 61.8% were married couples living together, 13.6% had a female householder with no husband present, and 21.4% were non-families. 19.5% of all households were made up of individuals, and 11.4% had someone living alone who was 65 years of age or older. The average household size was 2.80 and the average family size was 3.23.

In the city, the population was spread out, with 29.9% under the age of 18, 8.5% from 18 to 24, 29.4% from 25 to 44, 19.7% from 45 to 64, and 12.5% who were 65 years of age or older. The median age was 33 years. For every 100 females, there were 98.1 males. For every 100 females age 18 and over, there were 92.3 males.

The median income for a household in the city was US$28,173, and the median income for a family was $33,281. Males had a median income of $30,529 versus $17,396 for females. The per capita income for the city was $12,969. About 14.7% of families and 14.5% of the population were below the poverty line, including 15.9% of those under age 18 and 19.0% of those age 65 or over.

== Education ==
The City of Daisetta is served by the Hull-Daisetta Independent School District, and is home to the Hull-Daisetta High School Bobcats.

Residents of Hull-Daisetta ISD are zoned to Lee College.

== Notable people ==
- Oscar Griffin, Jr., journalist, was born in Daisetta

== See also ==
- List of sinkholes of the United States
