= Sonora, Texas =

- City
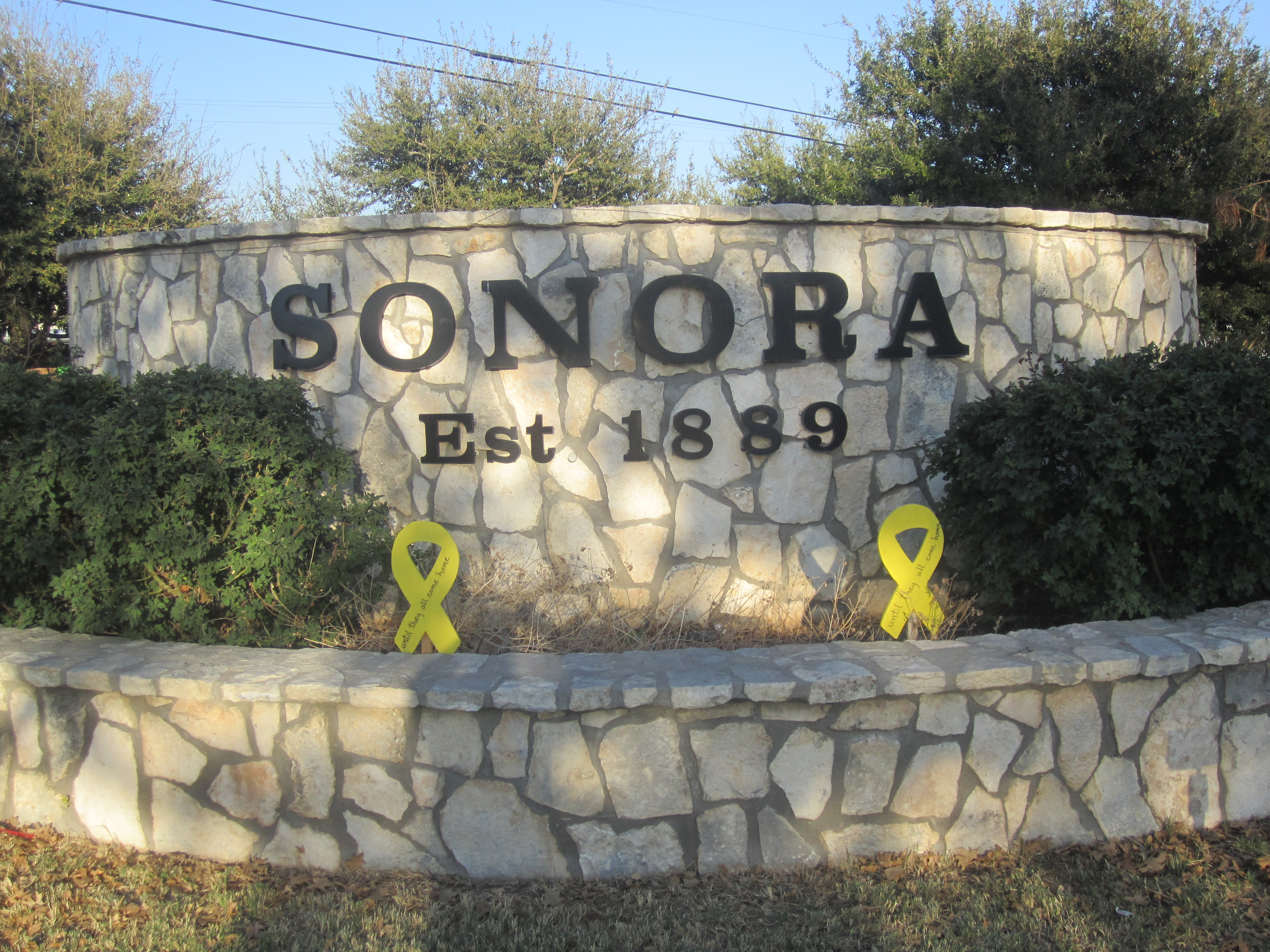
- Sonora entrance sign
- Nickname: "Home of the Caverns of Sonora"
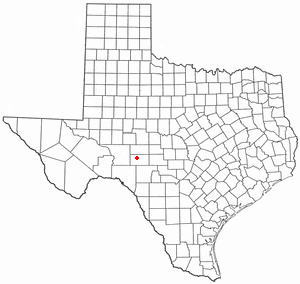
- Location in the state of Texas

- Coordinates: 30°34′5″N 100°38′39″W
- Country: United States
- State: Texas
- County: Sutton

Government
  - Mayor: Wanda Shurley

Area
  - Total: 2.22 sq mi (5.75 km^{2})
  - Land: 2.22 sq mi (5.75 km^{2})
  - Water: 0 sq mi (0.00 km^{2})
- Elevation: 2,129 ft (649 m)

Population (2020)
  - Total: 2,502
  - Density: 1,130/sq mi (435/km^{2})
- Time zone: UTC-6 (CST)
  - Summer (DST): UTC-5 (CDT)
- ZIP code: 76950
- Area code: Area code 325
- FIPS code: 48-68756
- GNIS feature ID: 1368606
- Website: sonoratexas.gov

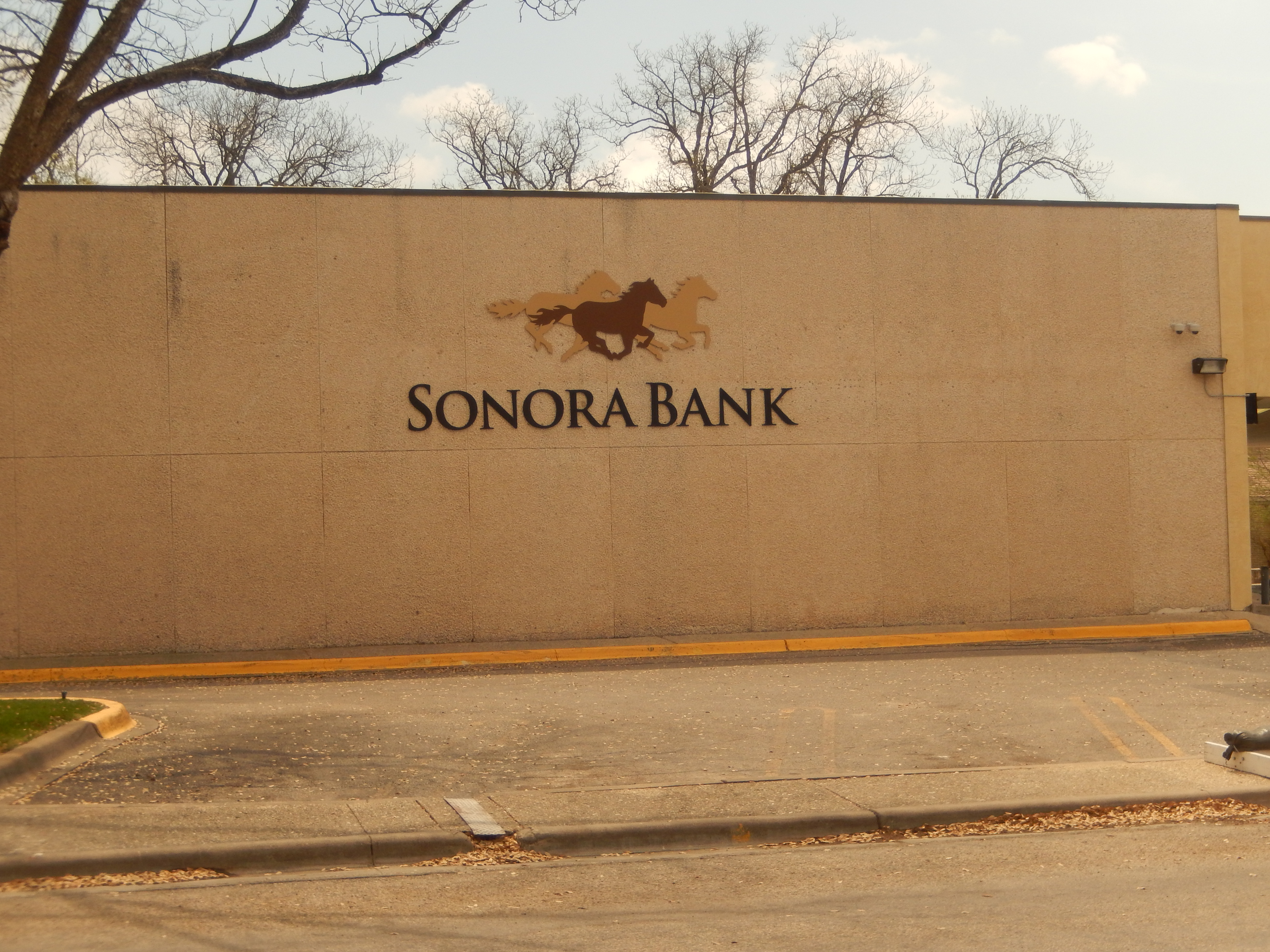
Sonora Bank at 102 E. Main St. in Sonora

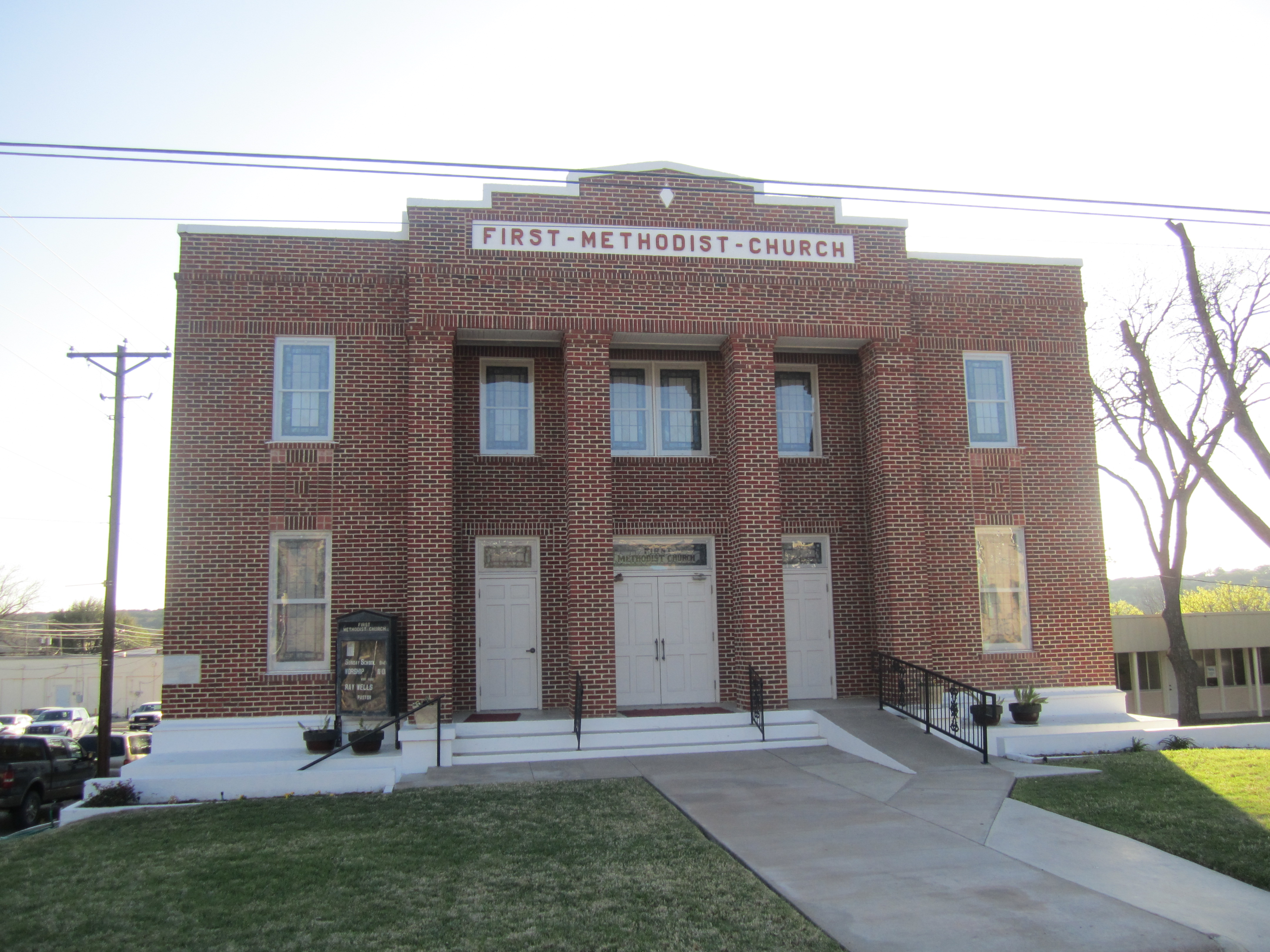
First Methodist Church of Sonora

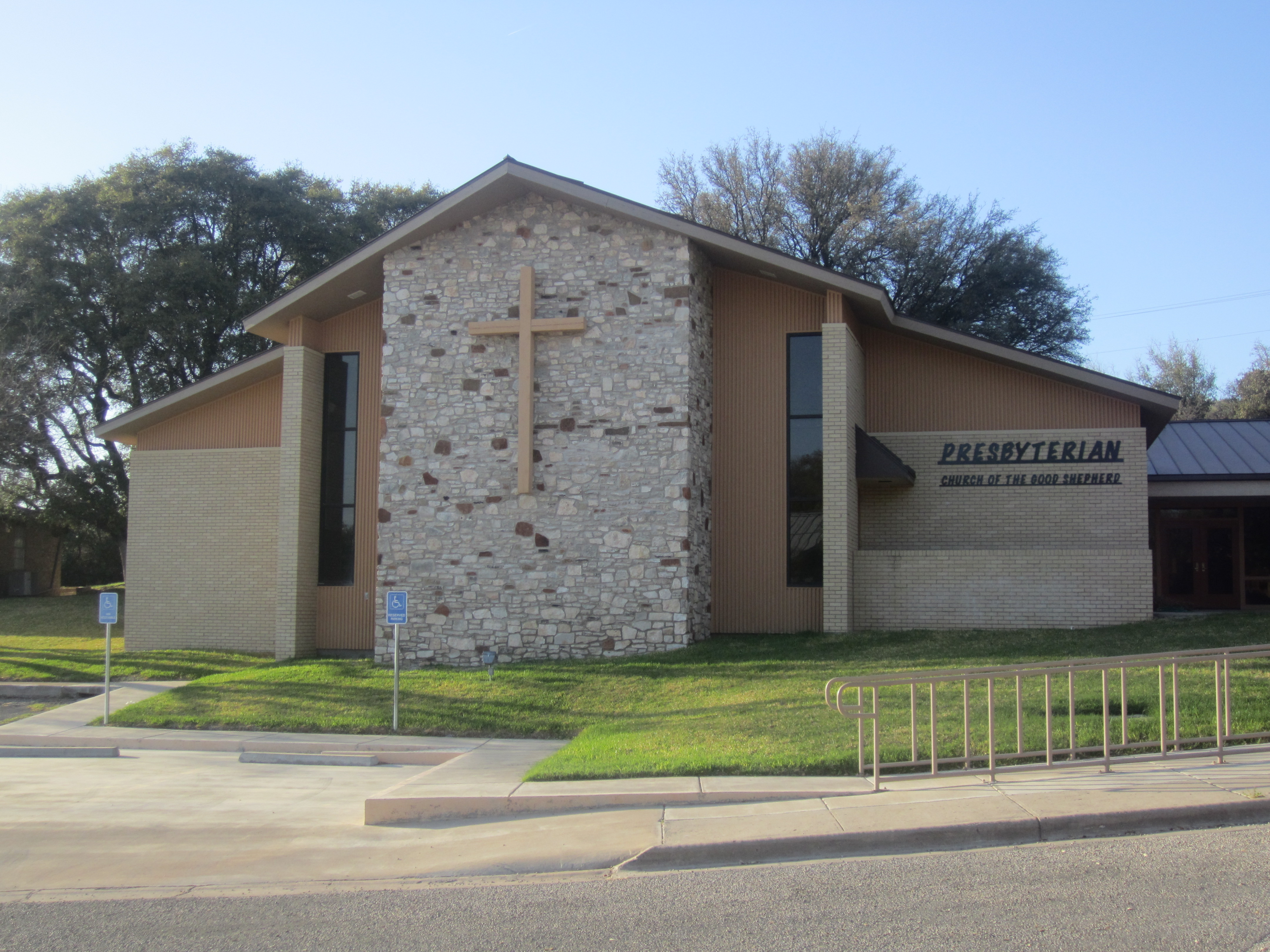
Presbyterian Church of the Good Shepherd in Sonora

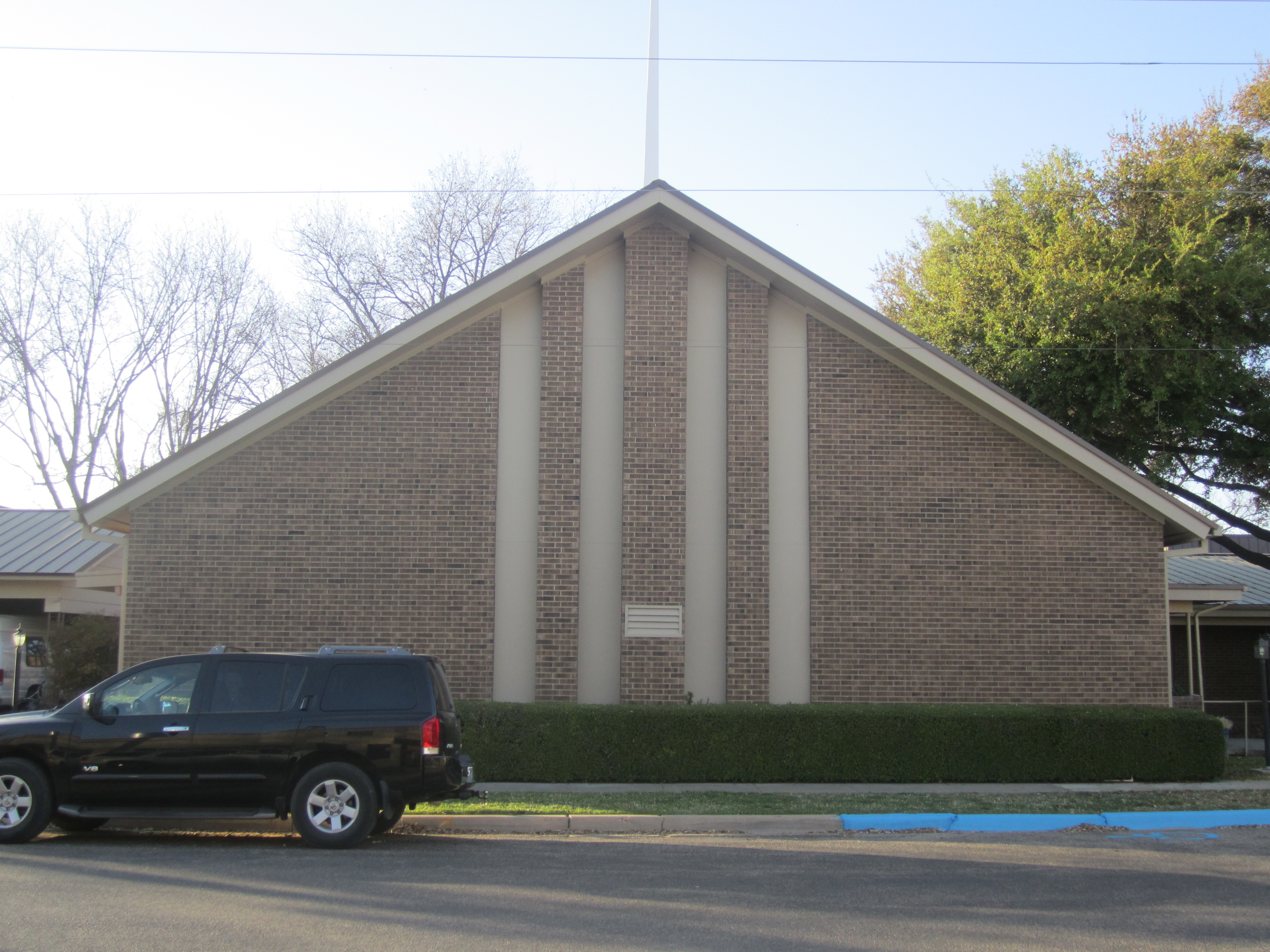
First Baptist Church Fellowship Hall in Sonora is named for J. C. Hancock, the pastor there from 1968 to 1983.

Sonora is a city in and the county seat of Sutton County, Texas, United States. The population was 2,502 at the 2020 census.

== Geography and climate ==
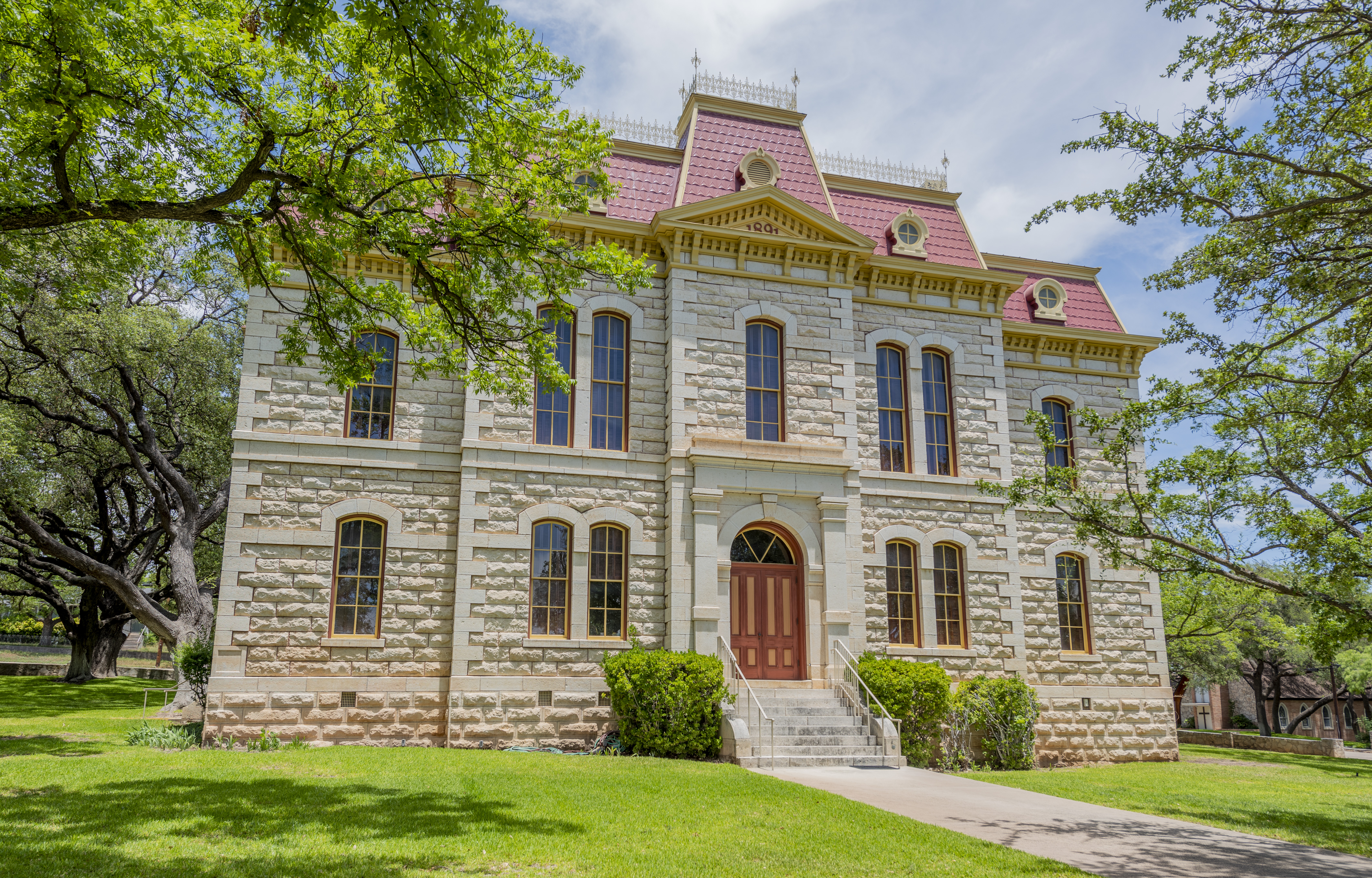
The Sutton County Courthouse is perched on a hill overlooking Sonora.

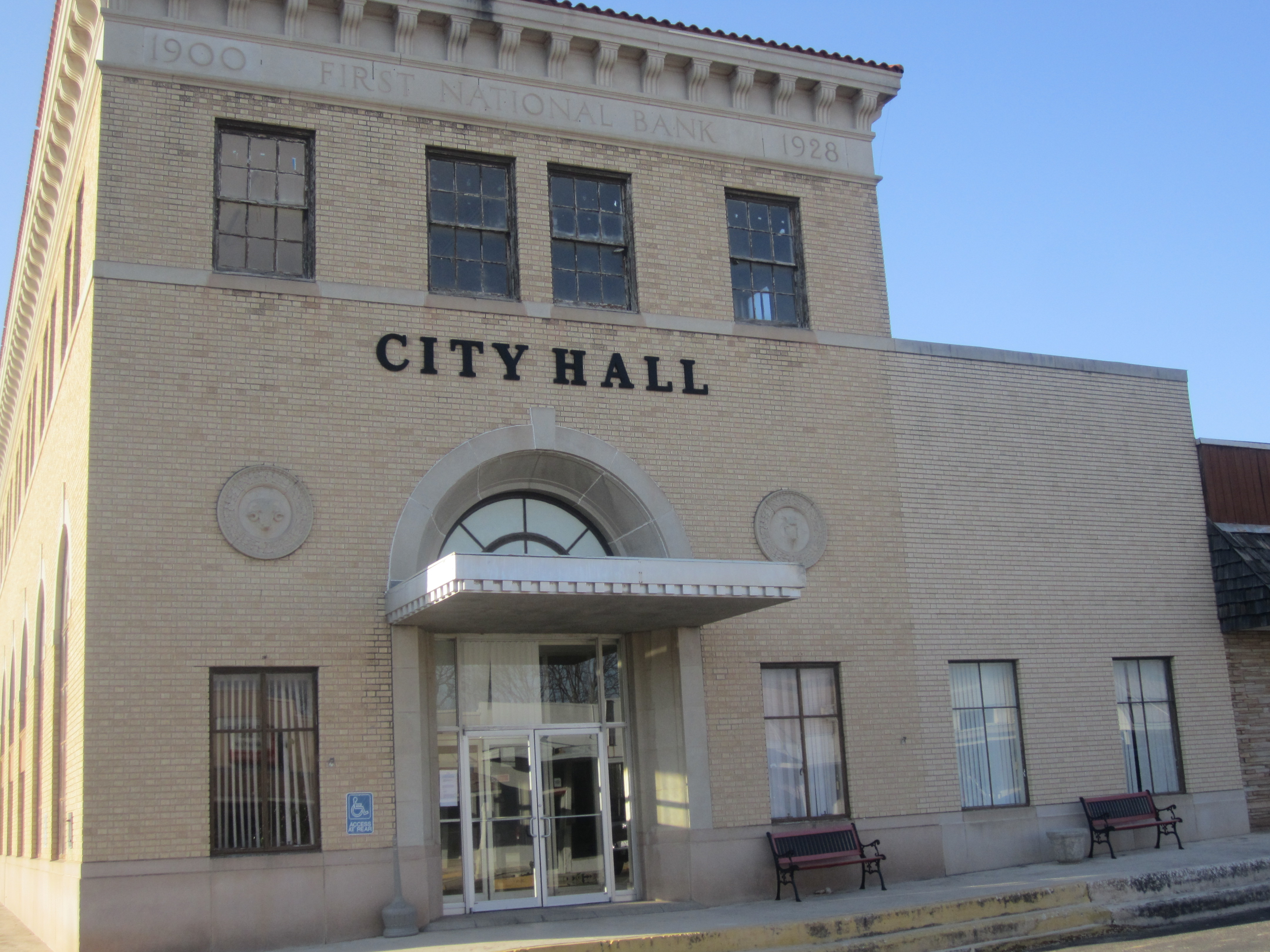
Sonora City Hall

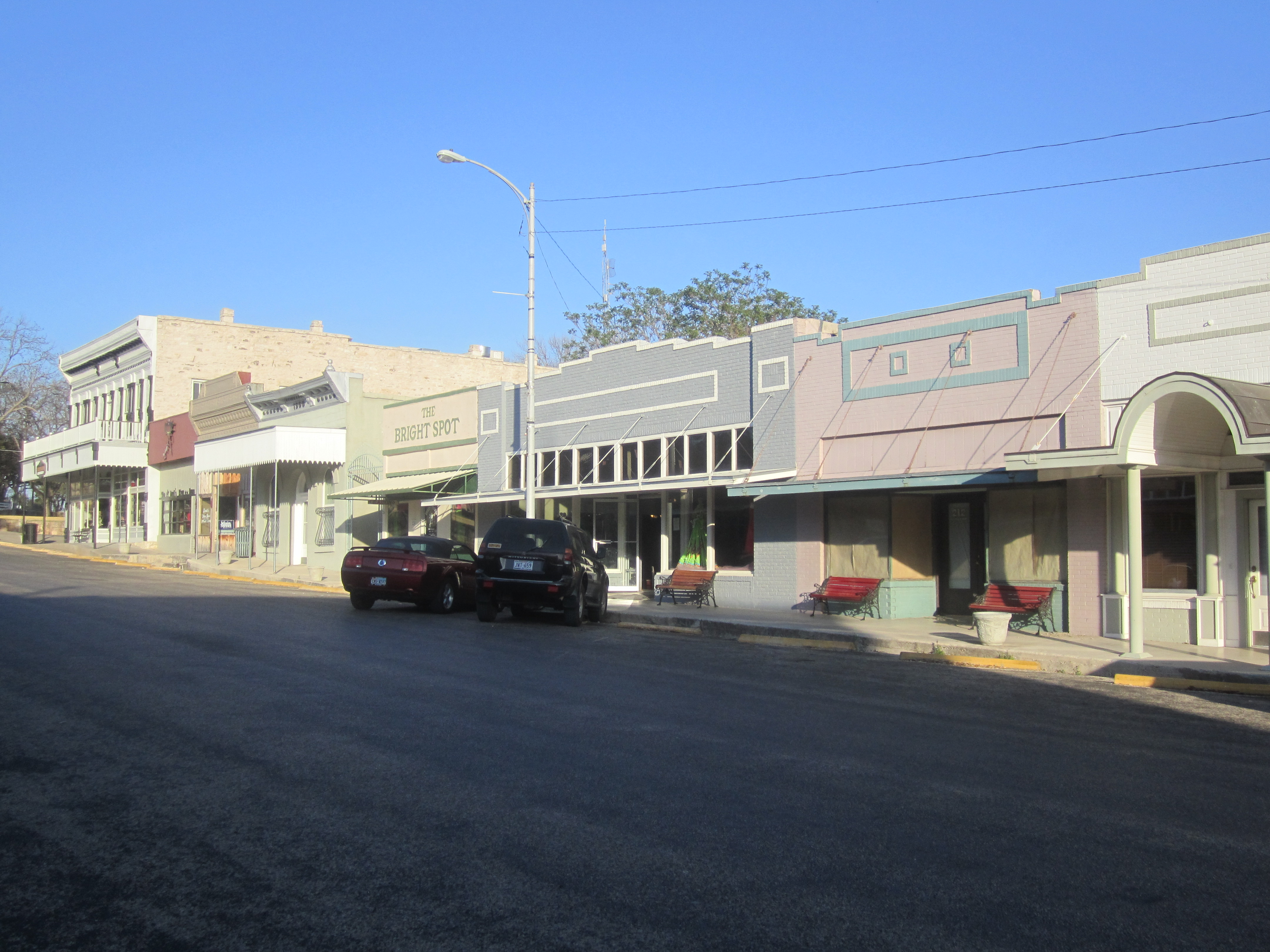
A glimpse of the eastern side of downtown Sonora

Sonora is located at 30°34′5″N 100°38′39″W (30.568166, –100.644163).

According to the United States Census Bureau, the city has a total area of 2.0 square miles (5.1 km^{2}), all land.

The area lies in west Texas, bordering the Texas Hill Country on the east. It is a region of limestone outcrops and rolling terrain dotted with areas of mostly smaller, clump-forming or mottes of live oaks (Quercus fusiformis) and juniper (Juniperus ashei), as an open savanna grading into a closed savanna or woodland to the east, alternating with a blend of various grasses, shrubs, and cacti.

Sonora's climate is semi-arid, warm temperate but humid continental, though periods of long drought are not uncommon due to the influence of deserts to the west. The upland location allows some of the periodic Gulf of Mexico moisture to interact with frontal systems and elevated terrain, to create more clouds and precipitation than locations in the brush country to the south, or drier areas to the west and northwest. Thunderstorms with heavy rainfall are most frequent during spring and fall months, though some lighter, steady precipitation and low clouds can occur during the winter, due in large part to frontal systems originating on the plains and prairies to the north.

Summers are long and hot, often with higher humidity, though a breeze often moderates the heat. Fall through spring months are often pleasant, though winter can experience brief periods of cold or cloudy weather.

== Demographics ==
Historical population
Census	Pop.	Note	%±
1920	1,009		—
1930	1,942		92.5%
1940	2,528		30.2%
1950	2,633		4.2%
1960	2,619		−0.5%
1970	2,149		−17.9%
1980	3,856		79.4%
1990	2,751		−28.7%
2000	2,924		6.3%
2010	3,027		3.5%
2020	2,502		−17.3%
U.S. Decennial Census

=== 2020 census ===
As of the 2020 census, Sonora had a population of 2,502, 983 households, and 799 families residing in the city. The median age was 40.9 years.

26.7% of residents were under the age of 18 and 18.1% of residents were 65 years of age or older. For every 100 females there were 99.8 males, and for every 100 females age 18 and over there were 93.7 males age 18 and over.

0.0% of residents lived in urban areas, while 100.0% lived in rural areas.

There were 983 households in Sonora, of which 35.6% had children under the age of 18 living in them. Of all households, 48.3% were married-couple households, 21.7% were households with a male householder and no spouse or partner present, and 26.8% were households with a female householder and no spouse or partner present. About 30.5% of all households were made up of individuals and 14.8% had someone living alone who was 65 years of age or older.

There were 1,280 housing units, of which 23.2% were vacant. The homeowner vacancy rate was 3.8% and the rental vacancy rate was 26.8%.

Racial composition as of the 2020 census
Race	Number	Percent
White	1,403	56.1%
Black or African American	10	0.4%
American Indian and Alaska Native	10	0.4%
Asian	5	0.2%
Native Hawaiian and Other Pacific Islander	2	0.1%
Some other race	422	16.9%
Two or more races	650	26.0%
Hispanic or Latino (of any race)	1,658	66.3%

=== 2000 census ===
As of the census of 2000, 2,924 people, 1,043 households, and 808 families resided in the city. The population density was 1,488.8 inhabitants per square mile (574.8/km^{2}). There were 1,264 housing units at an average density of 643.6 per square mile (248.5/km^{2}). The racial makeup of the city was 74.18% White, 0.34% African American, 0.34% Native American, 0.24% Asian, 23.36% from other races, and 1.54% from two or more races. Hispanics or Latinos of any race were 53.35% of the population.

Of the 1,043 households, 42.9% had children under the age of 18 living with them, 64.0% were married couples living together, 8.5% had a female householder with no husband present, and 22.5% were not families. About 20.6% of all households were made up of individuals, and 8.5% had someone living alone who was 65 years of age or older. The average household size was 2.77 and the average family size was 3.23.

In the city, the population was distributed as 31.1% under the age of 18, 7.4% from 18 to 24, 28.7% from 25 to 44, 22.2% from 45 to 64, and 10.7% who were 65 years of age or older. The median age was 34 years. For every 100 females, there were 98.8 males. For every 100 females age 18 and over, there were 95.2 males.

The median income for a household in the city was $36,272, and for a family was $38,106. Males had a median income of $31,728 versus $17,935 for females. The per capita income for the city was $16,128. About 13.0% of families and 16.7% of the population were below the poverty line, including 23.9% of those under age 18 and 11.2% of those age 65 or over.

== Local government ==
The city government of Sonora uses the aldermanic form of government. It is led by an elected mayor and four other council members.

As of February 24, 2016 the mayor of Sonora was Wanda Shurley and the four council members were Doug Chandler, Todd Munn, Jeremy Dawson, and Terri Johnson. The Sonora police department is headed by Chief Matthew Routh.

== Education ==
The City of Sonora is served by the Sonora Independent School District. Sonora exhibits a proud tradition of both academic and athletic success in its long history. The Sonora High School Broncos have won the most football state championships in their division (2A) with five, the most recent having been won in 2000 against the Blanco Panthers.

The latest championship team was coached by Jason Herring. 2000 was the first of two State Championships for him, his second coming in 2011 (beating the Broncos on the way there) with the Refugio Bobcats.

Sutton County is in the service area of Howard County Junior College District.

== History ==
On the night of April 2, 1901, William Carver, a member of Butch Cassidy's Wild Bunch, was shot and killed in Jack Owen's Bakery by Sheriff E.S. Briant and his deputies. Briant was trying to arrest Carver on suspicion of the murder of Oliver Thornton in Concho County.

== Notable people ==
- Dan Blocker, who portrayed "Hoss" on Bonanza, was a high-school English and drama teacher in Sonora before he was cast in the NBC western television series
- Bill Ratliff, Former State Senator and Lieutenant Governor of Mount Pleasant was reared in Sonora and graduated from high school there
- Jack Taylor, a mayor of Mesa, Arizona, who served in both houses of the Arizona State Legislature, was born in Sonora in 1907

== Attractions ==
- Caverns of Sonora: approximately eight miles to the west
- Eaton Hill Nature Center: interpretive exhibits and over three miles of hiking trails.
- Miers House Museum: restored 1890s Victorian home.
- Old Sonora Ice House Ranch Museum, a museum focused on the legacy of Will Carver.
