= Devers Independent School District =

School district in Texas, United States

Address
- 201 South Chism Street Devers, Texas, 77538; United States

District information
- Type: Public
- Grades: PK–8
- Schools: 2
- NCES District ID: 4816920

Students and staff
- Students: 185 (2023–2024)
- Teachers: 12.51 (on an FTE basis) (2023–2024)
- Staff: 12.75 (on an FTE basis) (2023–2024)
- Student–teacher ratio: 14.79 (2023–2024)

Other information
- Website: www.deversisd.net

Devers Independent School District is a public school district based in Devers, Texas (USA).

The district has two campuses: Devers Elementary (Grades PK-5) and Devers Junior High (Grades 6-8).

Most high school students attend Liberty High in the neighboring Liberty Independent School District, while others attend Hull-Daisetta High in the Hull-Daisetta Independent School District.

In 2009 and 2010 the school district was rated "Exemplary" by the Texas Education Agency.

== History ==
The district changed to a four-day school week in fall 2019.

== Controversy ==
In July 2024, the ACLU of Texas sent Devers Independent School District a letter, alleging that the district's 2023-2024 dress and grooming code appeared to violate the Texas CROWN Act, a state law which prohibits racial discrimination based on hair texture or styles, and asking the district to revise its policies for the 2024-2025 school year.
