= Barbers Hill Independent School District =

Public school district in Texas, USA

Location
- Mont Belvieu, Texas ESC Region 6 USA
- Coordinates: 29°50′10″N 94°50′56″W

District information
- Type: Independent school district
- Grades: PK–12
- Schools: 9
- NCES District ID: 4809450

Students and staff
- Students: 7,723 (2023–2024)
- Teachers: 579.44 (on an FTE basis)
- Student–teacher ratio: 13.33:1
- Athletic conference: UIL Class 5A Football & Basketball
- District mascot: Eagles
- Colors: Royal Blue, White

Other information
- TEA District Accountability Rating for 2011: Recognized
- Website: www.bhisd.net

Barbers Hill Independent School District is an independent, public school district in Mont Belvieu, Texas. The district was formed in 1929 by consolidating several school districts into the Barbers Hill Common School District which was formed in 1885 to include the first free public school in the area.

== History ==
=== Formation and early history ===
Barbers Hill Independent School District (BHISD) gets its name from an area, now part of Mont Belvieu, Texas, where Amos Joshua Barber, Sr. (1814–1885) acquired 100 acres (40 ha) in Chambers County in 1849 and built a house on "the hill" – a salt dome which became known as Barbers Hill. In 1877, Barber donated land for a school which was built by residents of the community including members of the Barber family. The school became part of the Barbers Hill Common School District which was formed in 1885 as a free public school system. Its original school building was destroyed in a fire in 1915 but another building measuring 30 by 40 feet (9.1 m × 12.2 m) was built on the same site and had a single teacher.

In the early 20th century, enrollment in the school district increased with the boom in oil excavation in the area. The Barbers Hill oil field began production in September 1918 and significantly expanded in 1928 and peaked in 1933. The school district had an enrollment of 88 students in 1926. By 1930, the school system had 484 students and 11 teachers. BHISD was officially formed as an independent school district in 1929 with the consolidation of the Common School Districts No. 10 and No. 11, along with students from Winfree. In subsequent years, several other schools in Chambers County were consolidated into the district. In the next few years, the school district had enough cash on hand from taxes and other revenue sources, without issuing bonds, to remodel buildings for its elementary school and construct new school facilities. The school district experienced a decline in finances and a plateau in enrollment during World War II but began to grow again during the post-war period.

=== Late 20th century ===
By 1952, the school district served an area covering 89 square miles (230 km^{2}) including Mont Belvieu, Winfree, West Bay, and Cove. During segregation, black students in the district were bused to the neighboring Dayton with as many as 60 students bussed as of 1952. At the same time, BHISD had an enrollment of 325 students and there were 20 teachers in the district which operated with an annual budget of $125,000.

In 1955, the school district discovered that the high school, at the time located on the same land donated by Barber in 1877, was on a fault which was causing a crack in the building. The crack was repaired but resurfaced in 1962 at which point construction was begun on a high school building on a new 75-acre site north of Interstate 10 and centrally located in the district. In the 1960s, enrollment in the school district was at 500 students. Barbers Hill High School alone had 173 students as of 1967. The new high school facility which was completed in 1968 included 14 classrooms, a gymnasium, auditorium, and an athletic facility and had a capacity of 450 students.

During the 1960s and 1970s, while the district suffered loss of tax revenue due to oil and mineral depletion, new industries had developed in the area ensuring a healthy budget for the district. The school district, which raises revenue from property tax, had a valuation of $42.8 million as of 1968–1969 and levied a tax rate of $1.56 per $100 allowing it to budget for $730,458 in expenses. The school district also issued a $1.5-million bond to raise funds for the construction of the new high school. With the opening of the new high school, the old school buildings served as the facilities for middle school. In August 1975, a new elementary school facility was opened, and the middle school was moved there to allow for demolition of the old building located on a fault on the original site on Barbers Hill.

=== Recent history ===
The Mont Belvieu area has continued to grow, requiring significant expansion of the school facilities and operations. In 2005, there was a referendum to raise funds for construction of a new elementary campus, expansion of the high school, renovation of an intermediate school campus, expansion of the school district's administration building, and other improvements to its operations including funding its student laptop program for middle school students. The referendums proposed raising $43.8 million through issuance of bonds which could lead to an estimated increase property taxes by $26 per $100,000 in 2006 and $13 per $100,000 in 2007 and 2008. BHISD had 3,719 students in 2007 and 3,897 students in 2008. In 2009, the school district was rated "recognized" by the Texas Education Agency.

As of 2015, BHISD had a total enrollment of 5,008 students on eight campuses and had a population that was 73% White, 21% Hispanic, 3% African American, and 3% other. In January 2020, school authorities suspended DeAndre Arnold, an African American senior at Barbers Hill, due to the length of his hair. The district had altered its dress code over winter break, prohibiting boys from wearing their hair in a ponytail. Arnold's hairstyle is an homage to his Trinidadian roots. All of the board members voted in July 2020 to uphold the prohibition on long hair for male students. In August 2020, a federal judge ruled that the school district's hair policy was discriminatory and could not be enforced. Despite the ruling and the subsequent adoption of the CROWN Act, the district continued to enforce variations of the dress code until at least 2023.

In 2024, Barbers Hill ISD began encouraging teachers to use the artificial intelligence (AI) platform Brisk Teaching in their classroom instruction and administrative tasks. The school district spent $25,125 on the platform in 2024 and planned to spend $41,700 on an upgrade for the subsequent year. According to Barbers Hill ISD, the tool is intended to reduce the teacher workload and prevent teacher burnout by helping them create assignments, track student performance, and customize lesson plans to particular students.

In 2025, entered into an agreement to bring a branch of Lee College, a two-year college located in neighboring Baytown, to Mont Belvieu on a new campus owned and operated by BHISD due to open in 2027. The school district will reimburse the college for the cost of operating the branch which will be used for dual credit between BHISD and Lee College.

== Composition ==
The district serves 192.3 square miles (498 km^{2}) of exurbs in western Chambers County, Texas, and is located at the intersection of Interstate 10 and State Highway 146. The area is composed of four distinct communities: Mont Belvieu, Old River-Winfree, Cove, and Beach City.

As of 2017, Barbers Hill ISD has a total of 11 schools.

=== Regular instructional ===
High school

- Barbers Hill High School (9–12)

Middle schools

- Barbers Hill Middle School North (6–8)
- Barbers Hill Middle School South (6-8)

Intermediate schools

- Barbers Hill Intermediate School North (4-6)
- Barbers Hill Intermediate School South (4-6)

Elementary schools

- Barbers Hill Elementary School North (2-4)
- Barbers Hill Elementary School South (2-4)
- Barbers Hill Early Childhood Center (PreK-1)

=== Alternative instructional ===
- Hardin Chambers Alternative
- Alternative School
- Adaptive Behavioral Unit
- Barbers Hill DAEP/EPIC (Disciplinary Alternative Education Program/Eagle Positive Intervention Center)

== Sources ==
- Otto, Sarah (December 2017). Defining a Tradition of Excellence by Any Measure: A Phenomenological Study of a Texas School District (PhD thesis). Faculty of the College of Education University of Houston. Archived from the original on March 8, 2026.
