= Oscar Griffin Jr. =

American journalist (1933–2011)

- Born: Oscar O'Neal Griffin Jr. April 28, 1933; Daisetta, Texas, U.S.
- Died: November 23, 2011 (aged 78); New Waverly, Texas, U.S.
- Education: Liberty (TX) High School 1950; University of Texas at Austin, Bachelor of Journalism 1958; Harvard Business School, OPM 6 1982
- Occupation: journalist
- Spouse: Patricia Lamb Griffin (1955-2011 his death)
- Children: 4
- Awards: 1963 Pulitzer Prize
- Military career
- Allegiance: United States
- Branch: U.S. Army
- Service years: 1953-1955

Oscar O'Neal Griffin Jr. (April 28, 1933 – November 23, 2011) was an American journalist.

== Early life and education ==
Griffin was born in Daisetta, Texas, and obtained his degree from the University of Texas in 1958. In 1982, he completed Harvard Business School's executive education program for Owner/President Management (OPM).

== Career ==
Griffin was the editor of the Pecos Independent and Enterprise. During his time here, he was a reporter and editor. Prior to that time, he served in the Army in the 1950s. After graduating from the University of Texas, he worked at a number of small newspapers before his stint at the Pecos, Texas Independent and Enterprise. In 1962, he began working for the Houston Chronicle, where he was responsible for covering the Kennedy and Johnson administrations.

Griffin was assistant director of Public Affairs for the U.S. Department of Transportation in Washington, D.C. (1969-1974.) After coming back to Texas, he founded Griffin Well Service, an oil company in El Campo.

== Awards and honors ==
Griffin won the 1963 Pulitzer Prize for Local Reporting (No Edition Time), as editor at the Independent and Enterprise, for directing its investigation of the fraud scandal involving Billie Sol Estes in 1962.

== Family ==
Griffin was married to the former Patricia Lamb for 56 years. Together they had three daughters and a son: Gwendolyn Pryor, Amanda Ward, Marguerite Horne, and Gregory Griffin. They also had seven grandchildren.

== Death ==
Griffin died in New Waverly, Texas, where he lived, on November 23, 2011, at the age of 78, of cancer.

== Publications ==
- Benavidez, Roy P.; Griffin, Oscar (1986). The three wars of Roy Benavidez. San Antonio, Texas: Corona Pub. Co. ISBN 0931722586. LCCN 86070715.
