= Sonora High School (Texas) =

Location
- 1717 Tayloe; Sonora, Texas 76950-3999; United States; 30.5567°N 100.6371°W

Information
- School type: Public high school
- School district: Sonora Independent School District
- Principal: mrs. Rodriguez
- Teaching staff: 32.88 (FTE)
- Grades: 9-12
- Enrollment: 299 (2022-2023)
- Student to teacher ratio: 9.09
- Colors: Red, black, and white
- Athletics conference: UIL Class 2A
- Mascot: Rowdy The Bronco and Cody the colt
- Website: Sonora High School website

Sonora High School is a public high school located in Sonora, Texas and classified as 2A school by the UIL. It is part of the Sonora Independent School District which covers all of Sutton County. In 2013, the school was rated "Met Standard" by the Texas Education Agency.

== Athletics ==
The Sonora Broncos compete in the following sports

Cross Country, Volleyball, Football, Basketball, Golf, Powerlifting, Tennis, Track, Baseball & Softball

=== State Titles ===
- Boys Golf
  - 2025 (2A)
- Boys Track
  - 1973(1A)
- Football
  - 1966(1A), 1968(1A), 1970(1A), 1971(1A)^, 2000(2A)
- Girls Golf
  - 2012 (2A), 2014 (3A), 2015 (3A), 2016 (3A), 2017 (3A)
- One Act Play
  - 2006 Unexpected Tenderness (2A)
  - 1993 The Marriage of Bette and Boo (3A)
  - 1973 The Apollo of Bellac (1A)
  - 1971 The Mad Woman of Chaillot (1A)

^ Score ended in tie - were co-champions with Barbers Hill High School of Mont Belvieu, TX

== Notable alumni ==
- Bill Ratliff
