= Beach City, Texas =

- City
- Interactive map of Beach City, Texas
- Coordinates: 29°42′9″N 94°51′46″W
- Country: United States
- State: Texas
- County: Chambers

Area
  - Total: 4.48 sq mi (11.60 km^{2})
  - Land: 4.48 sq mi (11.60 km^{2})
  - Water: 0 sq mi (0.00 km^{2})
- Elevation: 26 ft (7.9 m)

Population (2020)
  - Total: 3,221
  - Density: 623/sq mi (240.7/km^{2})
- Time zone: UTC-6 (Central (CST))
  - Summer (DST): UTC-5 (CDT)
- ZIP code: 77523
- FIPS code: 48-06200
- GNIS feature ID: 2409802
- Website: www.beachcitytx.us

Beach City is a U.S. city in Chambers County, Texas, United States. The population was 3,221 at the 2020 census. It can now be considered as a part of Greater Houston.

== Geography ==
Beach City is located in western Chambers County extending for 7 miles (11 km) along the northwestern shore of Trinity Bay. The city is 9 to 10 miles (14 to 16 km) southeast by east of Baytown.

According to the United States Census Bureau, Beach City has a total area of 4.5 square miles (11.6 km^{2}), all land.

== Historical development ==
With the boom economy after World War II, people had time and money for recreation. People from Baytown especially began to take advantage of the drawbridge and built small summer/weekend houses or "fishing camps" along the shoreline of the present Beach City. By the early 1950s, they had nicknamed FM-2354 "Tri-City Beach Road", because the present Baytown resulted from a merger of three smaller towns in 1948.

However, a number who came for recreation decided to stay. By the early 1960s the community commonly called Tri-City Beach had about 500 permanent residents. At that time, the Texas legislature began to consider annexation reform. Previously, Texas municipalities had almost unfettered power to annex adjacent lands. Cities could control vast territories by annexing ten-feet-wide strips surrounding them. During that period, Baytown controlled an area larger than the California city of Los Angeles did. Larger cities could even annex smaller cities, after they had annexed to surround them. Knowing that reform was pending, many cities began a flurry of annexations. Defensively, a number of unincorporated communities began proceedings to incorporate as municipalities. The Tri-City Beach community was one of those.

On April 6, 1963, the Tri-City Beach Civic Association was formed. They met to discuss ways to better their community. The officers were Hayden Harper, a local grocer, President; Nina Harper, Secretary; Georgia Mackrell, Chairman of Publicity; and John Jennings, Chairman of the Membership Committee. The association explored a number of ideas, including the construction of a breakwater, and then began considering incorporation as a city. An Incorporation Committee was formed consisting of George Armer, Ruth Hoover, Eloice Jordan, J.D. Nicholson, and Bill White. Ms. Jordan met with County Judge Oscar F. Nelson, Jr. on March 8, 1966, and presented him with a petition for an incorporation election. On March 24, 1966, the Baytown City Council adopted Ordinance 788, consenting to the inclusion of an unspecified part of what Baytown then claimed as its extraterritorial jurisdiction within the proposed new municipality to be known as the City of Beach City. On April 5, 1966, an election was held to determine if the area would become a municipality. The results were 103 for incorporation to 4 opposed. The incorporation of Beach City was finalized by a decree issued by Judge Nelson on April 11, 1966.

To prevent annexation by the nearby city of Baytown, this community voted in April 1966 to become incorporated. An election was held on May 21, 1966, to select the first municipal officers. Eloice Jordan was elected mayor. W.D. Bush, Alvin J. Crawley, William D. Daniel, J.R. Holland, and J.D. Nicholson were chosen as aldermen for the first city council. Gus Dauzat became the first city marshal. Later Ruth Hoover was appointed by the Council as city secretary and Claude Galloway as deputy marshal.

The mayors of the city have been (by date of election):

- Eloice Jordan – April 6, 1968
- Jimmy McClellan – April 7, 1970
- Herschel Scott – April 27, 1976
- Jim Ainsworth – May, 1982
- A.R. "Rusty" Senac – April, 1986
- James Standridge – May 26, 1992
- A.R. "Rusty" Senac – May 23, 2000
- Guido Persiani – May 25, 2004
- Billy Combs – May 8, 2010

The Beach City Volunteer Fire Department was formed in 1967 and still exists. A Tri-City Beach Emergency Medical service organization had been formed before the city's incorporation and has since been merged into a county-wide emergency medical service.

With Baytown's concurrence, Beach City increased its area on August 19, 1968, by annexing approximately 1,781 acres (721 ha) near Point Barrow Road and taking in McCollum Park. The 1968 annexation moved the northern boundary of the city to Lawrence Road. This annexation brought into the city limits the historic home site of early pioneer Solomon Barrow (1801–1858), whose land included the area where McCollum Park is now located. The park, as a matter of record, contains the last resting place of Barrow, his wife Elizabeth Winfree, and Barton Clark, the first husband of their daughter Narcissa Ophelia Henrietta Jane Barrow. On October 27, 1970, again with Baytown's concurrence, Beach City annexed the area where the Beach City Community Building and the Beach City VFD fire station are located. That is the only part of the city limits that extends west of FM-2354.

Meanwhile, there were rumors that Baytown intended to annex the community of Cove. On September 22, 1970, Beach City received a petition of 84 residents of Cove to annex the community. The mayor of Beach City at the time was Jimmy McClellan. On November 24, 1970, Beach City annexed Cove, an area bounded generally on the west by FM-2354, on the east by the Old and Lost Rivers, on the south by Lawrence Road, and on the north by a line just north of FM-565. On December 2, 1970, Beach City extended its Cove annexation to include the property where the old Cove Community Building sits. This time Baytown did not concur. In 1971, Baytown sued Beach City in an attempt to stop the annexation of Cove. In 1973, Beach City released its claim to what are now the city limits of Cove. An incorporation election was held and the City of Cove was incorporated on May 23, 1973. Leroy Stevens was Cove's first mayor. The City Council of Beach City presented to Mayor Stevens Cove's first municipal seal, which is believed to be the one still in use.

== Demographics ==
Historical population
Census	Pop.	Note	%±
1970	363		—
1980	977		169.1%
1990	852		−12.8%
2000	1,645		93.1%
2010	2,198		33.6%
2020	3,221		46.5%
U.S. Decennial Census

=== 2020 census ===
As of the 2020 census, Beach City had a population of 3,221 people. The median age was 42.8 years. 23.1% of residents were under the age of 18 and 17.3% of residents were 65 years of age or older. For every 100 females there were 103.6 males, and for every 100 females age 18 and over there were 100.2 males age 18 and over.

There were 1,166 households in Beach City, of which 34.8% had children under the age of 18 living in them. Of all households, 68.0% were married-couple households, 12.8% were households with a male householder and no spouse or partner present, and 15.2% were households with a female householder and no spouse or partner present. About 15.7% of all households were made up of individuals and 8.0% had someone living alone who was 65 years of age or older.

There were 1,271 housing units, of which 8.3% were vacant. Among occupied housing units, 83.4% were owner-occupied and 16.6% were renter-occupied. The homeowner vacancy rate was 1.9% and the rental vacancy rate was 10.1%.

0% of residents lived in urban areas, while 100.0% lived in rural areas.

Racial composition as of the 2020 census
Race	Percent
White	83.5%
Black or African American	1.1%
American Indian and Alaska Native	0.4%
Asian	1.0%
Native Hawaiian and Other Pacific Islander	0%
Some other race	4.2%
Two or more races	9.7%
Hispanic or Latino (of any race)	14.7%

=== 2000 census ===
As of the census of 2000, there were 1,645 people, 623 households, and 490 families residing in the city. The population density was 370.9 inhabitants per square mile (143.2/km^{2}). There were 714 housing units at an average density of 161.0 per square mile (62.2/km^{2}). The racial makeup of the city was 95.62% White, 1.58% African American, 0.12% Native American, 0.06% Asian, 1.76% from other races, and 0.85% from two or more races. Hispanic or Latino of any race were 4.74% of the population.

There were 623 households, out of which 35.6% had children under the age of 18 living with them, 70.5% were married couples living together, 6.1% had a female householder with no husband present, and 21.2% were non-families. 16.2% of all households were made up of individuals, and 6.1% had someone living alone who was 65 years of age or older. The average household size was 2.64 and the average family size was 2.97.

In the city, the population was spread out, with 25.8% under the age of 18, 7.0% from 18 to 24, 28.0% from 25 to 44, 29.8% from 45 to 64, and 9.4% who were 65 years of age or older. The median age was 40 years. For every 100 females, there were 103.8 males. For every 100 females age 18 and over, there were 102.5 males.

The median income for a household in the city was $70,104, and the median income for a family was $75,439. Males had a median income of $55,268 versus $33,750 for females. The per capita income for the city was $28,421. About 2.8% of families and 4.0% of the population were below the poverty line, including 3.8% of those under age 18 and 0.8% of those age 65 or over.

== Transportation ==
RWJ Airpark, a privately owned, public use airport, is located in Beach City.

== Education ==
The northeastern majority of the city (north of Seacrest Park Road) is zoned to Barbers Hill Independent School District.

Zoned schools include (all in Mont Belvieu):

- Barbers Hill Kindergarten Center
- Barbers Hill Primary School
- Barbers Hill Elementary School
- Barbers Hill Intermediate School
- Barbers Hill Middle School
- Barbers Hill High School

A small southwestern part of the city (south of Seacrest Park Road) is zoned to Goose Creek Independent School District.

Zoned schools include: (all in Baytown)

- Lorenzo de Zavala Elementary School
- Horace Mann Middle School
- Lee High School

Residents of Barbers Hill ISD and Goose Creek ISD (and therefore all of Beach City) are zoned to Lee College.
