= Sonora Independent School District =

School district in Texas

Location
- Sonora, Texas; United States

District information
- Type: Public
- Superintendent: Ross Ashenbeck
- Enrollment: 990 (2008)

Other information
- Website: www.sonoraisd.net

Sonora Independent School District is a public school district based in Sonora, Texas (USA). The district's boundaries parallel that of Sutton County.

In 2009, the school district was rated "academically acceptable" by the Texas Education Agency.

== Schools ==
The district has three campuses:

- Sonora High School (Grades 9-12)
- Sonora Middle School (Grades 5-8)
- Sonora Elementary School (Grades PK-4)
