= Carl Brazell =

American football player (1917–1978)

No. 18
- Position: Running back

Personal information
- Born: July 20, 1917; Clarksville, Arkansas
- Died: May 3, 1978 (aged 60); Zanesville, Ohio
- Listed height: 5 ft 10 in (1.78 m)
- Listed weight: 195 lb (88 kg)

Career information
- High school: Mont Belvieu (TX) Barbers Hill
- College: Baylor

Career history
- Cleveland Rams (1938)
- Stats at Pro Football Reference

Carl Brazell (July 20, 1917 – May 3, 1978) was an American football running back. He played in 11 games for the Cleveland Rams in 1938.
