= Hull-Daisetta High School =

Coordinates: 30.1171°N 94.6446°W

Location
- 117 N Main, Hwy 770; Daisetta, Texas 77533-0477; United States

Information
- School type: Public High School
- School district: Hull-Daisetta Independent School District
- Principal: Kenneth J. Hayman
- Teaching staff: 14.34 (FTE)
- Grades: 9-12
- Enrollment: 101 (2023-2024)
- Student to teacher ratio: 7.04
- Colors: Red, black, and white
- Athletics conference: UIL Class AA
- Mascot: Bobcat
- Yearbook: The Bobcat
- Website: Hull-Daisetta High School

Hull-Daisetta High School is a public high school located in Daisetta, Texas (USA) and classified as a 2A school by the UIL. It is part of the Hull-Daisetta Independent School District located in southeastern Liberty County. In 2015, the school was rated "Met Standard" by the Texas Education Agency.

== Athletics ==
The Hull-Daisetta Bobcats compete in these sports -

Cross Country, Volleyball, Football, Basketball, Tennis, Track, Softball & Baseball

=== State Titles ===
- Football -
  - 1979(1A)

==== State Finalists ====
- Football -
  - 1961(1A)
