= Mont Belvieu, Texas =

- City
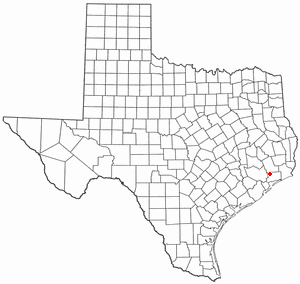
- Location of Mont Belvieu, Texas

- Coordinates: 29°51′37″N 94°52′28″W
- Country: United States
- State: Texas
- Counties: Chambers

Area
  - Total: 16.46 sq mi (42.62 km^{2})
  - Land: 16.13 sq mi (41.77 km^{2})
  - Water: 0.33 sq mi (0.85 km^{2})
- Elevation: 69 ft (21 m)

Population (2020)
  - Total: 7,654
  - Density: 407.6/sq mi (157.38/km^{2})
- Time zone: UTC-6 (Central (CST))
  - Summer (DST): UTC-5 (CDT)
- ZIP code: 77580
- Area code: 281
- FIPS code: 48-49068
- GNIS feature ID: 1341809
- Website: www.montbelvieu.net

Mont Belvieu is a city in Chambers County in the U.S. state of Texas. It is just north of Interstate 10 along State Highway 146. The population is currently 11,922 and was 7,654 at the 2020 census, an increase of nearly 100% from 3,835 in 2010. It is the site of the largest underground storage facility for liquefied petroleum gas in the US. The US LPG market pricing indicator is driven primarily by the Mont Belvieu market, and reported daily by the U.S. Energy Information Administration.

== Geography ==
Mont Belvieu is located in northwestern Chambers County at 29°51′37″N 94°52′28″W (29.860242, –94.874535). A small part of the city limits extend north into Liberty County. The city is 14 miles (23 km) northeast of Baytown via Highway 146 and 31 miles (50 km) east of Houston via Interstate 10.

According to the United States Census Bureau, Mont Belvieu has a total area of 15.3 square miles (39.7 km^{2}), of which 15.0 square miles (38.9 km^{2}) is land and 0.3 square miles (0.9 km^{2}), or 2.14%, is water.

The city is along Interstate 10 and is 30 miles (48 km) east of Downtown Houston.

== Historical development ==
The first permanent settlers to the area were Henry Griffith and his wife, Amelia Barrow, both from the Louisiana area. Henry was a cattle rancher, and at one time all of Mont Belvieu was used as pasture land for their cattle. Amos Barber became the second settler, and other settlers followed. After years of owning all of the land Griffith sold the deed to the land known today as Mont Belvieu. Henry Griffith died and was buried with no grave marker; Amelia soon followed. A memorial has been erected at the site of an old oak tree, and there is a rumor that Amelia was buried just down the hill from where their house once stood,(which now borders the Enterprise Products gas storage facility).

Growth of local industries soon proved a mixed blessing. Serious pipeline and petrochemical plant accidents happened in 1960, 1964, and 1965. A 1985 explosion at one of the plants threatened the entire salt dome on which the city was built, which had in recent years been used to store liquid petroleum gas, and led to a series of efforts by townspeople to force the petrochemical industries to buy out the homes in the immediate vicinity of their plants. By 1990 some 200 families had been bought out by a dozen petrochemical corporations. With the aid of these local industries the community was rebuilt two miles east of its 1985 location. Among the buildings at the new site were a city hall, several new churches, and the relocated Barbers Hill ISD schools. This area (Eagle Drive) is now the central core of Mont Belvieu's residential area hosting multiple subdivisions and many "mom & pop" stores. Another core was developed south of the original city along Texas State Highway 146 north of Interstate 10; this core is based mostly on commercial services for Interstate 10 travelers hosting multiple hotels, fast food restaurants, and gas stations. The two cores are connected by the city's old location (now dubbed "the hill") which consists mostly of petrochemical company offices and cement slabs of the old city.

== Demographics ==
Historical population
Census	Pop.	Note	%±
1970	1,144		—
1980	1,730		51.2%
1990	1,323		−23.5%
2000	2,324		75.7%
2010	3,835		65.0%
2020	7,654		99.6%
U.S. Decennial Census; 1850–1900 1910; 1920 1930; 1940; 1950 1960 1970; 1980 1990 2000; 2010

=== 2020 census ===
As of the 2020 census, Mont Belvieu had a population of 7,654, with 2,485 households, including 1,772 families, and a median age of 35.1 years. About 30.5% of residents were under the age of 18 and 11.1% of residents were 65 years of age or older. For every 100 females there were 97.8 males, and for every 100 females age 18 and over there were 95.6 males age 18 and over.

57.1% of residents lived in urban areas, while 42.9% lived in rural areas.

There were 2,485 households in Mont Belvieu, of which 49.7% had children under the age of 18 living in them. Of all households, 69.6% were married-couple households, 10.2% were households with a male householder and no spouse or partner present, and 16.4% were households with a female householder and no spouse or partner present. About 13.4% of all households were made up of individuals and 6.4% had someone living alone who was 65 years of age or older.

There were 2,629 housing units, of which 5.5% were vacant. The homeowner vacancy rate was 1.0% and the rental vacancy rate was 12.3%.

Racial composition as of the 2020 census
Race	Number	Percent
White	6,049	79.0%
Black or African American	276	3.6%
American Indian and Alaska Native	50	0.7%
Asian	208	2.7%
Native Hawaiian and Other Pacific Islander	1	0.0%
Some other race	305	4.0%
Two or more races	765	10.0%
Hispanic or Latino (of any race)	1,097	14.3%

=== 2000 census ===
As of the 2000 census, there were 2,324 people, 805 households, and 664 families residing in the city. The population density was 160.0 inhabitants per square mile (61.8/km^{2}). There were 888 housing units at an average density of 61.1 units per square mile (23.6 units/km^{2}). The racial makeup of the city was 90.96% White, 4.26% African American, 0.69% Native American, 0.43% Asian, 2.50% from other races, and 1.16% from two or more races. Hispanic or Latino of any race were 6.50% of the population.

There were 805 households, out of which 49.1% had children under the age of 18 living with them, 69.2% were married couples living together, 8.6% had a female householder with no husband present, and 17.4% were non-families. 15.0% of all households were made up of individuals, and 4.0% had someone living alone who was 65 years of age or older. The average household size was 2.88 and the average family size was 3.19.

In the city, the population was spread out, with 31.5% under the age of 18, 7.3% from 18 to 24, 32.2% from 25 to 44, 23.5% from 45 to 64, and 5.6% who were 65 years of age or older. The median age was 33 years. For every 100 females, there were 98.5 males. For every 100 females age 18 and over, there were 97.0 males.

The median income for a household in the city was $54,732, and the median income for a family was $64,808. Males had a median income of $47,614 versus $29,537 for females. The per capita income for the city was $22,415. About 6.4% of families and 7.4% of the population were below the poverty line, including 6.7% of those under age 18 and 18.8% of those age 72 or over.

== Economy ==
In 2019 Dwight Silverman of the Houston Chronicle described Mont Belvieu as "a fairly affluent city" due to its taxes on the various area industrial plants. In addition it is at the junction of various oil and natural gas pipelines numbering in the hundreds.

== Government and infrastructure ==
By 2019, Mont Belvieu began offering a municipal broadband internet service, MB Link, as home rule cities in Texas are permitted to establish municipal internet. Mont Belvieu won a court agreement in 2017 that internet is a utility, like electricity and water. Mont Belvieu chose this path because it was unable to persuade private telecommunications companies to expand or add new infrastructure for internet purposes, even after the city government offered to have the cables laid.

The United States Postal Service operates the Mont Belvieu Post Office at 16043 Eagle Drive, 77580-9700.

== Education ==
The portion of Mont Belvieu in Chambers County is served by the Barbers Hill Independent School District. The portion in Liberty County is zoned to Dayton Independent School District.

The Sam and Carmena Goss Memorial Branch Library in Mont Belvieu is a branch of the Chambers County Library System. They are located at 1 John Hall Drive, Mont Belvieu, Texas 77523.

Residents of Barbers Hill ISD and Dayton ISD are zoned to Lee College.
