= Barbers Hill High School =

Location
- 9600 Eagle Drive; Mont Belvieu, Texas 77580-1108; United States; 29.8431°N 94.8521°W

Information
- School type: Public high school
- Motto: "We Can, We Will, We're Barbers Hill"
- Established: 1929
- School district: Barbers Hill Independent School District
- Principal: Lance Murphy
- Teaching staff: 152.97 (on an FTE basis)
- Grades: 9–12
- Enrollment: 2,222 (2024–2025)
- Student to teacher ratio: 14.53
- Colors: Blue & White
- Athletics conference: UIL Class AAAAAA
- Mascot: Eagle/Lady Eagle
- Website: hs.bhisd.net

Barbers Hill High School (BHHS) is a school based in Mont Belvieu, Texas, and is classified as a 6A school by the UIL. It is part of the Barbers Hill Independent School District located in western Chambers County.

== History ==
=== Foundation and 20th century ===
Since the 1870s, there has been a school on Barbers Hill, which gets its name from Amos Joshua Barber, Sr. (1814–1885) who in 1849 had acquired 100 acres (40 ha) of land, now part of Mont Belvieu, Texas, and built a house on "the hill" – a salt dome which became known as Barbers Hill. In 1877, Barber donated land for a school which was built by residents of the community including members of the Barber family. The school became part of the Barbers Hill Common School District which was formed in 1885 as a free public school system. Barbers Hill Independent School District (BHISD) was officially formed as an independent school district in 1929 with the consolidation of the Common School Districts No. 10 and No. 11, along with students from Winfree. In subsequent years, several other schools in Chambers County were consolidated into the district. A referendum for a $100,000 bond was approved by voters in 1930, and the high school was constructed at the cost of $84,000. Barbers Hill High School (BHHS) officially opened in March 1931. The graduating Class of 1931 included a single student, Myrtle Traverso.

In 1955, the school district discovered that the high school, at the time located on the same land donated by Barber in 1877, was on a fault which was causing a crack in the building. In the early 1960s, enrollment in the school district was at 500 students. While the district suffered loss of tax revenue due to oil and mineral depletion during the 1960s and 1970s, new industries had developed in the area ensuring a healthy budget for the district. The school district, which raises revenue from property tax, had a valuation of $42.8 million as of 1968–1969 and levied a tax rate of $1.56 per $100 allowing it to budget for $730,458 in expenses.

The crack in the high school building was repaired but resurfaced in 1962. The school district issued a $1.5-million bond to raise funds for the construction of the new high school. Construction began on a building on a new 75-acre site north of Interstate 10 and centrally located in the district. By 1967, the high school had 173 students, and 877 students had graduated between 1931 and 1968. The new high school facility which was completed in 1968 included 14 classrooms, a gymnasium, auditorium, and an athletic facility, and had a capacity of 450 students. With the opening of the new building, the old school buildings served as the facilities for the middle school. In August 1975, a new elementary school facility was opened, and the middle school was moved there to allow for future demolition of the old building. The entryway of the original high school building was preserved in storage until 2017 when it was reinstalled as an open archway in the flag circle in front of the current school building.

=== Recent history ===
In 2001, Susan Haynie was appointed as principal of the school to succeed Glynn Hughes who had served as principal for three years. At the time of Haynie's appointment, Barbers Hill had about 710 students, graduated 158 seniors that year, and the school was preparing to move to a new building that was expected to accommodate as many as 1,000 students. Construction on the new building began in January 1999. In May 2001, faculty and staff began moving into the new campus located 100 yards north of the old facility. The new campus cost $27 million and was funded following the May 1998 bond referendum that raised $45 million. The funds were also used to construct a transportation building and a new concession stand to the football stadium.

The school district proposed a bond in September 2002 to raise $31.65 million, most of which will go to improving facilities for the lower grades of the school district while $1.75 million goes to the high school for construction of tennis courts and a baseball field as well as metal barns and farm animal pens for the agriculture program. The school district was expected to grow significantly over the next decade with as many as 5,294 students expected by the 2010--2011 school year. In 2004, Barbers Hill High School had around 160 seniors graduating that year. In 2005, the school district proposed a new bond referendum to raise another $43.8 million for projects including a 25-classroom addition to the high school and expansion of the student laptop program in lieu of computer labs. With the conversion of the computer labs to regular classrooms and the addition to add more classrooms, the high school was expected to accommodate as many as 1,600 students. A second addition of another 25 classrooms was also planned to begin in 2009.

In 2006, the high school was reclassified as Class 4A school with a student body of 1,260 and 90 teachers and staff. Tom Holland served as principal of the school for five years during this period until his 2012 retirement, and the school achieved 100 percent senior graduation rate in his last two years as principal. Beginning in July 2012, Rick Kana, previously principal of the Barbers Hill Intermediate School, was named to replace Holland as the principal of the high school. By 2017, BHHS had 1,493 students, a 98 percent graduation rate, and 346 graduating seniors. A new bond election in 2017 approved further expansion of the school.

In January 2020, a student was suspended and informed that he would be forbidden from attending graduation due to the length of his dreadlocks. However, the student's family and political activists have asserted that the action taken against him was discriminatory. Other students of the high school also spoke out against the policy, describing it as gender discrimination, since girls are allowed to have long hair, while boys are not. A federal judge ruled that the district’s hair policy was discriminatory. On August 31, 2023, another student was suspended over his dreadlocks. His family filed a federal civil rights lawsuit against the state’s governor and attorney general, alleging they failed to enforce a new law outlawing discrimination based on hairstyles. Texas passed the CROWN Act on May 27, 2023, and the law took effect on September 1, 2023.

The latter case was dismissed in July 2025 with the judge ruling that the school policy on the length of boys’ hair is not prohibited by the CROWN Act as long as it does not discriminate against hair texture or styles associated with race.

According to a consultant’s March 2022 report to the school district, high school enrollment was expected to rise to 4,000 in the next decade but planned to keep to a single high school.

== Academics ==
Based on the results of the state standardized tests Texas Assessment of Academic Skills, the Texas Education Agency (TEA) gave Barbers Hill High School a top rank of "exemplary" in 2002.

In 2017, Barbers Hill was ranked in the top 10 percent of high schools in the U.S. News & World Report, which ranked the school No. 2,045 out of 22,000 schools in the U.S. and 179th among schools in Texas. That year BHHS had 42 percent of students participating in the Advanced Placement examinations, one of the criteria in the rankings.

The school received an overall rating of "A" by TEA’s School Report Card in 2022, 2023, 2024 and 2025.

== Athletics ==
State championships
| Sport | Championship year (class/division) |
|---|---|
| Baseball | 2021 (5A) |
| Basketball (girls) | 1982 (3A), 1983 (3A), 1997 (3A) |
| Football | 1971 (1A) †, 1976 (1A) † Co-champion with Sonora High School |
| Softball | 2021 (5A), 2026 (5A/D1) |
| Track | 1935 (All), 1956 (B) |

In 1971, Barbers Hill’s football team tied the defending champions Sonora High School in a 3-3 deadlock that resulted in the two teams sharing the conference title. The football team won an outright state championship in 1976, defeating defending champions DeLeon High School in a 17-8 victory.

The Barbers Hill High School girls basketball team won the Class 3A state championships in 1982 and 1983. The girls team won its third 3A state title in March 1997 with a 66-45 victory over Dripping Springs.

In 2014, Barbers Hill sophomore Camyn Knox won the World Association of Bencher and Deadlifters, setting a world record in the 16-17-year-olds and 165-pound weight class.

In June 2021, both the Barbers Hill softball and baseball teams became Class 5A state champions with Raithen Malone winning tournament MVP on the baseball team. In May 2026, the softball team also won the Class 5A Division I state title in a 11-0 win in which junior Macie Bryant pitched a perfect game and sophomore Maddi Ray scored a walk-off grand slam.

In track and field, Jayden Thrower won back-to-back Class 5A state championships in the triple jump in 2024 and 2025.

== Performing arts ==
Barbers Hill has won Texas's University Interscholastic League's (ULI) annual One-Act Play competition on multiple occasions. Between 1995 and 2003, Barbers Hill advanced to the state competition seven out of the eight years. Then in the 3A category, the school won in 1996 with a performance of Strider, in 1999 for a performance of The Caucasian Chalk Circle, and in 2003 for another performance of Strider. In the 4A category, the school won in 2010 (4A) The Night Thoreau Spent in Jail, and in 2011 for a performance of The Awakening of Spring.

Barbers Hill High School is also the home of the Soaring Eagle Marching Band. In 1991, the marching band was the 1991 champions of ULI's State Wind Ensemble Contest. In the 2010 and 2011 marching seasons, the band received straight 1's for a first division rating at the UIL Region Marching Band Competition. The Soaring Eagle Marching Band was one of only 2 bands (the other being the Galena Park High School marching band) to receive this rating at the contest. In 2011 the Soaring Eagle Marching Band went on to the regional marching contest. In 2013, the Soaring Eagle Marching Band and 3 other schools in Area 4A went on to play at state in San Antonio.

== Notable alumni ==
Notable alumni include Carl Brazell who graduated in 1935 and went on to become a running back in the National Football League. Buddy Tinsley graduated from the high school in 1943 and became a Canadian Football Hall of Famer.

Class of 2018 graduate Charli Collier was the first overall pick in the 2021 WNBA draft. Cam Cauley, who graduated in 2021, became an infielder in the Texas Rangers.
