= Raywood, Texas =

Human settlement in Texas, United States

Coordinates: 30°02′31″N 94°40′20″W

Raywood is an unincorporated community in Liberty County, Texas, United States.

== Education ==
Raywood is zoned to schools in the Hull-Daisetta and Liberty Independent School District.
