= Hull-Daisetta Independent School District =

School district in Texas, United States

Hull Daisetta ISD

Address
- 117 North Main Highway 770 Daisetta, Texas; United States
- Coordinates: 30.1169°N 94.6454°W

District information
- Type: Public
- Established: 1925; 101 years ago
- Superintendent: Tim Bartram
- NCES District ID: 4823880

Students and staff
- Enrollment: 416 (2023–2024)
- Teachers: 36.41 (on an FTE basis) (2023–2024)
- Staff: 50.66 (on an FTE basis) (2023–2024)
- Student–teacher ratio: 11.43 (2023–2024)
- District mascot: Bobcat
- Colors: Red, White, and Black

Other information
- Website: www.hdisd.net

Hull-Daisetta Independent School District (HDISD) is a public school district based in Daisetta, Texas, United States. The district also serves the communities of Hull and Raywood.

Hull-Daisetta High School is the only team from Liberty county to win a state championship in Class 1A Football by defeating China Spring by a score of Hull-Daisetta 28, China Springs 18 in the 1979 UIL state football championship game.

In 2009, the school district was rated "academically acceptable" by the Texas Education Agency.

== History ==
Before the Hull-Daisetta ISD was established Hull & Daisetta were typical rural settlements. The land was used for farming and raising livestock. Oakdale, a one-teacher school, served the community for many years.

Oil was discovered in Hull in 1918 and brought an increased population to the area.

The Oakdale School was soon too small and was forced to hire another teacher. The history of Oakdale School has been told many different ways, but people who were there say it was located in the back of the Barngrover's homestead. Shortly after the installation of a second teacher a second school was opened on the A. Merchant Lease located in Common School District 21.

In 1921, by a special act of legislature, the Hull ISD was organized and the board held their first meeting on July 29, 1921. At the meeting, the school board decided to purchase an old hotel building on FM 770 in Daisetta & moved Oakdale closer to the business section of town. The school facilities soon became too small & a bunk-shack was donated by Humble Oil Company to enlarge them. The three-teacher school continued in Hull and necessary equipment was purchased to furnish the new schools in addition to Oakdale. There were 10 grades taught and no extracurricular activities. The school district expanded to house a rapidly increasing school population.

In 1922 the board decided to take out a bond that totaled $100,000. The school site was then expanded to 10 acres (40,000 m^{2}) through purchases and a gift. A wooden building was built to house the 6th-10th grades. The first five grades were still held in the old hotel building. The hotel building was abandoned in 1923, and 1st-5th grades were relocated to a temporary building and an 11th grade was added to the school. By the 1924-1925 school years the school had 30 teachers and several new additions. Modern equipment had been installed for the new extracurricular classes: home economics, commercial subjects, and a library. The high-school boasted 4.5 units of accredited studies during this school year. Construction for the first Hull & Daisetta schools started during the summer of 1925. Construction was funded by $190,000 of the proceeds of the bond purchases issued in 1922 and 1925. The Daisetta school outlay was $136,000. The Hull elementary was $44,000. The buildings were completed December 1925 and classes began January 2, 1926.

A special act of a called session of the 39th Texas State Legislature in 1925 changed the name of the district to Hull-Daisetta Independent School District and enlarged the district's boundaries to their present locations. As the school grew in enrollment, the curriculum was expanded to 29.5 credit units and the teaching staff was increased to a high of 42.

The Woodson School of Hull-Daisetta ISD was organized in 1938 for the African-American community. The two-teacher school was an elementary school conducted in crude, unsealed buildings. Teaching equipment was in extremely short supply and black oil cloth was used for blackboards. The school terms were short varying from 3–7 months with a normal term of four. The old school was heated by wood stoves and did not have electricity. High school work was first offered to the black in 1942.

As enrollment increased at Woodson, the curriculum grew. Vocational agriculture, athletics, home economics and a band were successfully added to the curriculum.

The present educational plant was built in 3 stages. The agriculture building was built in 1949. The present high-school building was built in 1952, followed by the elementary and gym in 1956.

In 1963, the citizens of Hull-Daisetta voted to purchase a $1,000,000 bond for the purpose of replacing the high school, the elementary, and to build a new band hall at Woodson. The project was completed in 1965.

In March 1966 the Woodson School was integrated with the other schools in the district creating a totally integrated district. This was one of the most successful integrations in the state and is still a model today.

The present district encompasses 70 square miles (180 km^{2}). The socio-economic of the population is low-middle class and upper-lower class. The school offers a comprehensive education and is fully accredited.

The district changed to a four-day school week in fall 2022. The district conducted surveys and found respondents in favor of doing this.

== Schools ==
- Hull-Daisetta High School (grades 9–12)
- Hull-Daisetta Junior High School (grades 7–8)
- Hull-Daisetta Elementary School (grades PK-6)
