= Lee College =

Public community college in Baytown, Texas

- Type: Community college
- Established: 1934
- Affiliations: Region XIV Athletic Conference
- President: Lynda Villanueva
- Students: 7,790 (Fall 2021)
- Location: Baytown, Texas, United States; 29°44′04″N 94°58′35″W
- Campus: Urban
- Colors: Scarlet and Gray
- Nickname: Navigators
- Mascot: Navigator
- Website: www.lee.edu

Lee College is a public community college in Baytown, Texas. Lee College's main campus occupies 40 acres (160,000 m^{2}) near downtown Baytown and extension campuses throughout its service area. The school has an enrollment of over 7,773 total students as of Fall 2018. Approximately 83% are part-time students, and about 17% are enrolled full-time. The college offers over 60 academic, technical education, and non-credit continuing education programs.

== History ==
In 1934, the Goose Creek Consolidated Independent School District voted unanimously to ask the Texas State Board of Education to approve the establishment of a junior college district. The petition was approved, and the college's first students matriculated in September 1934. Lee College is named after Confederate general Robert E. Lee.

At the time of its inception, the college was named Lee Junior College. Classes were held at Robert E. Lee High School in the evenings and during the summer months, after the high school classes were dismissed. Many of the original faculty also taught at Robert E. Lee High School. The inaugural class of Lee College consisted of 177 students, and the first graduation, on May 24, 1935, saw 4 students (all women) receive diplomas.

In 1948, the Southern Association of Colleges and Schools granted Lee College accreditation and recommended that the college develop its own campus apart from the local high school. A successful bond election in the following year allowed for the construction of Rundell Hall and the campus gymnasium. The college experienced tremendous growth after classes began in the new buildings in 1951.

By 1965, the college had added the Social Sciences building, the Library, Moler Hall, TV1 and Bonner Hall as well as an addition to the gymnasium. Funding from the 1988 bond issue allowed for the construction of a new science building to replace the antiquated facilities formerly housed in the Math and Administration building. The renovation of the McNulty-Haddick building created additional classroom space for Allied Health and Fine Arts.

In 2000, another successful bond election led to expansion of the campus by more than 33 percent with the addition in 2002 of a new Advanced Technology Center (library). Parking was also expanded and beautification efforts including a central courtyard, covered walks, and landscaping were completed.

In 2003, the Technical-Vocational Building received major renovation, including the construction of a Cisco Academy.

In October 2004, the college completed renovation to the old library into a Student Center with game room, Cyber Café, Bayer Conference Center, Enterprise Gallery, Security office, and student club offices. In December 2004, the college finished renovation to the old gym, which now provides offices, swimming pool, weight room and other facilities.

In 2008, Lee College began construction of its showcase Performing Arts Center, which opened in 2009 and today hosts a variety of campus and community events.

In 2012, a paper by former honor student Celeste Butler earned the school a historical marker dedication.

In 2015, Rundell Hall saw its grand reopening following a $10 million restoration and expansion. Rundell Hall now serves as the administrative center of the Lee College Baytown campus and has a conference center as well as offices and various departments.

In 2013–2014, the Lee College Debate Team won the 2013-2014 International Public Debate Association (IPDA) Community College Championship as well as the 2014 IPDA National Championship Tournament Community College Championship. Lee College Debate, renamed the Mendoza Debate Society at Lee College, repeated as both 2014-2015 IPDA Community College Champions as well as 2015 IPDA National Championship Tournament Community College Champions. The Mendoza Debate Society at Lee College won the 2015-2016 IPDA Community College Championship and the 2016 IPDA National Championship Tournament Community College Championship as they hosted the 2016 IPDA National Championship Tournament & Convention. In 2020, for the fifth time in seven years, the team was named (IDPA) National Community College Champions, and ranked 9th in the nation overall.

In 2022, the Lee College Board of Regents voted to rebrand the school's mascot from the "Runnin' Rebels" and character "Rooty Rebel" to the "Lee College Navigators."

== Service area ==
As defined by the Texas Legislature, the official service area of Lee College includes territory within the following school districts:

- Goose Creek Independent School District
- Crosby Independent School District
- Dayton Independent School District
- Liberty Independent School District
- Barbers Hill Independent School District
- Anahuac Independent School District
- Huffman Independent School District
- Devers Independent School District
- East Chambers Independent School District
- Hardin Independent School District
- Hull-Daisetta Independent School District

== Athletics ==
Lee College is home to the Navigators Men's Basketball and Women's Volleyball. The school competes in the Region XIV Athletic Conference of the NJCAA.

In 2003, the college opened a new "Wellness Center and Sports Complex". The complex contains Lee College Arena, the home arena for basketball and volleyball.

== Notable alumni ==
- Charles Holcomb (born 1933), judge of the Texas Court of Criminal Appeals from 2001 to 2010, attended Lee College as an undergraduate.
- Jeff Banister (born 1964), manager of the MLB Texas Rangers (baseball) from 2015 to 2018, attended Lee College as an undergraduate and played on the Lee College baseball team.
- Bob Lanier (1925-2014), former mayor of Houston, Texas.
