= Texas =

U.S. state

- State
- Flag Seal
- Nickname: The Lone Star State
- Motto: Friendship
- Anthem: "Texas, Our Texas"
- Location of Texas within the United States
- Country: United States
- Before statehood: Republic of Texas
- Admitted to the Union: December 29, 1845 (28th)
- Capital: Austin
- Largest city: Houston
- Largest county or equivalent: Harris
- Largest metro and urban areas: Dallas–Fort Worth (MSA); Houston (UA)

Government
  - Governor: Greg Abbott (R)
  - Lieutenant Governor: Dan Patrick (R)
- Legislature: Texas Legislature
  - Upper house: Senate
  - Lower house: House of Representatives
- Judiciary: Supreme Court of Texas (Civil); Texas Court of Criminal Appeals (Criminal)
- U.S. senators: John Cornyn (R); Ted Cruz (R)
- U.S. House delegation: 24 Republicans; 13 Democrats; 1 vacant (list)

Area
  - Total: 268,597 sq mi (695,662 km^{2})
  - Land: 261,232 sq mi (676,587 km^{2})
  - Water: 7,365 sq mi (19,075 km^{2}) 2.7%
  - Rank: 2nd

Dimensions
  - Length: 801 mi (1,289 km)
  - Width: 773 mi (1,244 km)
- Elevation: 1,710 ft (520 m)
- Highest elevation (Guadalupe Peak (Note: Elevation adjusted to North American Vertical Datum of 1988)): 8,751 ft (2,667.4 m)
- Lowest elevation (Gulf of Mexico): 0 ft (0 m)

Population (est. 2025)
  - Total: ▲31,709,821
  - Rank: 2nd
  - Density: 111/sq mi (42.9/km^{2})
  - Rank: 23rd
  - Median household income: ▲$75,800 (2023)
  - Income rank: 23rd
- Demonym(s): Texan; Texian (archaic); Tejano (usually only used for Hispanics)

Language
  - Official language: None
  - Spoken language: English only: 64.9%; Spanish: 28.8%; Other: 6.3%

Time zones
- Most of the state: UTC−06:00 (CST)
  - Summer (DST): UTC−05:00 (CDT)
- El Paso, Hudspeth, and northwestern Culberson counties: UTC−07:00 (MST)
  - Summer (DST): UTC−06:00 (MDT)
- USPS abbreviation: TX
- ISO 3166 code: US-TX
- Traditional abbreviation: Tex.
- Latitude: 25°50′ N to 36°30′ N
- Longitude: 93°31′ W to 106°39′ W
- Website: texas.gov

Texas (/ˈtɛksəs/ TEK-səss) (Note: locally also /ˈtɛksɪz/ TEK-siz; Spanish: Texas or Tejas (Note: In Peninsular Spanish, the spelling variant Tejas is also used alongside Texas. According to the Diccionario panhispánico de dudas by the Royal Spanish Academy and the Association of Academies of the Spanish Language, the spelling version with ⟨j⟩ aligns with modern-day orthographic conventions and is correct; however, the spelling with ⟨x⟩ is recommended, as it is the one that is used in Mexican Spanish. See Spanish orthography § History.) pronounced [ˈtexas]) is a state in the United States. Located in the south-central part of the country, it borders Louisiana, Arkansas, Oklahoma, and New Mexico. It also borders Mexico along the Rio Grande, and has a coastline on the Gulf of Mexico. Covering 268,596 square miles (695,660 km^{2}) and with an estimated population of over 31.7 million residents in 2025, it is the second-largest state by both area and population. Texas is nicknamed the "Lone Star State" for the single star depicted on the Republic of Texas flag in 1836 during the Texas war for independence from Mexico, symbolizing Texans' enduring independent spirit and distinct national identity. The lone star design was originally flown in 1819 during the Long Expedition, an early attempt to liberate Texas from Spanish imperial rule.

Spain was the first European country to claim and control Texas, followed by brief French colonization. The territory became part of Mexico after its independence from Spain in 1821. Increasing tensions between settlers and the Mexican government culminated in the Texas Revolution, which included the Battle of the Alamo, and led to the establishment of the independent Republic of Texas in 1836. In 1845, Texas joined the United States as the 28th state, which helped spark the Mexican–American War. Texas remained a slave state until the American Civil War, during which it seceded from the Union and joined the Confederate States. After the war and the restoration of its representation in the federal government, Texas entered a prolonged period of economic stagnation before undergoing substantial economic growth in the 20th century.

The economy of Texas is highly diversified with major industries including energy, agriculture, technology, manufacturing, and aerospace. It has the second-highest gross state product among U.S. states and has led the country in state export revenue since 2002. Its largest metropolitan areas include the Dallas–Fort Worth metroplex and Greater Houston, while Austin is the state capital. Texas contains diverse landscapes spanning the Gulf Coast, Piney Woods, plains, hills, deserts, and mountains, reflecting its large size and varied topography.

== Etymology ==
The name Texas, based on the Caddo word táy:shaʼ (/tə́jːʃaʔ/) 'friend', was applied, in the spelling Tejas or Texas, by the Spanish to the Caddo themselves, specifically the Hasinai Confederacy.

During Spanish colonial rule, in the 18th century, the area was known as Nuevas Filipinas ('New Philippines') and Nuevo Reino de Filipinas ('New Kingdom of the Philippines'), or as provincia de los Tejas ('province of the Tejas'), later also provincia de Texas (or de Tejas), ('province of Texas'). It was incorporated as provincia de Texas into the Mexican Empire in 1821, and declared a republic in 1836. The Royal Spanish Academy recognizes both spellings, Tejas and Texas, as Spanish-language forms of the name.

The English pronunciation with /ks/ is unetymological, contrary to the historical value of the letter x (/ʃ/) in Spanish orthography. Alternative etymologies of the name advanced in the late 19th century connected the name Texas with the Spanish word teja, meaning 'roof tile', the plural tejas being used to designate Indigenous Pueblo settlements. A 1760s map by Jacques-Nicolas Bellin shows a village named Teijas on the Trinity River, close to the site of modern Crockett.

== History ==
=== Precontact era ===
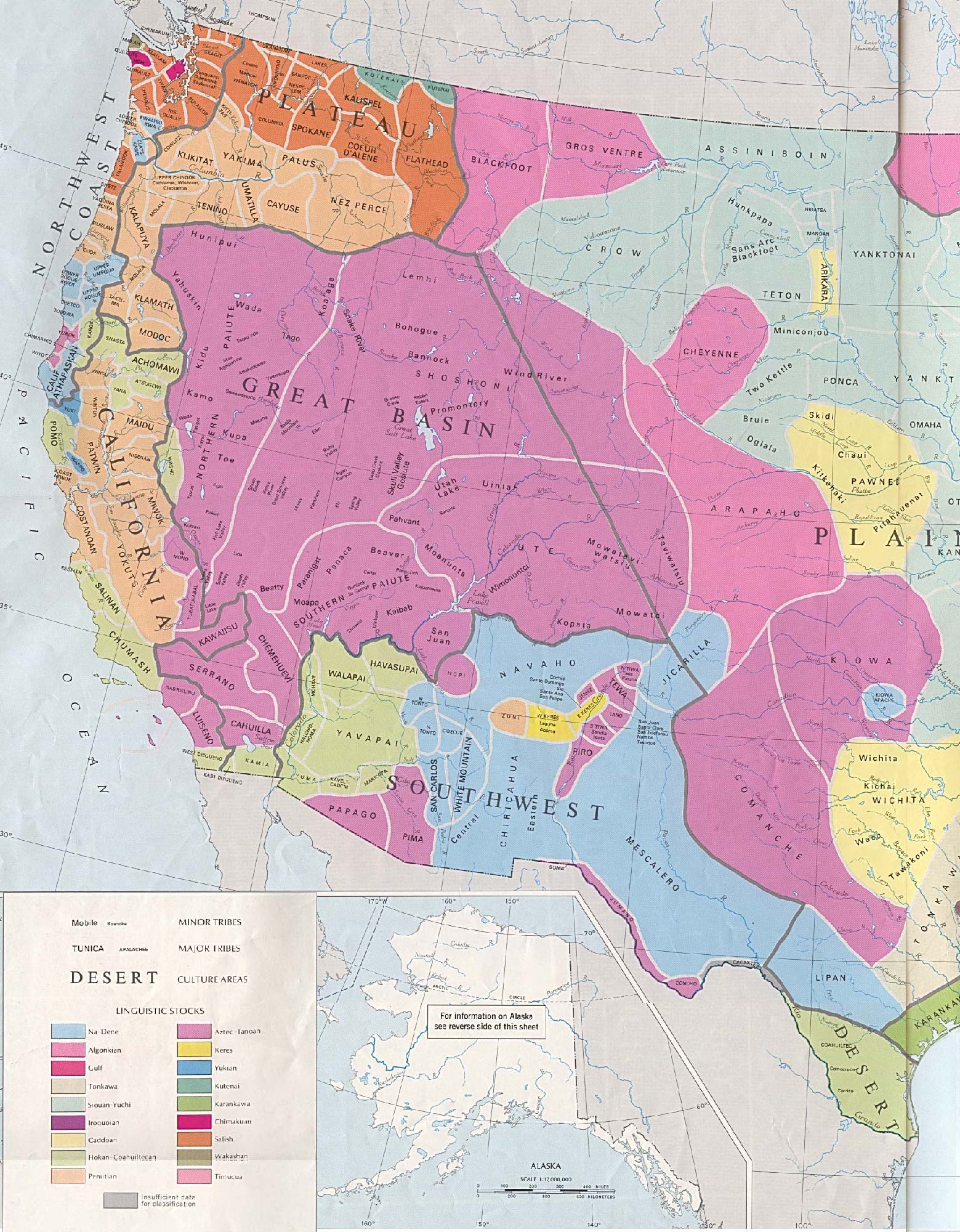
Early Native American tribal territories

Texas lies between two major cultural spheres of Pre-Columbian North America: the Southwestern and the Plains areas. Archaeologists have found that three major Indigenous cultures lived in this territory, and reached their developmental peak before the first European contact. These were: the Ancestral Puebloans from the upper Rio Grande region, centered west of Texas; the Mississippian culture, also known as Mound Builders, which extended along the Mississippi River Valley east of Texas; and the civilizations of Mesoamerica, which were centered south of Texas. Influence of Teotihuacan in northern Mexico peaked around AD 500 and declined between the 8th and 10th centuries.

When Europeans first arrived in the Texas region, the languages present in the state were Caddoan, Atakapan, Athabaskan, Coahuiltecan, and Uto-Aztecan, in addition to several language isolates such as Tonkawa. Uto-Aztecan Puebloan and Jumano peoples lived near the Rio Grande in the western portion of the state, and the Athabaskan-speaking Apache tribes lived throughout the interior. The agricultural, mound-building Caddo controlled much of the northeastern part of the state, along the Red, Sabine, and Neches River basins. Atakapan peoples such as the Akokisa and Bidai lived along the northeastern Gulf Coast; the Karankawa lived along the central coast. At least one tribe of Coahuiltecans, the Aranama, lived in southern Texas. This entire culture group, primarily centered in northeastern Mexico, is now extinct.

No one culture was dominant across the territory of present-day Texas, with many peoples inhabiting the area. Native American tribes who have lived inside the boundaries of present-day Texas include the Alabama, Apache, Atakapan, Bidai, Caddo, Aranama, Comanche, Choctaw, Coushatta, Hasinai, Jumano, Karankawa, Kickapoo, Kiowa, Tonkawa, and Wichita. Many of these peoples migrated from the north or east during the colonial period, such as the Choctaw, Alabama-Coushatta, and Delaware.

The region was primarily controlled by the Spanish until the Texas Revolution. They were most interested in relationships with the Caddo, who were - like the Spanish - a settled, agricultural people. Several Spanish missions were opened in Caddo territory, but a lack of interest in Christianity among the Caddo meant that few were converted. Positioned between French Louisiana and Spanish Texas, the Caddo maintained relations with both, but were closer with the French. After Spain took control of Louisiana, most of the missions in eastern Texas were closed and abandoned. The United States obtained Louisiana following the 1803 Louisiana Purchase and began convincing tribes to self-segregate from whites by moving west; facing an overflow of native peoples in Missouri and Arkansas, they were able to negotiate with the Caddo to allow several displaced peoples to settle on unused lands in eastern Texas. These included the Muscogee, Houma Choctaw, Lenape and Mingo Seneca, among others, who came to view the Caddoans as saviors.

The different temperaments of Native American tribes directly affected the fates of the European explorers and settlers coming to the area. Friendly tribes taught newcomers how to grow local crops, prepare foods, and hunt wild game, while warlike tribes resisted the settlers. Prior treaties with the Spanish forbade either side from militarizing its native population in any potential conflict between the two nations. Several outbreaks of violence between Native Americans and Texans started to spread in the prelude to the Texas Revolution. Texans accused tribes of stealing livestock. While no proof was found, those in charge of Texas at the time attempted to publicly blame and punish the Caddo, with speculation that the U.S. government was trying to keep them in check this way. The Caddo never turned to violence because of the situation, except in cases of self-defense.

By the 1830s, the U.S. had drafted the Indian Removal Act, which was used to facilitate the Trail of Tears. Fearing retribution, Indian Agents all over the eastern U.S. tried to convince all Indigenous peoples to uproot and move west. This included the Caddo of Louisiana and Arkansas. The first president of Texas, Sam Houston, aimed to cooperate and make peace with Native tribes, but his successor, Mirabeau B. Lamar, took a more hostile stance. Aggressive expansionism and systemic hostility by Anglo-Texan settlers, sanctioned by state policy, compelled the forced relocation of most indigenous populations to federal lands north of the Red River, culminating in the establishment of Indian Territory (present-day Oklahoma). Only the Alabama-Coushatta would remain in the parts of Texas subject to white settlement, though the Comanche would continue to control most of the western half of the state until their defeat in the 1870s and 1880s.

=== Colonization ===
The first historical document related to Texas was a map of the Gulf Coast, created in 1519 by Spanish explorer Alonso Álvarez de Pineda. Nine years later, shipwrecked Spanish explorer Álvar Núñez Cabeza de Vaca and his cohort became the first Europeans in what is now Texas. Cabeza de Vaca reported that in 1528, when the Spanish landed in the area, "half the natives died from a disease of the bowels and blamed us." Cabeza de Vaca also made observations about the way of life of the Ignaces Natives of Texas. (Note: Cabeza de Vaca wrote, "They went about with a firebrand, setting fire to the plains and timber so as to drive off the mosquitos, and also to get lizards and similar things which they eat, to come out of the soil. In the same manner they kill deer, encircling them with fires, and they do it also to deprive the animals of pasture, compelling them to go for food where the Indians want.") Francisco Vázquez de Coronado described another encounter with native people in 1541. (Note: Vázquez de Coronado wrote, "Two kinds of people travel around these plains with the cows; one is called Querechos and the others Teyas; they are very well built, and painted, and are enemies of each other. They have no other settlement or location than comes from traveling around with the cows. They kill all of these they wish and tan the hides, with which they clothe themselves and make their tents, and they eat the flesh, sometimes even raw, and they also even drink the blood when thirsty. The tents they make are like field tents, and they set them up over poles they have made for this purpose, which come together and are tied at the top, and when they go from one place to another they carry them on some dogs they have, of which they have many, and they load them with the tents and poles and other things, for the country is so level, as I said, that they can make use of these, because they carry the poles dragging along on the ground. The sun is what they worship most.")

The expedition of Hernando de Soto entered into Texas from the east, seeking a route to Mexico. They passed through the Caddo lands but turned back after reaching the River of Daycao (possibly the Brazos or Colorado), beyond which point the Native peoples were nomadic and did not have the agricultural stores to feed the expedition.

European powers ignored the area until accidentally settling there in 1685. Miscalculations by René-Robert Cavelier de La Salle resulted in his establishing the colony of Fort Saint Louis at Matagorda Bay rather than along the Mississippi River. The colony lasted only four years before succumbing to harsh conditions and hostile natives. A small band of survivors traveled eastward into the lands of the Caddo, but La Salle was killed by disgruntled expedition members.

In 1690 Spanish authorities, concerned that France posed a competitive threat, constructed several missions in East Texas among the Caddo. After Caddo resistance, the Spanish missionaries returned to Mexico. When France began settling Louisiana, in 1716 Spanish authorities responded by founding a new series of missions in East Texas. Two years later, they created San Antonio as the first Spanish civilian settlement in the area.

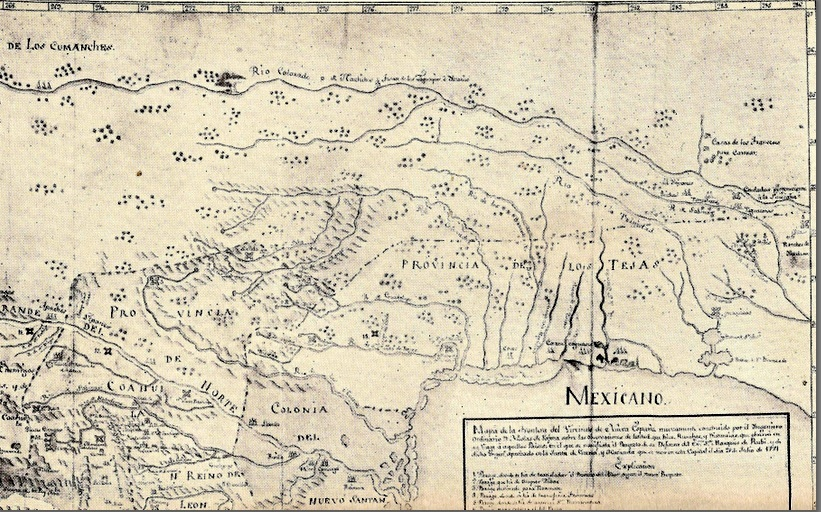
Nicolas de La Fora's 1771 map of the northern frontier of New Spain clearly shows the Provincia de los Tejas.

Hostile native tribes and distance from nearby Spanish colonies discouraged settlers from moving to the area. It was one of New Spain's least populated provinces. In 1749, the Spanish peace treaty with the Lipan Apache angered many tribes, including the Comanche, Tonkawa, and Hasinai. The Comanche signed a treaty with Spain in 1785 and later helped to defeat the Lipan Apache and Karankawa tribes. With numerous missions being established, priests led a peaceful conversion of most tribes. By the end of the 18th century only a few nomadic tribes had not converted.

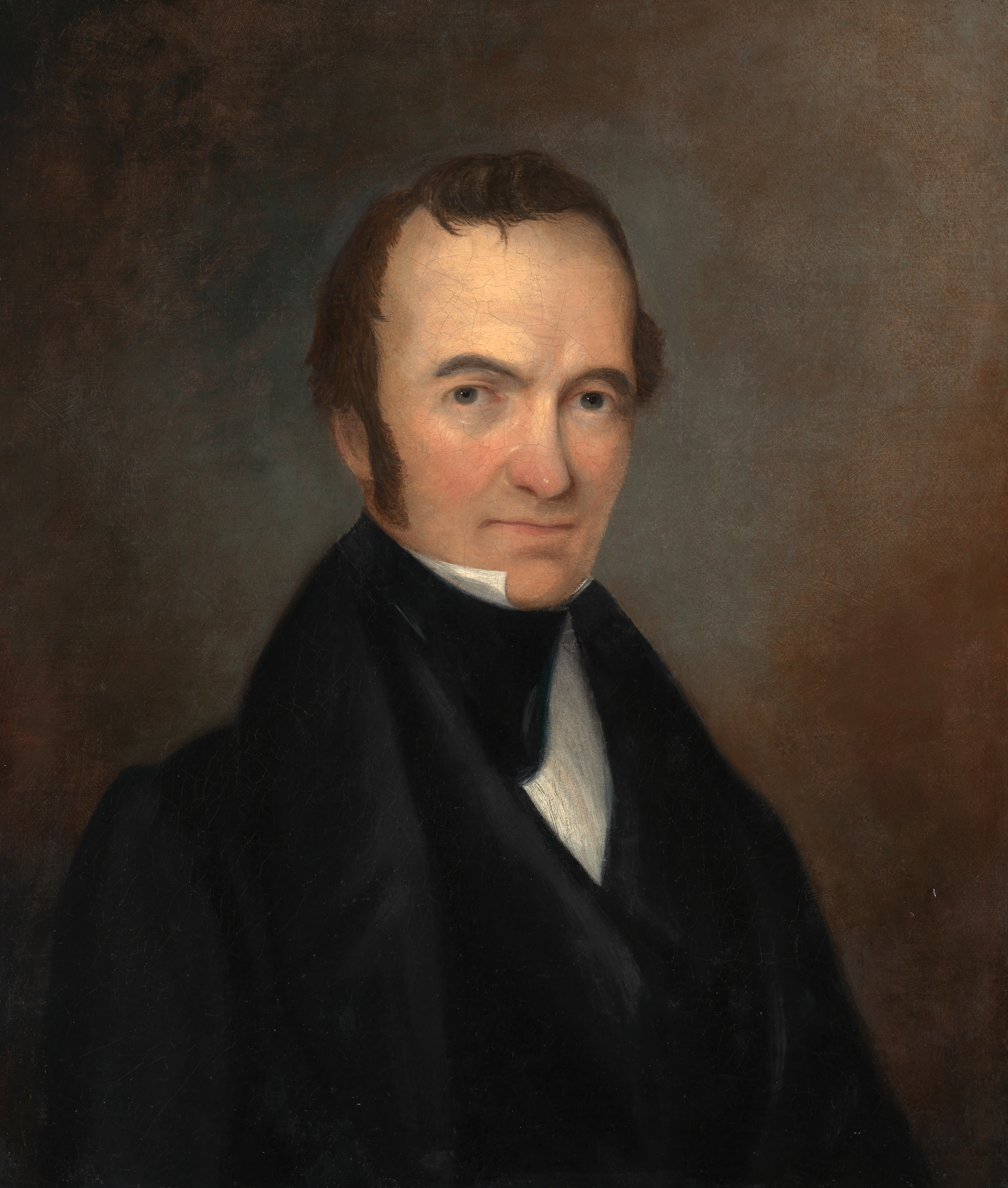
Stephen F. Austin was the first American empresario given permission to operate a colony within Mexican Texas.

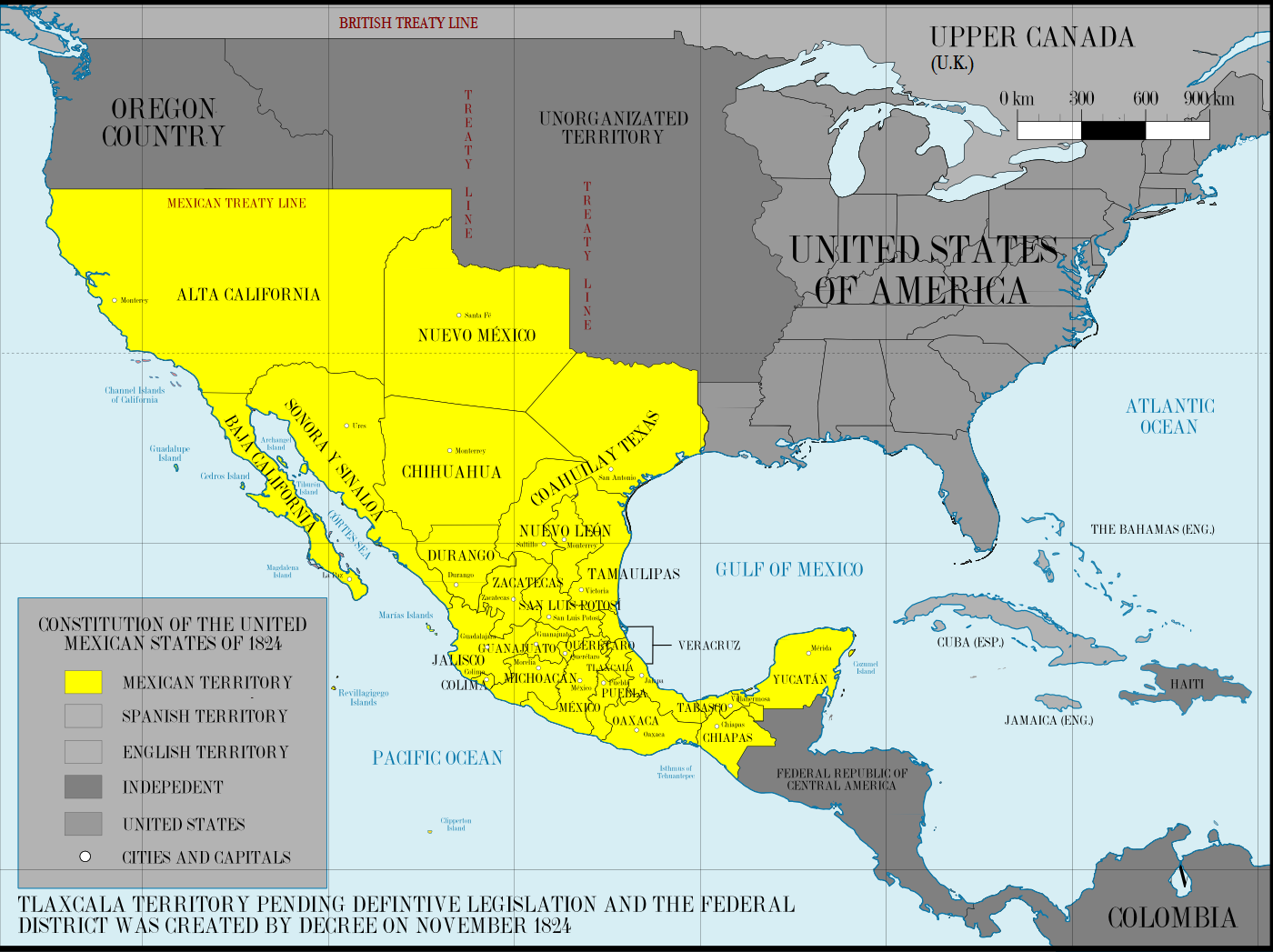
Mexico in 1824. Coahuila y Tejas is the northeasternmost state.

When the United States purchased Louisiana from France in 1803, American authorities insisted the agreement also included Texas. The boundary between New Spain and the United States was finally set in 1819 at the Sabine River, the modern border between Texas and Louisiana. Eager for new land, many U.S. settlers refused to recognize the agreement. Several filibusters raised armies to invade the area west of the Sabine River. Marked by the War of 1812, some men who had escaped from the Spanish, held (Old) Philippines had immigrated to and also passed through Texas (New Philippines) and reached Louisiana where Philippine exiles aided the United States in the defense of New Orleans against a British invasion, with Filipinos in the Saint Malo settlement assisting Jean Lafitte in the Battle of New Orleans.

In 1821, the Mexican War of Independence included the Texas territory, which became part of Mexico. Due to its low population, the territory was assigned to other states and territories of Mexico; the core territory was part of the state of Coahuila y Tejas, but other parts of today's Texas were part of Tamaulipas, Chihuahua, or the Mexican Territory of Santa Fe de Nuevo México.

Hoping more settlers would reduce the near-constant Comanche raids, Mexican Texas liberalized its immigration policies to permit immigrants from outside Mexico and Spain. As a result of this, large swathes of land were allotted to empresarios, who recruited settlers from the United States, Europe, and the Mexican interior, primarily the U.S. Austin's settlers, the Old Three Hundred, made places along the Brazos River in 1822. The population of Texas grew rapidly. By 1834, the population had grown to about 37,800 people, with only 7,800 of Mexican descent.

Mexican authorities prohibited continued immigration from the United States beginning in 1830. However, illegal immigration from the United States into Mexico continued to increase the population of Texas. New laws also called for the enforcement of customs duties, angering native Mexican citizens (Tejanos) and recent immigrants alike. The Anahuac Disturbances in 1832 were the first open revolt against Mexican rule, coinciding with a revolt in Mexico against the nation's president. Texians sided with the federalists against the government and drove all Mexican soldiers out of East Texas. They took advantage of the lack of oversight to agitate for more political freedom. Texians met at the Convention of 1832 to discuss requesting independent statehood, among other issues. The following year, Texians reiterated their demands at the Convention of 1833.

=== Republic ===
Within Mexico, tensions continued between federalists and centralists. In early 1835, wary Texians formed Committees of Correspondence and Safety. The unrest erupted into armed conflict in late 1835 at the Battle of Gonzales. This launched the Texas Revolution. Texians elected delegates to the Consultation, which created a provisional government. The provisional government soon collapsed from infighting, and Texas was without clear governance for the first two months of 1836.

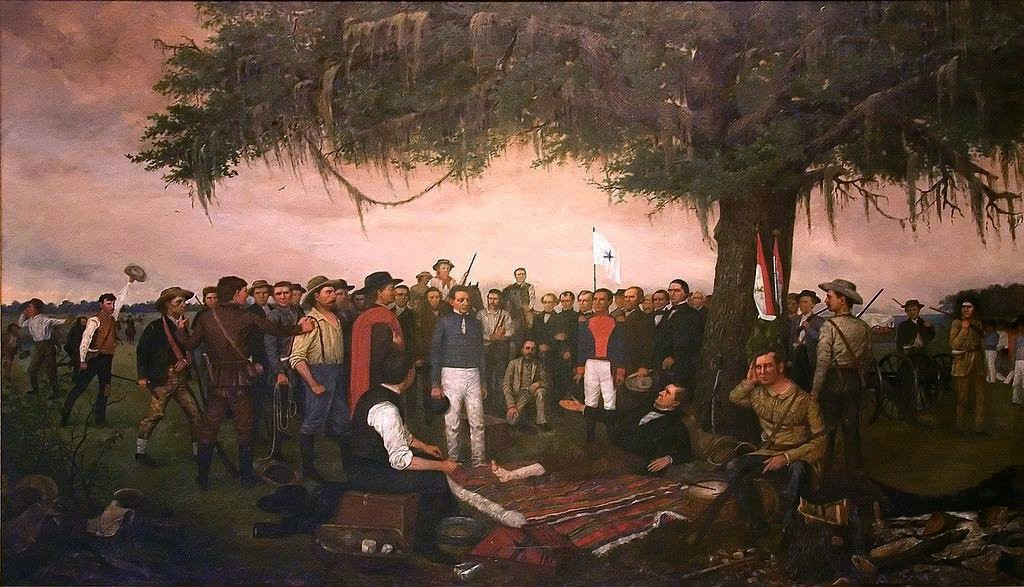
Surrender of Santa Anna. Painting by William Henry Huddle, 1886.

Mexican President Antonio López de Santa Anna personally led an army to end the revolt. General José de Urrea defeated all the Texian resistance along the coast culminating in the Goliad massacre. López de Santa Anna's forces, after a thirteen-day siege, overwhelmed Texian defenders at the Battle of the Alamo. News of the defeats sparked panic among Texas settlers.

The Republic of Texas with present-day borders superimposed

The newly elected Texian delegates to the Convention of 1836 quickly signed a declaration of independence on March 2, forming the Republic of Texas. After electing interim officers, the Convention disbanded. The new government joined the other settlers in Texas in the Runaway Scrape, fleeing from the approaching Mexican army.

After several weeks of retreat, the Texian Army commanded by Sam Houston attacked and defeated López de Santa Anna's forces at the Battle of San Jacinto. López de Santa Anna was captured and forced to sign the Treaties of Velasco, ending the war. The Constitution of the Republic of Texas prohibited the government from restricting slavery or freeing slaves, and required free people of African descent to leave the country.

Political battles raged between two factions of the new Republic. The nationalist faction, led by Mirabeau B. Lamar, advocated the continued independence of Texas, the expulsion of the Native Americans, and the expansion of the Republic to the Pacific Ocean. Their opponents, led by Sam Houston, advocated the annexation of Texas to the United States and peaceful co-existence with Native Americans. The conflict between the factions was typified by an incident known as the Texas Archive War. With wide popular support, Texas first applied for annexation to the United States in 1836, but its status as a slaveholding country caused its admission to be controversial and it was initially rebuffed. This status, and Mexican diplomacy in support of its claims to the territory, also complicated Texas's ability to form foreign alliances and trade relationships.

The Comanche Indians furnished the main Native American opposition to the Texas Republic, manifested in multiple raids on settlements. Mexico launched two small expeditions into Texas in 1842. The town of San Antonio was captured twice and Texans were defeated in battle in the Dawson massacre. Despite these successes, Mexico did not keep an occupying force in Texas, and the republic survived. The cotton price crash of the 1840s depressed the country's economy.

=== Statehood ===
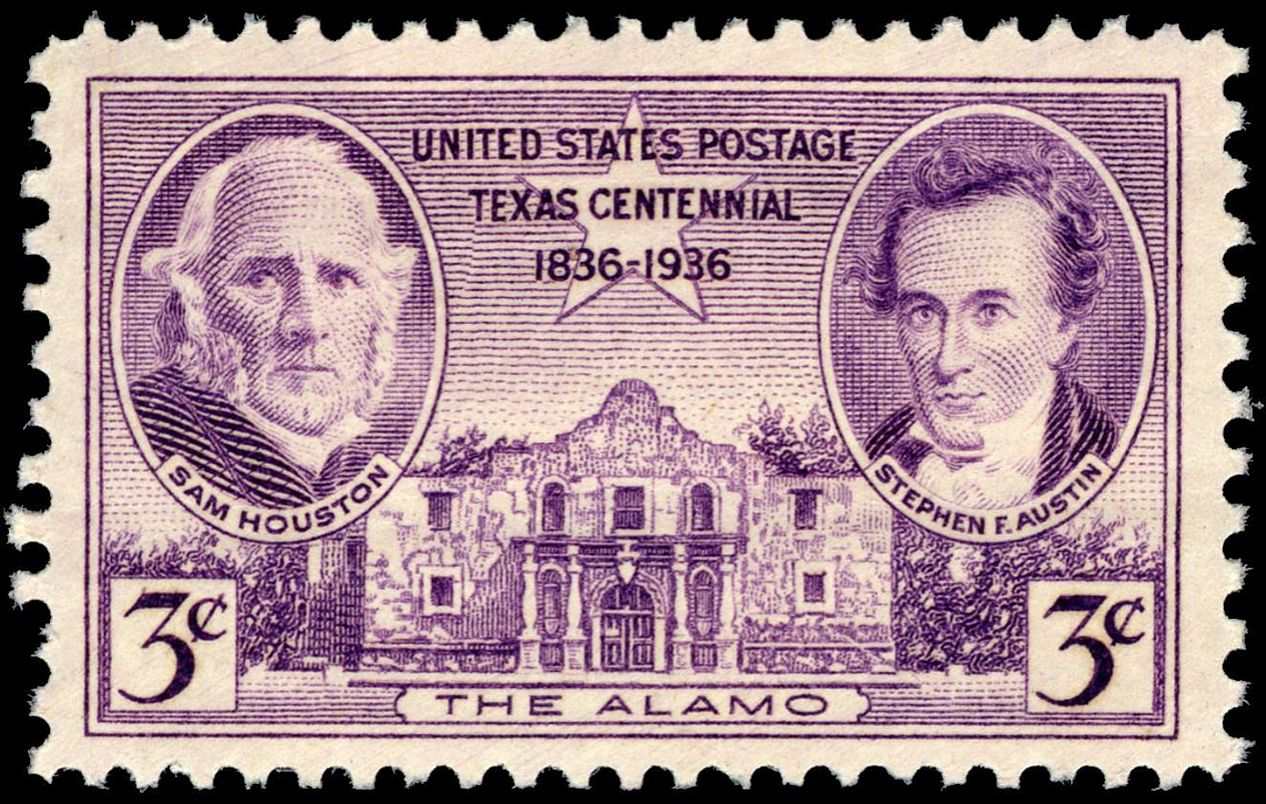
On March 2, 1936, the U.S. Post Office issued a commemorative stamp commemorating the 100th anniversary of the Texas Declaration of Independence, featuring Sam Houston (left), Stephen Austin and the Alamo.

Texas was finally officially annexed when the expansionist James K. Polk won the election of 1844. On December 29, 1845, the U.S. Congress admitted Texas to the U.S. After Texas's annexation, Mexico broke off diplomatic relations with the United States. While the United States claimed Texas's border stretched to the Rio Grande, Mexico claimed it was the Nueces River leaving the Rio Grande Valley under contested Texan sovereignty. While the former Republic of Texas could not enforce its border claims, the United States had the military strength and the political will to do so. President Polk ordered General Zachary Taylor south to the Rio Grande on January 13, 1846. A few months later Mexican troops routed an American cavalry patrol in the disputed area in the Thornton Affair starting the Mexican–American War. The first battles of the war were fought in Texas: the Siege of Fort Texas, Battle of Palo Alto and Battle of Resaca de la Palma. After these decisive victories, the United States invaded Mexican territory, ending the fighting in Texas.

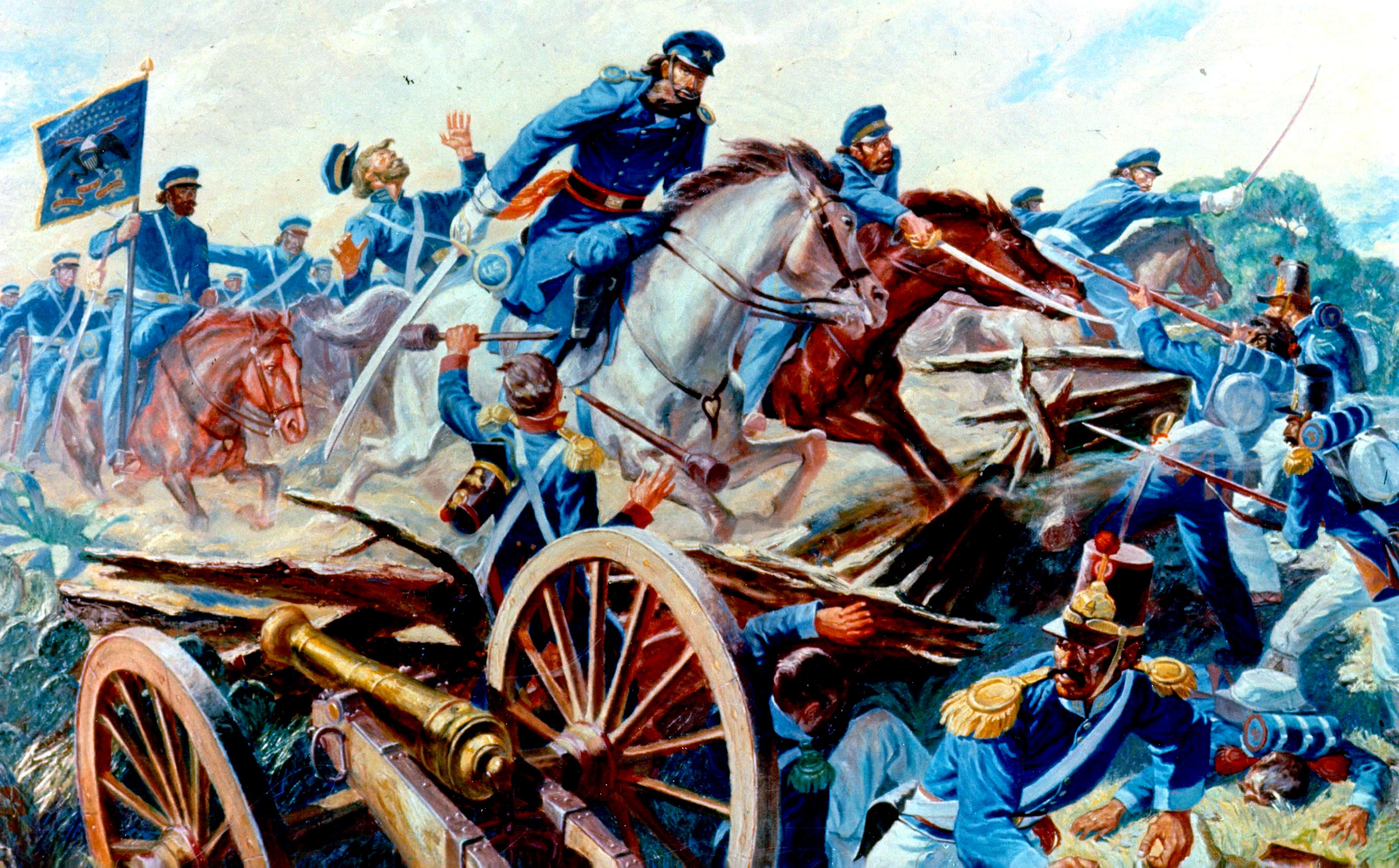
Captain Charles A. May's squadron of the 2nd Dragoons slashes through the Mexican Army lines. Resaca de la Palma, Texas, May 1846.

The Treaty of Guadalupe Hidalgo ended the two-year war. In return for US$18,250,000, (equivalent to $679,111,000 in 2025), Mexico gave the U.S. undisputed control of Texas, ceded the Mexican Cession in 1848, most of which today is called the American Southwest, and Texas's borders were established at the Rio Grande.

The Compromise of 1850 set Texas's boundaries at their present position: Texas ceded its claims to land which later became half of present-day New Mexico, a third of Colorado, and small portions of Kansas, Oklahoma, and Wyoming to the federal government, in return for the assumption of $10 million of the old republic's debt (equivalent to $372,115,000 in 2025). Post-war Texas grew rapidly as migrants poured into the cotton lands of the state. They also brought or purchased enslaved African Americans, whose numbers tripled in the state from 1850 to 1860, from 58,000 to 182,566.

=== Civil War to late 19th century ===
Texas re-entered war following the election of 1860. During this time, Black people comprised 30 percent of the state's population, and they were overwhelmingly enslaved. When Abraham Lincoln was elected, South Carolina seceded from the Union; five other Deep South states quickly followed. A state convention considering secession opened in Austin on January 28, 1861. On February 1, by a vote of 166–8, the convention adopted an Ordinance of Secession. Texas voters approved this Ordinance on February 23, 1861. Texas joined the newly created Confederate States of America on March 4, 1861, ratifying the permanent C.S. Constitution on March 23.

State symbols of Texas
List of state symbols
- Flag of Texas

- Seal of Texas

- Coat of arms of Texas
- Slogan: The Friendly State

Living insignia
- Bird: Northern mockingbird (Mimus polyglottos)
- Fish: Guadalupe bass (Micropterus treculii)
- Flower: Bluebonnet (Lupinus spp., namely Texas bluebonnet, L. texensis)
- Insect: Monarch butterfly (Danaus plexippus)
- Mammal: Texas longhorn, Mexican long-nosed armadillo (Dasypus mexicanus)
- Mushroom: Texas star (Chorioactis geaster)
- Reptile: Texas horned lizard (Phrynosoma cornutum)
- Tree: Pecan (Carya illinoinensis)

Inanimate insignia
- Food: Chili
- Game: Texas 42 dominoes
- Instrument: Guitar
- Shell: Lightning whelk (Busycon perversum pulleyi)
- Ship: USS Texas
- Soil: Houston Black
- Sport: Rodeo
- Other: Molecule: Buckyball (For more, see article)

State route marker

State quarter
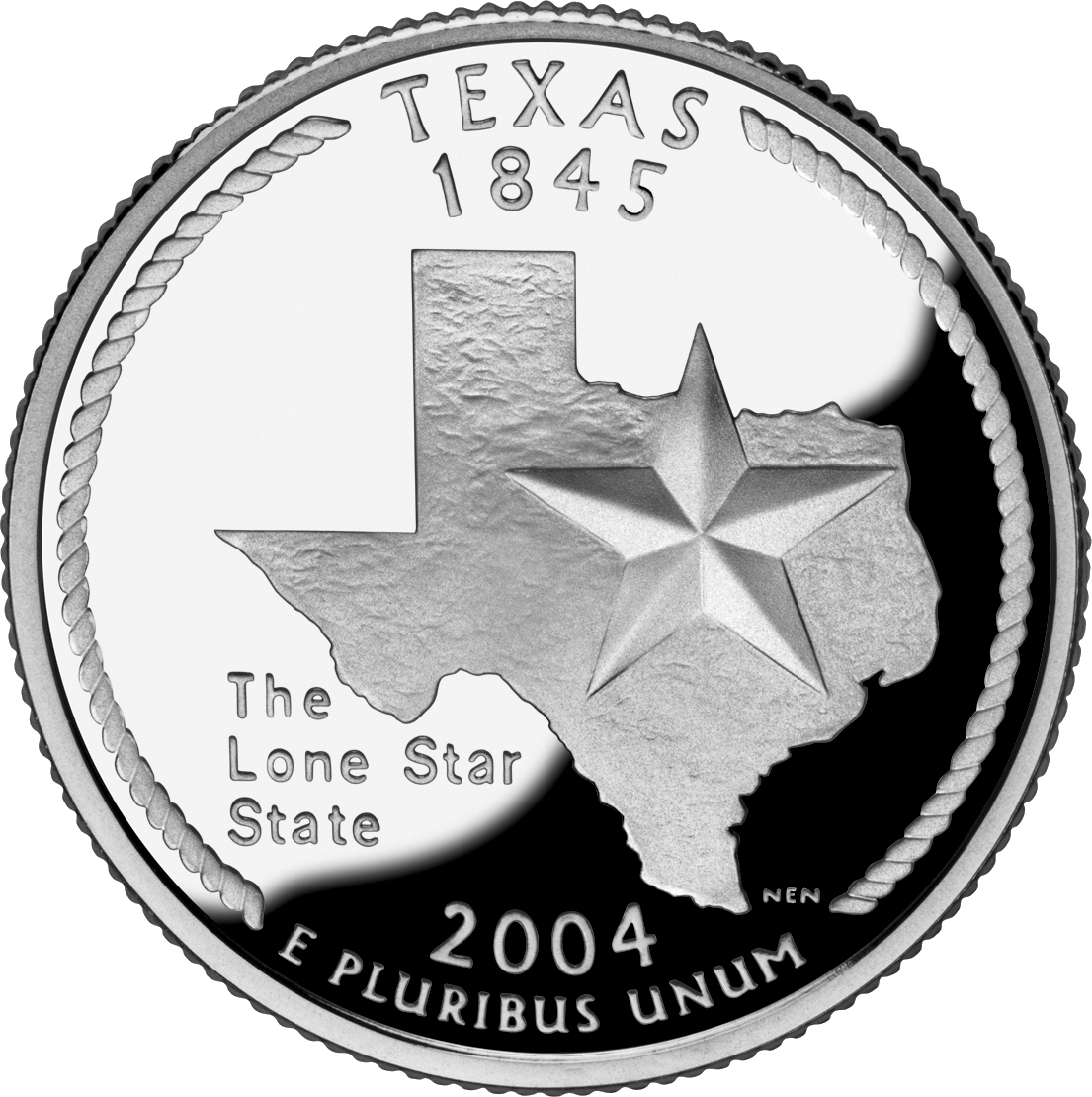
- Released in 2004

Not all Texans favored secession initially, although many of the same would later support the Southern cause. Texas's most notable Unionist was the state governor, Sam Houston. Not wanting to aggravate the situation, Houston refused two offers from President Lincoln for Union troops to keep him in office. After refusing to swear an oath of allegiance to the Confederacy, Houston was deposed.

While far from the major battlefields of the American Civil War, Texas contributed large numbers of soldiers and equipment. Union troops briefly occupied the state's primary port, Galveston. Texas's border with Mexico was known as the "backdoor of the Confederacy" because trade occurred at the border, bypassing the Union blockade. The Confederacy repulsed all Union attempts to shut down this route, but Texas's role as a supply state was marginalized in mid-1863 after the Union capture of the Mississippi River. The final battle of the Civil War was fought at Palmito Ranch, near Brownsville, Texas, and saw a Confederate victory.

Texas descended into anarchy for two months between the surrender of the Army of Northern Virginia and the assumption of authority by Union General Gordon Granger. Violence marked the early months of Reconstruction. Juneteenth commemorates the announcement of the Emancipation Proclamation in Galveston by General Gordon Granger, almost two and a half years after the original announcement. President Johnson, in 1866, declared the civilian government restored in Texas. Despite not meeting Reconstruction requirements, Congress resumed allowing elected Texas representatives into the federal government in 1870. Social volatility continued as the state struggled with agricultural depression and labor issues.

Like most of the South, the Texas economy was devastated by the War. However, since the state had not been as dependent on slaves as other parts of the South, it was able to recover more quickly. The culture in Texas during the later 19th century exhibited many facets of a frontier territory. The state became notorious as a haven for people from other parts of the country who wanted to escape debt, war tensions, or other problems. "Gone to Texas" was a common expression for those fleeing the law in other states. Nevertheless, the state also attracted many businessmen and other settlers with more legitimate interests.

The cattle industry continued to thrive, though it gradually became less profitable. Cotton and lumber became major industries creating new economic booms in various regions. Railroad networks grew rapidly as did the port at Galveston as commerce expanded. The lumber industry quickly expanded and was Texas's largest industry prior to the 20th century.

=== Early to mid-20th century ===
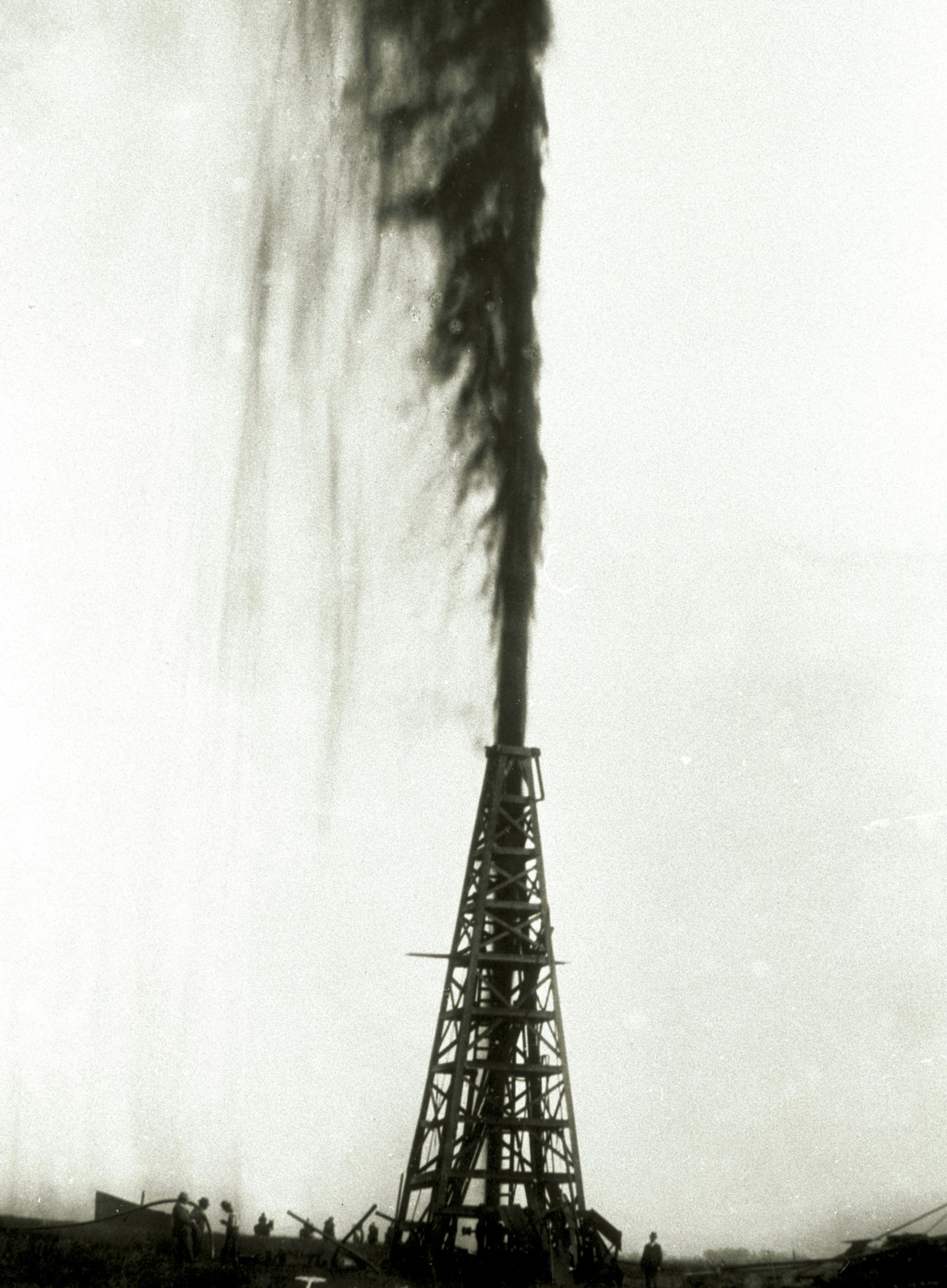
Spindletop, the first major oil gusher

In 1900, Texas suffered the deadliest natural disaster in U.S. history in the form of the Galveston hurricane. The fortunes of the state would turn around in 1901, with discovery of the first major oil well in Texas, on January 10th 1901. Spindletop, was found south of Beaumont. Other fields were later discovered nearby in East Texas, West Texas, and under the Gulf of Mexico. The resulting "oil boom" transformed Texas. Oil production averaged three million barrels per day at its peak in 1972.

In 1901, the Democratic-dominated state legislature passed a bill requiring payment of a poll tax for voting, which effectively disenfranchised most Black and many poor White and Latino people. In addition, the legislature established white primaries, ensuring minorities were excluded from the formal political process. The number of voters dropped dramatically, and the Democrats crushed competition from the Republican and Populist parties. The Socialist Party became the second-largest party in Texas after 1912, coinciding with a large socialist upsurge in the United States during fierce battles in the labor movement and the popularity of national heroes like Eugene V. Debs. The socialists' popularity soon waned after their vilification by the federal government for their opposition to U.S. involvement in World War I.

The Great Depression and the Dust Bowl dealt a double blow to the state's economy, which had significantly improved since the Civil War. Migrants abandoned the worst-hit sections of Texas during the Dust Bowl years. Especially from this period on, Black people left Texas in the Great Migration to seek work in the Northern United States or California and to escape segregation. In 1940, Texas was 74% White, 14.4% Black, and 11.5% Hispanic.

World War II had a dramatic impact on Texas, as federal money poured in to build military bases, munitions factories, detention camps and Army hospitals; 750,000 Texans left for service; the cities exploded with new industry; and hundreds of thousands of poor farmers left the fields for service or much better-paying war jobs, never to return to agriculture. Texas manufactured 3.1 percent of total United States military armaments produced during World War II, ranking eleventh among the 48 states.

Texas modernized and expanded its system of higher education through the 1960s. The state created a comprehensive plan for higher education, funded in large part by oil revenues, and a central state apparatus designed to manage state institutions more efficiently. These changes helped Texas universities receive federal research funds.

=== Mid-20th to early 21st century ===
From around the mid-20th century, Texas began to transform from a rural and agricultural state to one urban and industrialized. The state's population grew quickly during this period, with large levels of migration from outside the state. As a part of the Sun Belt, Texas experienced strong economic growth, particularly during the 1970s and early 1980s. Texas's economy diversified, lessening its reliance on the petroleum industry. By 1990, Hispanics and Latino Americans overtook Blacks to become the largest minority group. Texas has the largest Black population with over 3.9 million.

During the late 20th century, the Republican Party replaced the Democratic Party as the dominant party in the state. Beginning in the early 21st century, metropolitan areas including Dallas–Fort Worth and Greater Austin became centers for the Texas Democratic Party in statewide and national elections as liberal policies became more accepted in urban areas.

From the mid-2000s to 2019, Texas gained an influx of business relocations and regional headquarters from companies in California. Texas became a major destination for migration during the early 21st century and was named the most popular state to move for three consecutive years. Another study in 2019 determined Texas's growth rate at 1,000 people per day. During the COVID-19 pandemic in Texas, Texas was one of the states to resist the imposition of repeated lockdowns.

During February 13–17, 2021, the state faced a major weather emergency as Winter Storm Uri hit the state, as well as most of the Southeastern and Midwestern United States. Historically high power usage across the state caused the state's power grid to become overworked and ERCOT (the main operator of the Texas Interconnection grid) declared an emergency and began to implement rolling blackouts across Texas, causing a power crisis. Over 3 million Texans were without power and over 4 million were under boil-water notices.

In the 2026 midterm elections, the Democratic Party won every major statewide race in Texas, including electing Gina Hinojosa as governor. James Talarico became the first Democrat to win a U.S. Senate election in Texas since 1988.

== Geography ==
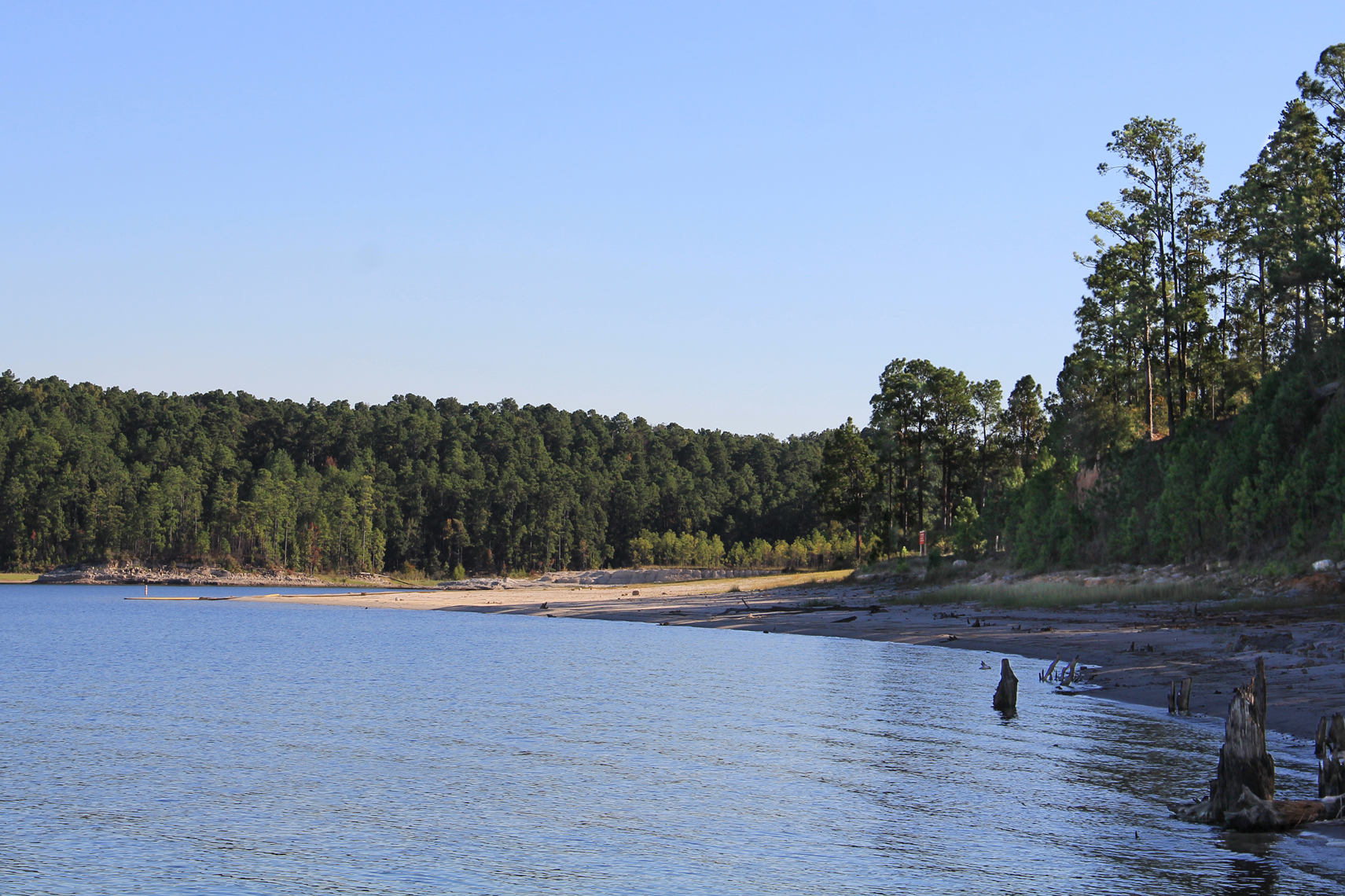
Sam Rayburn Reservoir

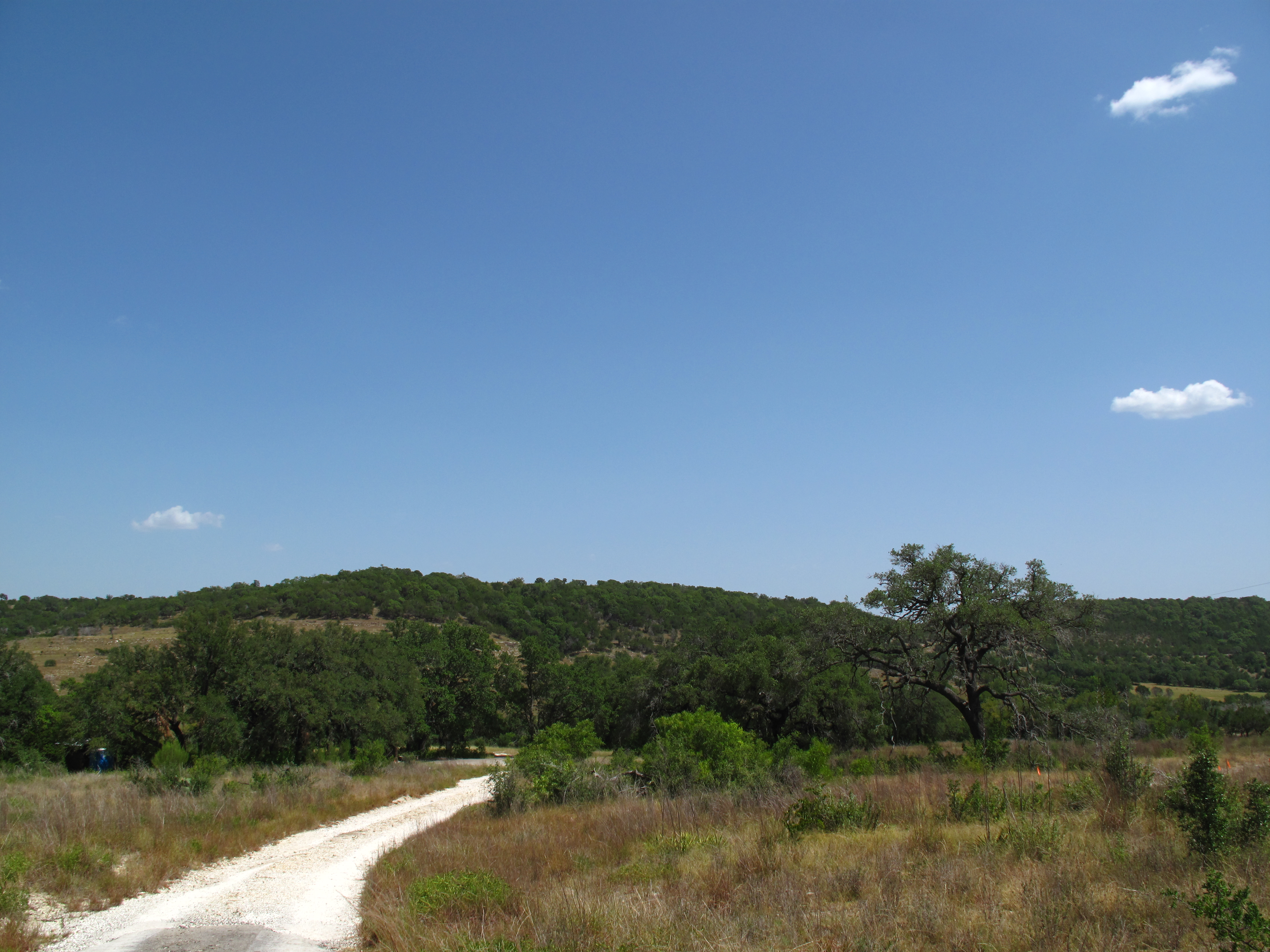
Texas Hill Country

Texas is the second-largest U.S. state by area, after Alaska, and the largest state within the contiguous United States, at 268,820 square miles (696,200 km^{2}). If it were an independent country, Texas would be the 39th-largest. It ranks 26th worldwide amongst country subdivisions by size.

Texas is in the south central part of the United States. The Rio Grande forms a natural border with the Mexican states of Chihuahua, Coahuila, Nuevo León, and Tamaulipas to the south. The Red River forms a natural border with Oklahoma and Arkansas to the north. The Sabine River forms a natural border with Louisiana to the east. The Texas Panhandle has an eastern border with Oklahoma at 100° W, a northern border with Oklahoma at 36°30' N and a western border with New Mexico at 103° W. El Paso lies on the state's western tip at 32° N and the Rio Grande.

Texas has 10 climatic regions, 14 soil regions and 11 distinct ecological regions. One classification system divides Texas, in order from southeast to west, into the following: Gulf Coastal Plains, Interior Lowlands, Great Plains, and Basin and Range Province.

The Gulf Coastal Plains region wraps around the Gulf of Mexico on the southeast section of the state. Vegetation in this region consists of thick piney woods. The Interior Lowlands region consists of gently rolling to hilly forested land and is part of a larger pine-hardwood forest. The Cross Timbers region and Caprock Escarpment are part of the Interior Lowlands.

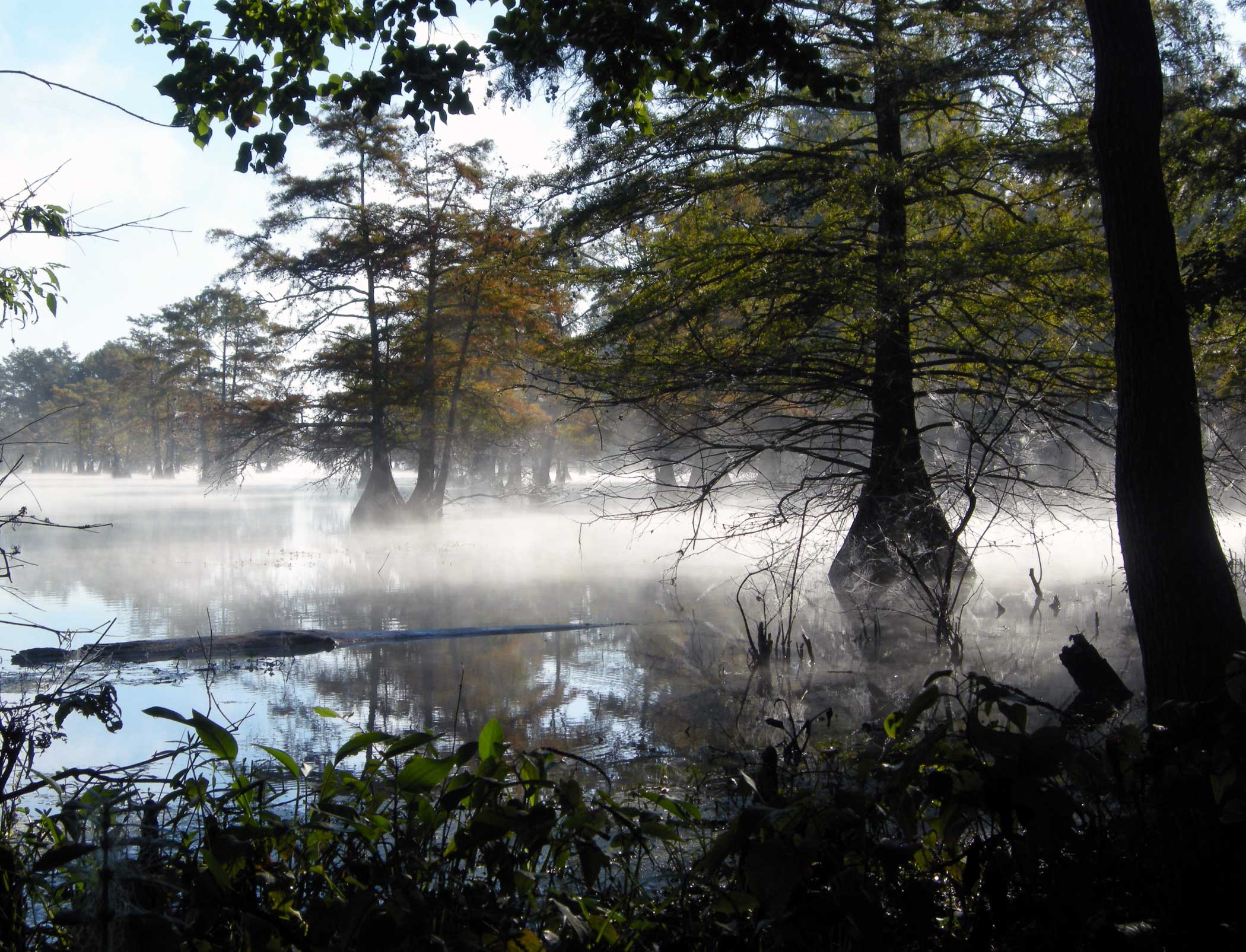
Steinhagen Reservoir

The Great Plains region in Central Texas spans through the state's panhandle and Llano Estacado to the state's hill country near Lago Vista and Austin. This region is dominated by prairie and steppe. "Far West Texas" or the "Trans-Pecos" region is the state's Basin and Range Province. The most varied of the regions, this area includes Sand Hills, the Stockton Plateau, desert valleys, wooded mountain slopes and desert grasslands.

Texas has 3,700 named streams and 15 major rivers, with the Rio Grande as the largest. Other major rivers include the Pecos, the Brazos, Colorado, and Red River. While Texas has few natural lakes, Texans have built more than a hundred artificial reservoirs.

The size and unique history of Texas make its regional affiliation debatable; it can be considered a Southern or a Southwestern state, or both. The vast geographic, economic, and cultural diversity within the state itself prohibits easy categorization of the whole state into a recognized region of the United States. Notable extremes range from East Texas which is often considered an extension of the Deep South, to Far West Texas which is generally acknowledged to be part of the interior Southwest.

=== Geology ===
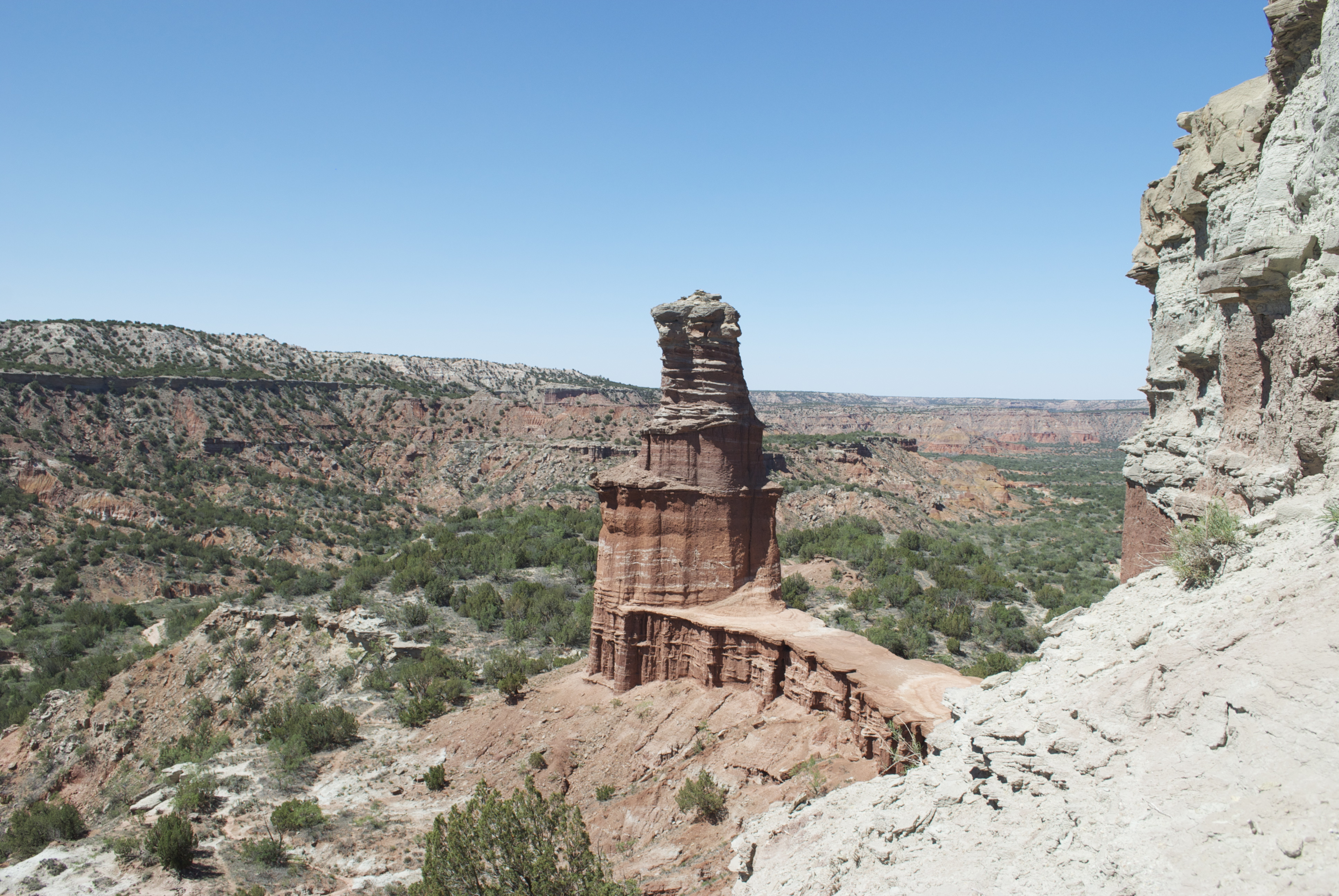
Palo Duro Canyon

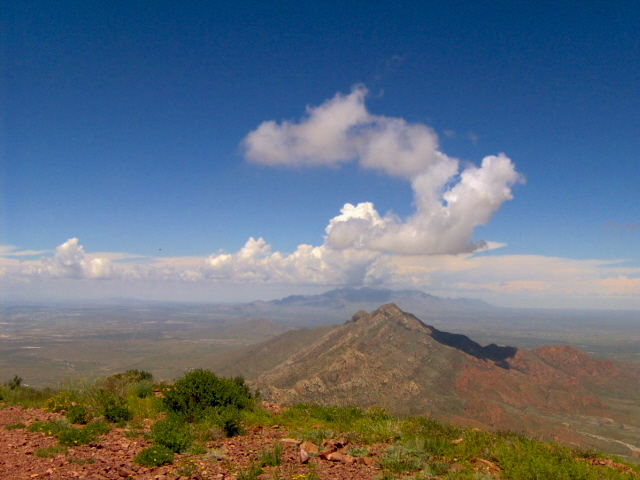
Franklin Mountains State Park

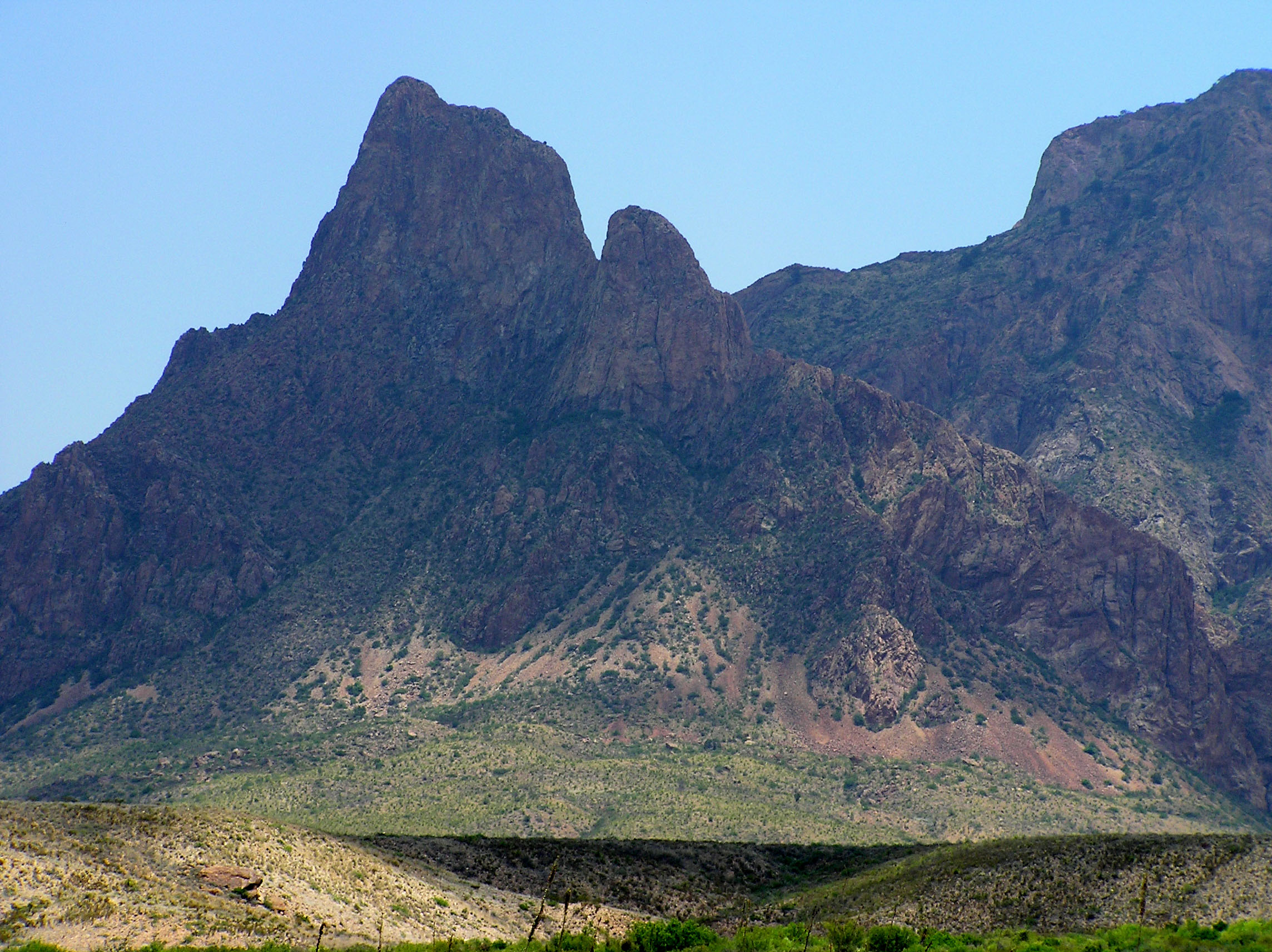
Big Bend National Park

Texas is the southernmost part of the Great Plains, which ends in the south against the folded Sierra Madre Occidental of Mexico. The continental crust forms a stable Mesoproterozoic craton which changes across a broad continental margin and transitional crust into true oceanic crust of the Gulf of Mexico. The oldest rocks in Texas date from the Mesoproterozoic and are about 1,600 million years old.

The margin created by the continental crust existed until Laurasia and Gondwana collided in the Pennsylvanian subperiod to form Pangea. Pangea began to break up in the Triassic, but seafloor spreading to form the Gulf of Mexico occurred only in the mid- and late Jurassic. The shoreline shifted again to the eastern margin of the state and the Gulf of Mexico's passive margin began to form. Today 9 to 12 miles (14 to 19 km) of sediments are buried beneath the Texas continental shelf and a large proportion of remaining US oil reserves are here. The incipient Gulf of Mexico basin was restricted and seawater often evaporated completely to form thick evaporite deposits of Jurassic age. These salt deposits formed salt dome diapirs, and are found in East Texas along the Gulf coast.

East Texas outcrops consist of Cretaceous and Paleogene sediments which contain important deposits of Eocene lignite. The Mississippian and Pennsylvanian sediments in the north; Permian sediments in the west; and Cretaceous sediments in the east, along the Gulf coast and out on the Texas continental shelf contain oil. Oligocene volcanic rocks are found in far west Texas in the Big Bend area. A blanket of Miocene sediments known as the Ogallala formation in the western high plains region is an important aquifer. Located far from an active plate tectonic boundary, Texas has no volcanoes and few earthquakes.

=== Wildlife ===
Texas is home to 65 species of mammals, 213 species of reptiles and amphibians, including the American green tree frog, and the greatest diversity of bird life in the United States—590 native species in all. At least 12 species have been introduced and now reproduce freely in Texas.

Texas plays host to several species of wasps, including an abundance of Polistes exclamans, and is an important ground for the study of Polistes annularis.

During the spring Texas wildflowers such as the state flower, the bluebonnet, line highways throughout Texas. During the Johnson Administration the first lady, Lady Bird Johnson, worked to draw attention to Texas wildflowers.

=== Climate ===
Köppen climate types in Texas

The large size of Texas and its location at the intersection of multiple climate zones gives the state highly variable weather. The Panhandle of the state has colder winters than North Texas, while the Gulf Coast has mild winters. Texas has wide variations in precipitation patterns. El Paso, on the western end of the state, averages 8.7 inches (220 mm) of annual rainfall, while parts of southeast Texas average as much as 64 inches (1,600 mm) per year. Dallas in the North Central region averages a more moderate 37 inches (940 mm) per year.

Snow falls multiple times each winter in the Panhandle and mountainous areas of West Texas, once or twice a year in North Texas, and once every few years in Central and East Texas. Snow falls south of San Antonio or on the coast only in rare circumstances. Of note is the 2004 Christmas Eve snowstorm, when 6 inches (150 mm) of snow fell as far south as Kingsville, where the average high temperature in December is 65 °F.

Night-time summer temperatures range from the upper 50s °F (14 °C) in the West Texas mountains to 80 °F (27 °C) in Galveston.

The table below consists of averages for August (generally the warmest month) and January (generally the coldest) in selected cities in various regions of the state.

Average daily maximum and minimum temperatures for selected cities in Texas
Location	August (°F)	August (°C)	January (°F)	January (°C)
Houston	94/75	34/24	63/54	17/12
San Antonio	96/74	35/23	63/40	17/5
Dallas	96/77	36/25	57/37	16/3
Austin	97/74	36/23	61/45	16/5
El Paso	92/67	33/21	57/32	14/0
Laredo	100/77	37/25	67/46	19/7
Amarillo	89/64	32/18	50/23	10/−4
Brownsville	94/76	34/24	70/51	21/11

==== Storms ====
Thunderstorms strike Texas often, especially the eastern and northern portions of the state. Tornado Alley covers the northern section of Texas. The state experiences the most tornadoes in the United States, an average of 139 a year. These strike most frequently in North Texas and the Panhandle. Tornadoes in Texas generally occur in April, May, and June.

Some of the most destructive hurricanes in U.S. history have seriously impacted Texas. A hurricane in 1875 killed about 400 people in Indianola, followed by another hurricane in 1886 that destroyed the town. These events meant that Galveston took over as the chief port city. The 1900 Galveston hurricane subsequently devastated that city, killing a number estimated at from 8,000 to 12,000 in the deadliest natural disaster in U.S. history. In 2017, Hurricane Harvey caused a landfall in Rockport as a Category 4 Hurricane, causing significant damage, with its unprecedented amounts of rain over the Greater Houston area resulting in widespread and catastrophic flooding, affecting hundreds of thousands of homes. Harvey ultimately became the costliest hurricane worldwide, causing an estimated $198.6 billion in damage, surpassing the cost of Hurricane Katrina.

Other devastating Texas hurricanes include the 1915 Galveston hurricane, Hurricane Audrey in 1957, Hurricane Carla in 1961, Hurricane Beulah in 1967, Hurricane Alicia in 1983, Hurricane Rita in 2005, and Hurricane Ike in 2008. Tropical storms have also caused their share of damage: Allison in 1989 and again during 2001, Claudette in 1979, and Tropical Storm Imelda in 2019.

There is no substantial physical barrier between Texas and the polar region, and although rare, it is possible for arctic or polar air masses to penetrate Texas, as occurred during the February 13–17, 2021 North American winter storm. Usually, prevailing winds in North America push polar air masses to the southeast before they reach Texas. Because such incidents are rare, and, generally unexpected, they may result in crises such as the 2021 Texas power crisis.

=== Greenhouse gases ===
As of 2017, Texas emitted the most greenhouse gases in the U.S. As of 2017 the state emits about 1,600 billion pounds (707 million metric tons) of carbon dioxide annually. As an independent state, Texas would rank as the world's seventh-largest producer of greenhouse gases. Causes of the state's vast greenhouse gas emissions include the state's large number of coal power plants and the state's refining and manufacturing industries. In 2010, there were 2,553 "emission events" which poured 44.6 million pounds (20,200 metric tons) of contaminants into the Texas sky.

=== Administrative divisions ===
Largest city in Texas by year
Year(s)	City
1850–1870	San Antonio
1870–1890	Galveston
1890–1900	Dallas
1900–1930	San Antonio
1930–present	Houston

Texas Counties and municipalities

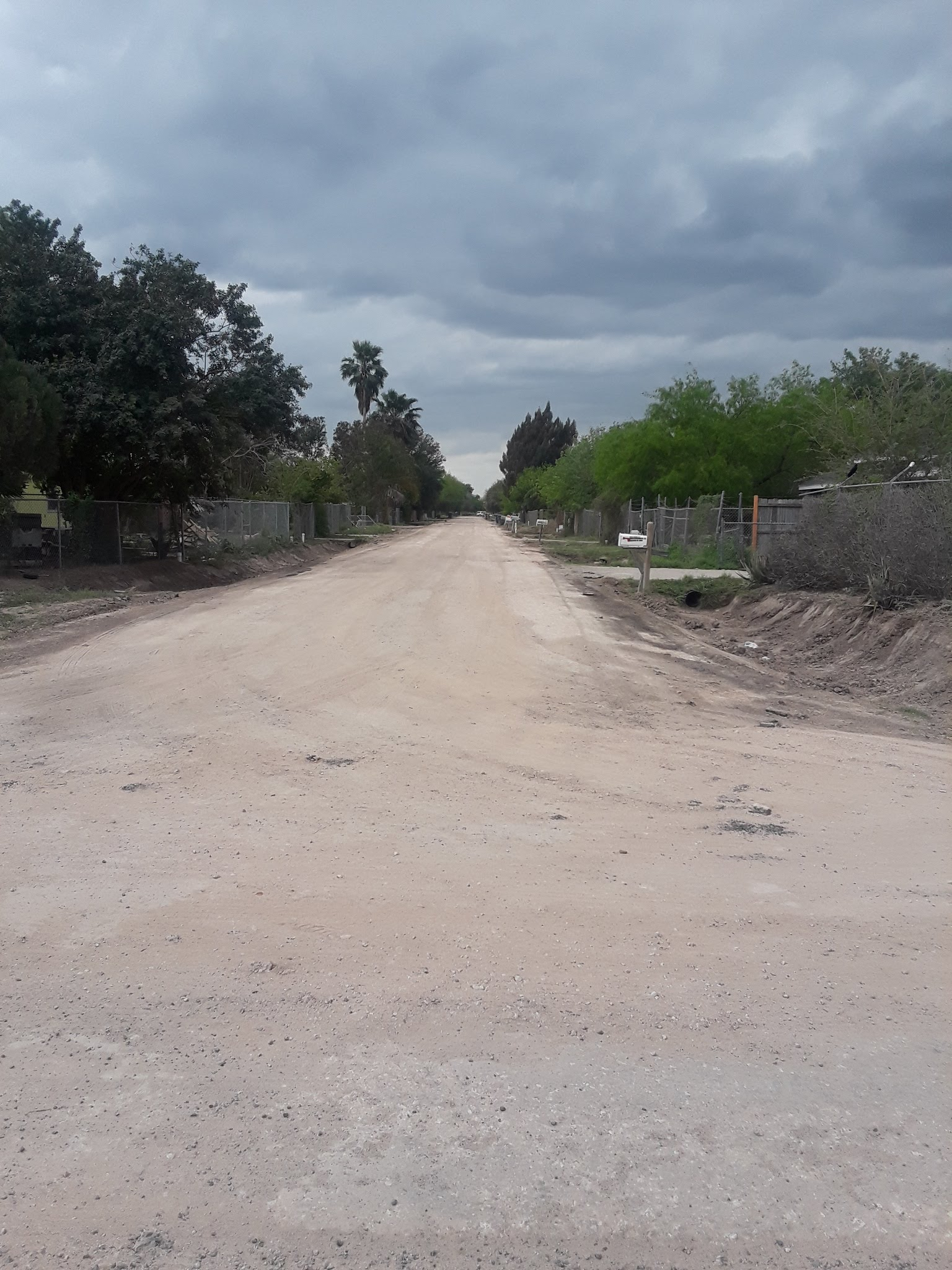
Colonia in the Rio Grande Valley near the Mexico–United States border

The state has three cities with populations exceeding one million: Houston, San Antonio, and Dallas. These three rank among the 10 most populous cities of the United States. As of 2020, six Texas cities had populations greater than 600,000. Austin, Fort Worth, and El Paso are among the 20 largest U.S. cities. Texas has four metropolitan areas with populations greater than a million: Dallas–Fort Worth–Arlington, Houston–Sugar Land–The Woodlands, San Antonio–New Braunfels, and Austin–Round Rock–San Marcos. The Dallas–Fort Worth and Houston metropolitan areas number about 7.5 million and 7 million residents as of 2019, respectively.

Three interstate highways—I-35 to the west (Dallas–Fort Worth to San Antonio, with Austin in between), I-45 to the east (Dallas to Houston), and I-10 to the south (San Antonio to Houston) define the Texas Urban Triangle region. The region of 60,000 square miles (160,000 km^{2}) contains most of the state's largest cities and metropolitan areas as well as 17 million people, nearly 75 percent of Texas's total population. Houston and Dallas have been recognized as world cities. These cities are spread out amongst the state.

In contrast to the cities, unincorporated rural settlements known as colonias often lack basic infrastructure and are marked by poverty. The office of the Texas Attorney General stated, in 2011, that Texas had about 2,294 colonias, and estimates about 500,000 lived in the colonias. Hidalgo County, as of 2011, has the largest number of colonias. Texas has the largest number of people living in colonias of all states.

Texas has 254 counties, more than any other state. Each county runs on Commissioners' Court system consisting of four elected commissioners (one from each of four precincts in the county, roughly divided according to population) and a county judge elected at large from the entire county. County government runs similar to a "weak" mayor-council system; the county judge has no veto authority, but votes along with the other commissioners.

Although Texas permits cities and counties to enter "interlocal agreements" to share services, the state does not allow consolidated city-county governments, nor does it have metropolitan governments. Counties are not granted home rule status; their powers are strictly defined by state law. The state does not have townships—areas within a county are either incorporated or unincorporated. Incorporated areas are part of a municipality. The county provides limited services to unincorporated areas and to some smaller incorporated areas. Municipalities are classified either "general law" cities or "home rule". A municipality may elect home rule status once it exceeds 5,000 population with voter approval.

Texas also permits the creation of "special districts", which provide limited services. The most common is the school district, but can also include hospital districts, community college districts, and utility districts. Municipal, school district, and special district elections are nonpartisan, though the party affiliation of a candidate may be well-known. County and state elections are partisan.

Largest cities or towns in Texas 2022 U.S. Census Bureau Estimate
Rank	Name	County	Pop.	Rank	Name	County	Pop.
1	Houston	Harris	2,302,878	11	Laredo	Webb	256,187
2	San Antonio	Bexar	1,472,909	12	Irving	Dallas	254,715
3	Dallas	Dallas	1,299,544	13	Garland	Dallas	240,854
4	Austin	Travis	974,447	14	Frisco	Collin	219,587
5	Fort Worth	Tarrant	956,709	15	McKinney	Collin	207,507
6	El Paso	El Paso	677,456	16	Grand Prairie	Dallas	201,843
7	Arlington	Tarrant	394,602	17	Amarillo	Potter	201,291
8	Corpus Christi	Nueces	316,239	18	Brownsville	Cameron	189,382
9	Plano	Collin	289,547	19	Killeen	Bell	159,172
10	Lubbock	Lubbock	263,930	20	Denton	Denton	150,353

== Demographics ==
Historical population
Census	Pop.	Note	%±
1850	212,592		—
1860	604,215		184.2%
1870	818,579		35.5%
1880	1,591,749		94.5%
1890	2,235,527		40.4%
1900	3,048,710		36.4%
1910	3,896,542		27.8%
1920	4,663,228		19.7%
1930	5,824,715		24.9%
1940	6,414,824		10.1%
1950	7,711,194		20.2%
1960	9,579,677		24.2%
1970	11,196,730		16.9%
1980	14,229,191		27.1%
1990	16,986,510		19.4%
2000	20,851,820		22.8%
2010	25,145,561		20.6%
2020	29,145,505		15.9%
2025 (est.)	31,709,821		8.8%
1910–2020

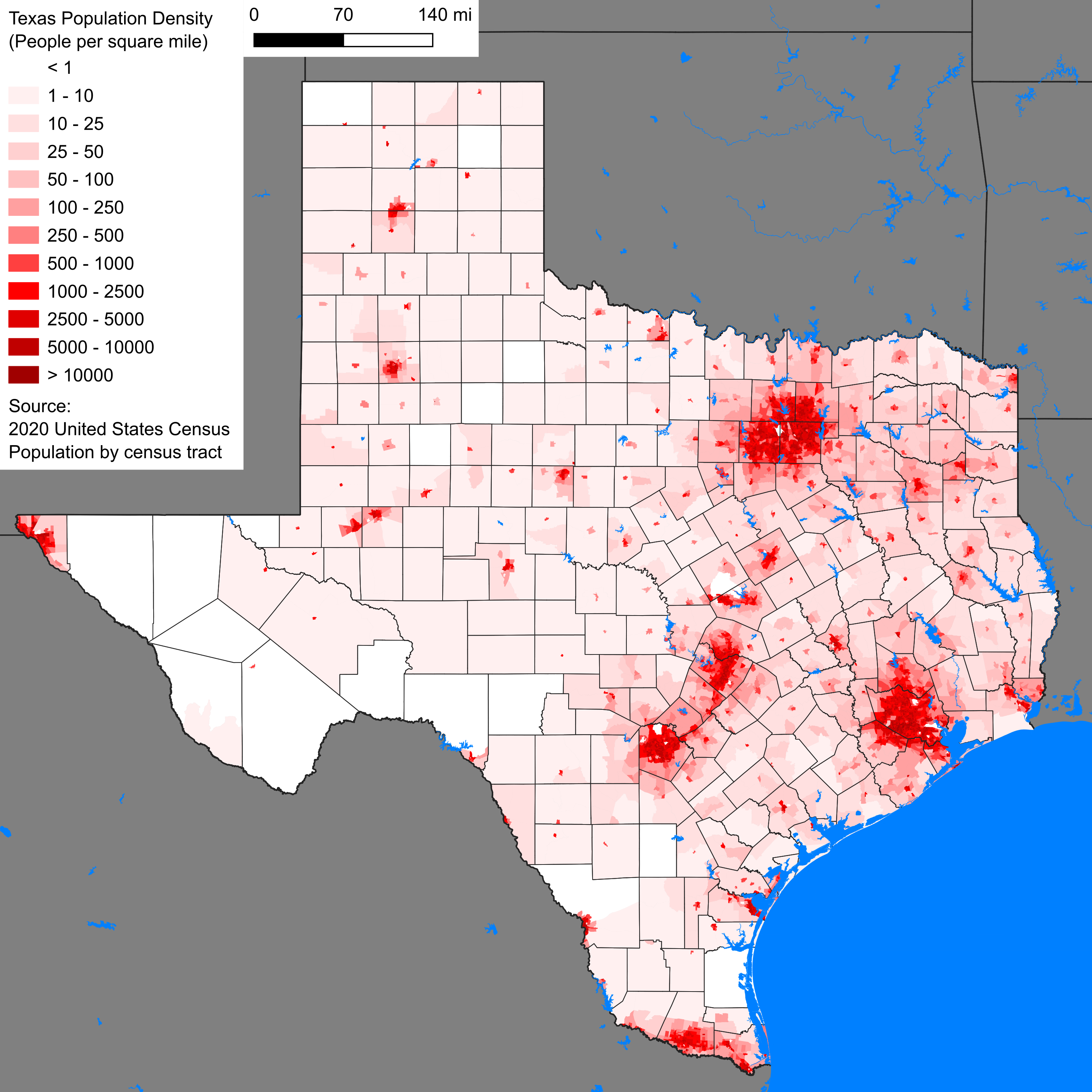
Texas population density map

The resident population of Texas was 29,145,505 in the 2020 census, a 15.9% increase since the 2010 census. At the 2020 census, the apportioned population of Texas stood at 29,183,290. The U.S. Census Bureau estimated the population was 31,290,831 as of July 1, 2024, an increase of 7.4% since the 2020 census. Texas is the second-most populous state in the United States after California and the only other U.S. state to surpass a total estimated population of 30 million people as of July 2, 2022.

In 2015, Texas had 4.7 million foreign-born residents, about 17% of the population and 21.6% of the state workforce. The major countries of origin for Texan immigrants were Mexico (55.1% of immigrants), India (5%), El Salvador (4.3%), Vietnam (3.7%), and China (2.3%). Of immigrant residents, 35.8 percent were naturalized U.S. citizens. As of 2018, the population increased to 4.9 million foreign-born residents or 17.2% of the state population, up from 2,899,642 in 2000.

In 2014, there were an estimated 1.7 million undocumented immigrants in Texas, making up 35% of the total Texas immigrant population and 6.1% of the total state population. In addition to the state's foreign-born population, 4.1 million Texans (15% of the state's population) were born in the United States yet had at least one immigrant parent. According to the American Community Survey's 2019 estimates, 1,739,000 residents were undocumented immigrants, a decrease of 103,000 since 2014 but an increase of 142,000 since 2016. Of the undocumented immigrant population, 951,000 had resided in Texas no more than 14 years; an estimated 788,000 had lived in Texas for 15 or more years.

Texas's Rio Grande Valley has seen significant migration from across the U.S.–Mexico border. During the 2014 crisis, many Central Americans, including unaccompanied minors traveling alone from Guatemala, Honduras, and El Salvador, reached the state, overwhelming Border Patrol resources for a time. Many sought asylum in the United States.

Texas's population density as of 2020 is 110 people per square mile (42 people/km^{2}) which is slightly higher than the average population density of the U.S. as a whole, at 93 people per square mile (36 people/km^{2}). In contrast, while Texas and France are similarly sized geographically, the European country has a population density of 256 people per square mile (99 people/km^{2}). Using population-weighted density (Note: Mean of density in 1mi radii circles around each person), Texas has a density of 3,604 people per square mile (1,392 people/km^{2}), lower than the U.S. average, at 5,217 people per square mile (2,014 people/km^{2}). Two-thirds of all Texans live in major metropolitan areas such as Houston.

According to HUD's 2022 Annual Homeless Assessment Report, there were an estimated 24,432 homeless people in Texas.

=== Race and ethnicity ===
Map of counties in Texas by racial and ethnic plurality, per the 2020 U.S. census: Non-Hispanic White 20–30% 30–40% 40–50% 50–60% 60–70% 70–80% 80–90% / Hispanic or Latino 40–50% 50–60% 60–70% 70–80% 80–90% 90%+

Ethnic composition as of the 2020 census
Race and ethnicity	Alone	Total
Hispanic or Latino (Note: Persons of Hispanic or Latino origin are not distinguished between total and partial ancestry.)	—	40.2%
Non-Hispanic White	39.7%	39.8%
African American	11.8%	12.8%
Asian	5.4%	6.1%
Native American	0.3%	1.4%
Pacific Islander	0.1%	0.2%
Other	0.4%	1.0%

Texas – racial and ethnic composition Note: The U.S. Census treats Hispanic/Latino as an ethnic category. This table excludes Latinos from the racial categories and assigns them to a separate category. Hispanics/Latinos may be of any race.
Race / Ethnicity (NH = Non-Hispanic)	Pop 2000	Pop 2010	Pop 2020	% 2000	% 2010	% 2020
White alone (NH)	10,933,313	11,397,345	11,584,597	52.43%	45.33%	39.75%
Black or African American alone (NH)	2,364,255	2,886,825	3,444,712	11.34%	11.48%	11.82%
Native American or Alaska Native alone (NH)	68,859	80,586	85,425	0.33%	0.32%	0.29%
Asian alone (NH)	554,445	948,426	1,561,518	2.66%	3.77%	5.36%
Pacific Islander alone (NH)	10,757	17,920	27,857	0.05%	0.07%	0.10%
Other race alone (NH)	19,958	33,980	113,584	0.10%	0.14%	0.39%
Mixed race or Multiracial (NH)	230,567	319,558	886,095	1.11%	1.27%	3.04%
Hispanic or Latino (any race)	6,669,666	9,460,921	11,441,717	31.99%	37.62%	39.26%
Total	20,851,820	25,145,561	29,145,505	100.00%	100.00%	100.00%

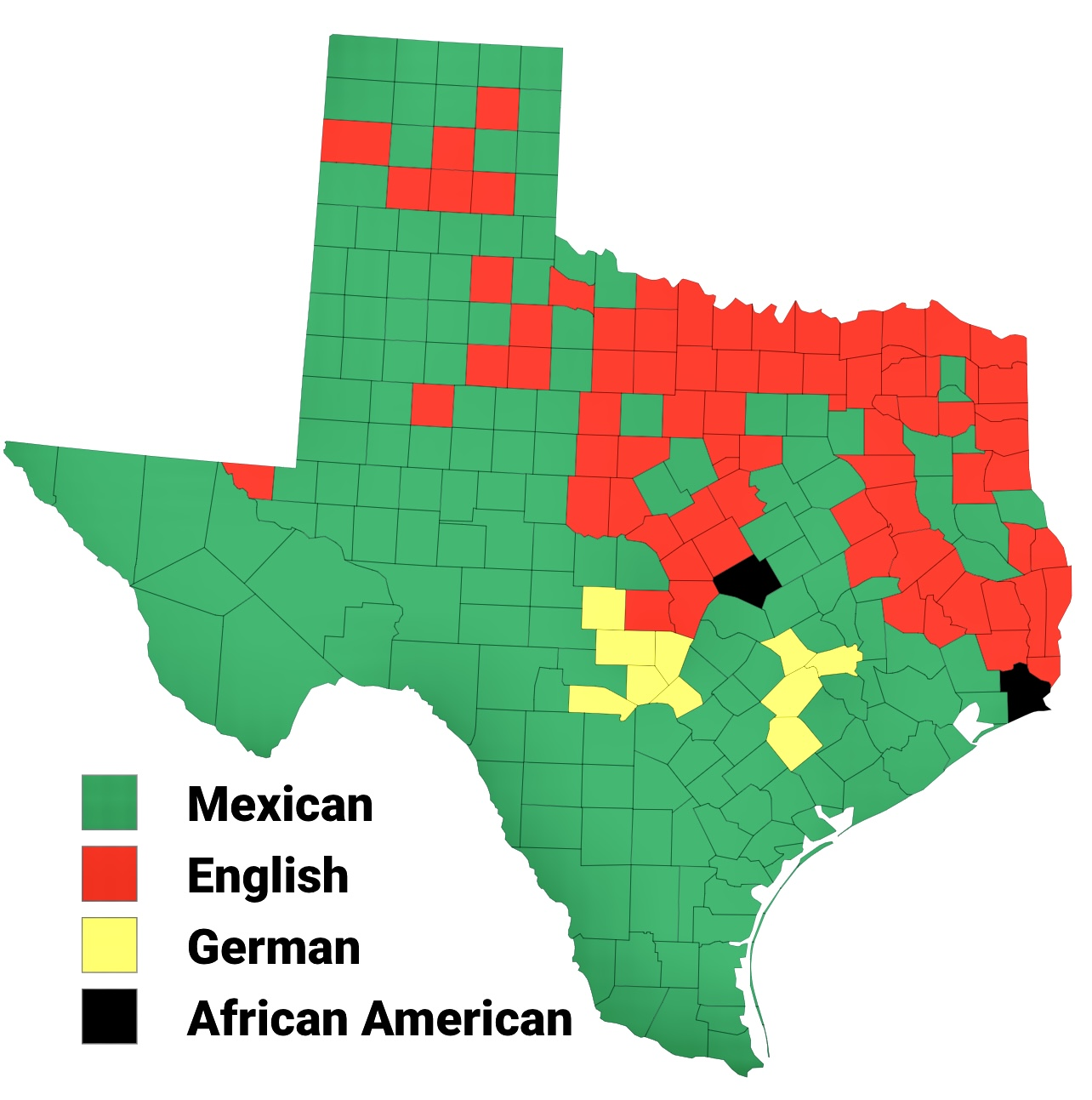
Largest alone or in any combination ethnic origin by county in Texas, per the 2020 census

In 2019, non-Hispanic Whites represented 41.2% of Texas's population, reflecting a national demographic shift. Black people made up 12.9%, American Indians and Alaska Natives 1.0%, Asian Americans 5.2%, Native Hawaiians and other Pacific Islanders 0.1%, some other race 0.2%, and two or more races 1.8%. Hispanics or Latino Americans of any race made up 39.7% of the estimated population.

At the 2020 census, the racial and ethnic composition of the state was 42.5% White (39.8% non-Hispanic White), 11.8% Black, 5.4% Asian, 0.3% American Indian and Alaska Native, 0.1% Native Hawaiian and other Pacific Islander, 13.6% some other race, 17.6% two or more races, and 40.2% Hispanic and Latino American of any race. Minority Americans make up 60.2% of the Texas population.

In 2010, 49% of all births were Hispanics; 35% were non-Hispanic White; 11.5% were non-Hispanic Black, and 4.3% were Asians/Pacific Islanders. Based on U.S. Census Bureau data released in February 2011, for the first time in recent history, Texas's White population is below 50% (45%) and Hispanics grew to 38%. Between 2000 and 2010, the total population grew by 20.6%, but Hispanics and Latino Americans grew by 65%, whereas non-Hispanic Whites grew by only 4.2%. Texas has the fifth highest rate of teenage births in the nation and a plurality of these are to Hispanics or Latinos. As of 2022, Hispanics and Latinos of any race replaced the non-Hispanic White population as the largest share of the state's population.

Texas has the second-largest share of Mexican Americans in the U.S., making up 32.2% of the total population and 80% of the state's Hispanic population. Other than Mexican, the largest self-reported ancestries in the state as of 2022 were German (8.1%), English (7.9%), Irish (5.8%), those identifying as American (4.6%), Italian (1.9%), Indian (1.9%), Salvadoran (1.4%), Scottish (1.3%), Vietnamese (1.1%), Chinese (1%), Puerto Rican (0.9%), Polish (0.9%), Honduran (0.8%), Filipino (0.8%), and Scotch-Irish (0.7%).

=== Languages ===
Most common non-English languages
Language	Population (as of 2010)
Spanish	29.2%
Vietnamese	0.8%
Chinese	0.6%
German	0.3%
Tagalog	0.3%
French	0.3%
Korean and Urdu (tied)	0.2%
Hindi	0.2%
Arabic	0.2%
Niger-Congo languages	0.2%

The most common accent or dialect spoken by natives throughout Texas is sometimes referred to as Texan English, itself a sub-variety of a broader category of American English known as Southern American English. Creole language is spoken in some parts of East Texas. In some areas of the state—particularly in the large cities—Western American English and General American English, is increasingly common. Chicano English—due to a growing Hispanic population—is widespread in South Texas, while African-American English is especially notable in historically minority areas of urban Texas.

At the 2020 American Community Survey's estimates, 64.9% of the population of Texas spoke only English, while 35.1% spoke a language other than English. Roughly 30% of the total population spoke Spanish. By 2021, approximately 50,546 Texans spoke French or a French-based creole language. German and other West Germanic languages were spoken by 49,565 residents; Russian, Polish, and other Slavic languages by 37,444; Korean by 31,673; Chinese 86,370; Vietnamese 92,410; Tagalog 40,124; and Arabic by 47,170 Texans.

At the census of 2010, 65.8% (14,740,304) of Texas residents age 5 and older spoke only English at home, while 29.2% (6,543,702) spoke Spanish, 0.8 percent (168,886) Vietnamese, and Chinese (which includes Cantonese and Mandarin) was spoken by 0.6% (122,921) of the population over five. Other languages spoken include German (including Texas German) by 0.3% (73,137), Tagalog with 0.3% (64,272) speakers, and French (including Cajun French) was spoken by 0.3% (55,773) of Texans. Reportedly, Cherokee is the most widely spoken Native American language in Texas. In total, 34.2% (7,660,406) of Texas's population aged five and older spoke a language at home other than English as of 2006.

=== Religion ===
Religious affiliation (2020)
Christian	75.5%
Catholic	28%
Protestant	47%
Other Christian	0.5%
Unaffiliated	20%
Jewish	1%
Muslim	1%
Buddhist	1%
Other faiths	5%

With the coming of Spanish Catholic and American Protestant missionary societies, American Indian religions and spiritual traditions dwindled. Since then, colonial and present-day Texas has become a predominantly Christian state, with 75.5% of the population identifying as such according to the Public Religion Research Institute in 2020.

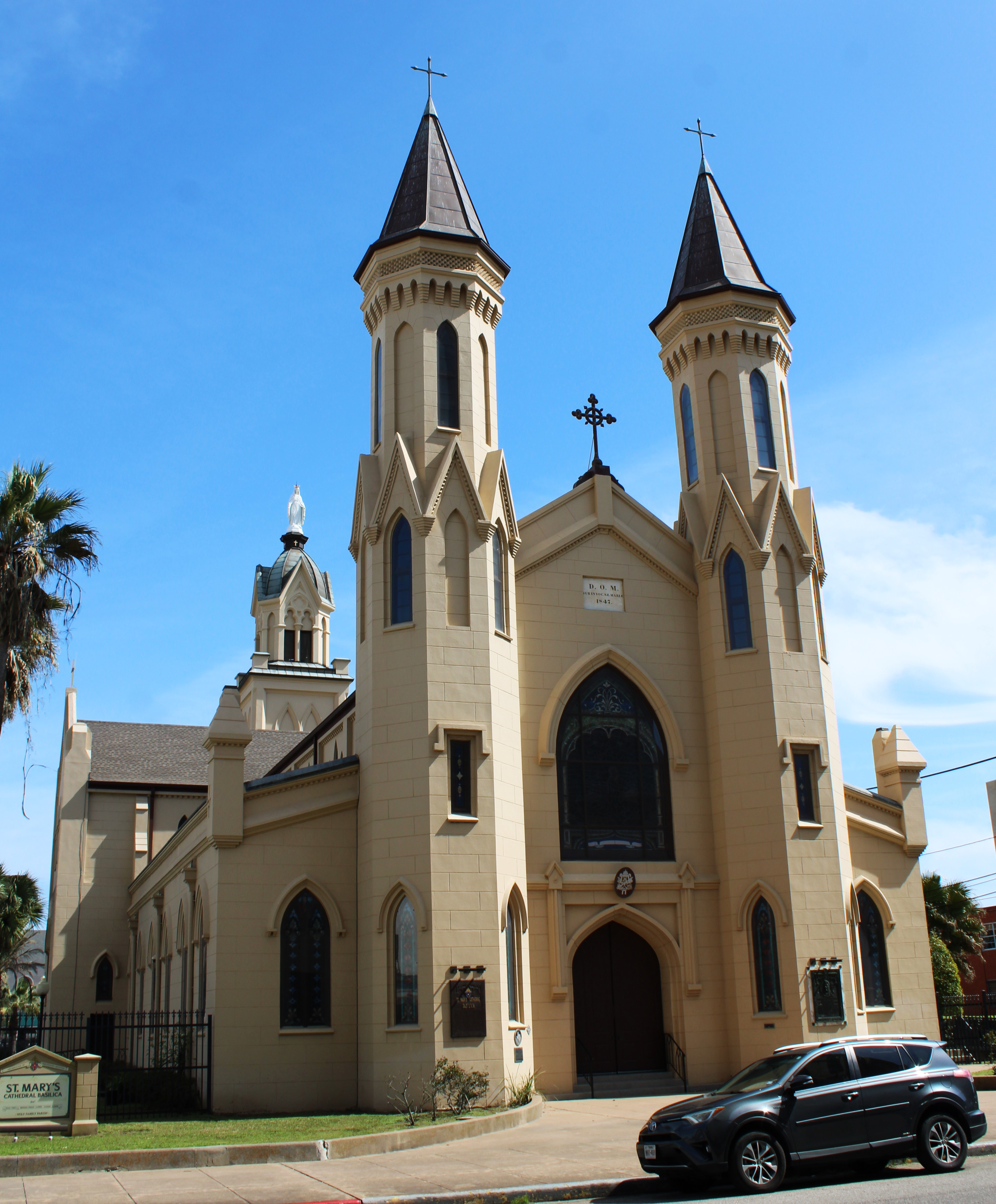
St. Mary's Cathedral Basilica of the Archdiocese of Galveston-Houston

Among its majority Christian populace, the largest Christian denomination as of 2014 has been the Catholic Church, per the Pew Research Center at 23% of the population, although Protestants collectively constituted 50% of the Christian population in 2014; in the 2020 study by the Public Religion Research Institute, the Catholic Church's membership increased to encompassing 28% of the population identifying with a religious or spiritual belief. At the 2020 Association of Religion Data Archives study, there were 5,905,142 Catholics in the state. The largest Catholic jurisdictions in Texas are the Archdiocese of Galveston–Houston—the first and oldest Latin Church diocese in Texas—the dioceses of Dallas and Fort Worth, and the Archdiocese of San Antonio.

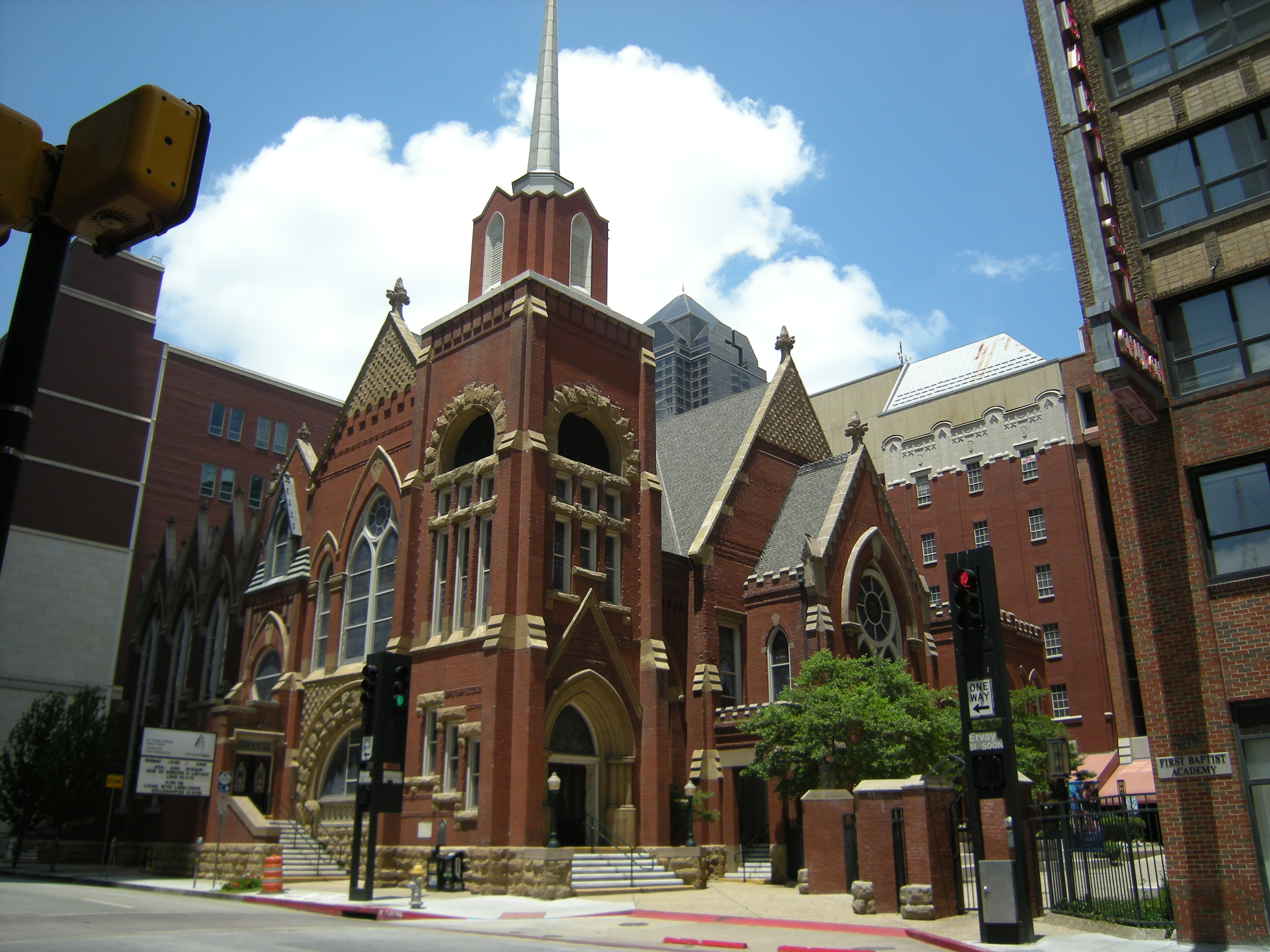
First Baptist Church of Dallas

Being part of the strongly, socially conservative Bible Belt, Protestants as a whole declined to 47% of the population in the 2020 study by the Public Religion Research Institute. Predominantly-white Evangelical Protestantism declined to 14% of the Protestant Christian population. Mainline Protestants in contrast made up 15% of Protestant Texas. Hispanic or Latino American-dominated Protestant churches and historically Black or African American Protestantism grew to a collective 13% of the Protestant population.

Evangelical Protestants were 31% of the population in 2014, and Baptists were the largest Evangelical tradition (14%); according to the 2014 study, they made up the second-largest Mainline Protestant group behind Methodists (4%). Nondenominational and interdenominational Protestant Christians were the second largest Evangelical group (7%) followed by Pentecostals (4%). The largest Evangelical Baptists in the state were the Southern Baptist Convention (9%) and independent Baptists (3%). The Assemblies of God USA was the largest Evangelical Pentecostal denomination in 2014. Among Mainline Protestants, the United Methodist Church was the largest denomination (4%) and the American Baptist Churches USA comprised the second-largest Mainline Protestant group (2%).

According to the Pew Research Center in 2014, the state's largest historically African American Christian denominations were the National Baptist Convention (USA) and the Church of God in Christ. Black Methodists and other Christians made up less than 1 percent each of the Christian demographic. Other Christians made up 1 percent of the total Christian population, and the Eastern and Oriental Orthodox formed less than 1 percent of the statewide Christian populace. The Church of Jesus Christ of Latter-day Saints is the largest nontrinitarian Christian group in Texas alongside the Jehovah's Witnesses.

Among its Protestant population, the Association of Religion Data Archives in 2020 determined Southern Baptists numbered 3,319,962; non-denominational Protestants 2,405,786 (including Christian Churches and Churches of Christ, and the Churches of Christ altogether numbering 2,758,353); and United Methodists 938,399 as the most numerous Protestant groups in the state. Baptists altogether (Southern Baptists, American Baptist Associates, American Baptists, Full Gospel Baptists, General Baptists, Free Will Baptists, National Baptists, National Baptists of America, National Missionary Baptists, National Primitive Baptists, and Progressive National Baptists) numbered 3,837,306; Methodists within United Methodism, the AME, AME Zion, CME, and the Free Methodist Church numbered 1,026,453 Texans.

The same study tabulated 425,038 Pentecostals spread among the Assemblies of God, Church of God (Cleveland), and Church of God in Christ. Nontrinitarian or Oneness Pentecostals numbered 7,042 between Bible Way Church of Our Lord Jesus Christ, COOLJC, and the Pentecostal Assemblies of the World. Other Christians, including the Eastern and Oriental Orthodox, numbered 55,329 altogether, and Episcopalians numbered 134,318, although the Anglican Catholic Church, Anglican Church in America, Anglican Church in North America, Anglican Province of America, and Holy Catholic Church Anglican Rite had a collective presence in 114 churches.

Non-Christian faiths accounted for 4% of the religious population in 2014, and 5% in 2020 per the Pew Research Center and Public Religion Research Institute. Adherents of many other religions reside predominantly in the urban centers of Texas. Judaism, Islam, and Buddhism were tied as the second largest religion as of 2014 and 2020. In 2014, 18% of the state's population were religiously unaffiliated. Of the unaffiliated in 2014, an estimated 2% were atheists and 3% agnostic; in 2020, the Public Religion Research Institute noted the largest non-Christian groups were the irreligious (20%), Judaism (1%), Islam (1%), Buddhism (1%) and Hinduism, and other religions at less than 1 percent each.

In 1990, the Islamic population was about 140,000 with more recent figures putting the current number of Muslims between 350,000 and 400,000 as of 2012. The Association of Religion Data Archives estimated there were 313,209 Muslims as of 2020. Texas is the fifth-largest Muslim-populated state as of 2014. The Jewish population was around 128,000 in 2008. In 2020, the Jewish population grew to over 176,000. According to ARDA's 2020 study, there were 43 Chabad synagogues; 17,513 Conservative Jews; 8,110 Orthodox Jews; and 31,378 Reform Jews. Around 146,000 adherents of religions such as Hinduism and Sikhism lived in Texas as of 2004. By 2020, there were 112,153 Hindus and 20 Sikh gurdwaras; 60,882 Texans adhered to Buddhism.

== Economy ==
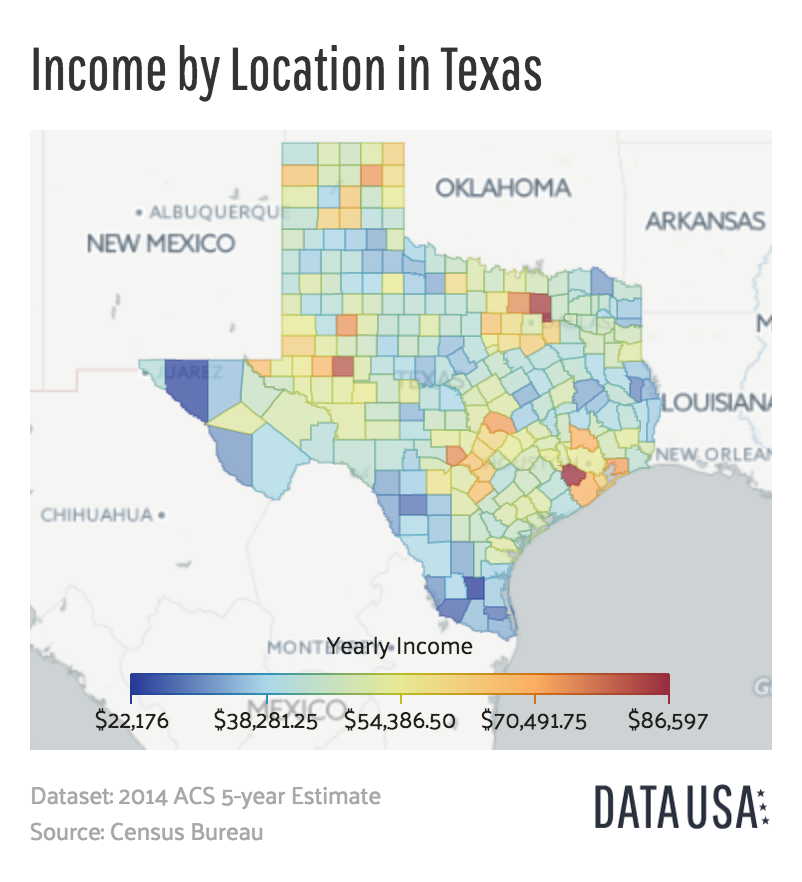
A geomap depicting income by county as of 2014

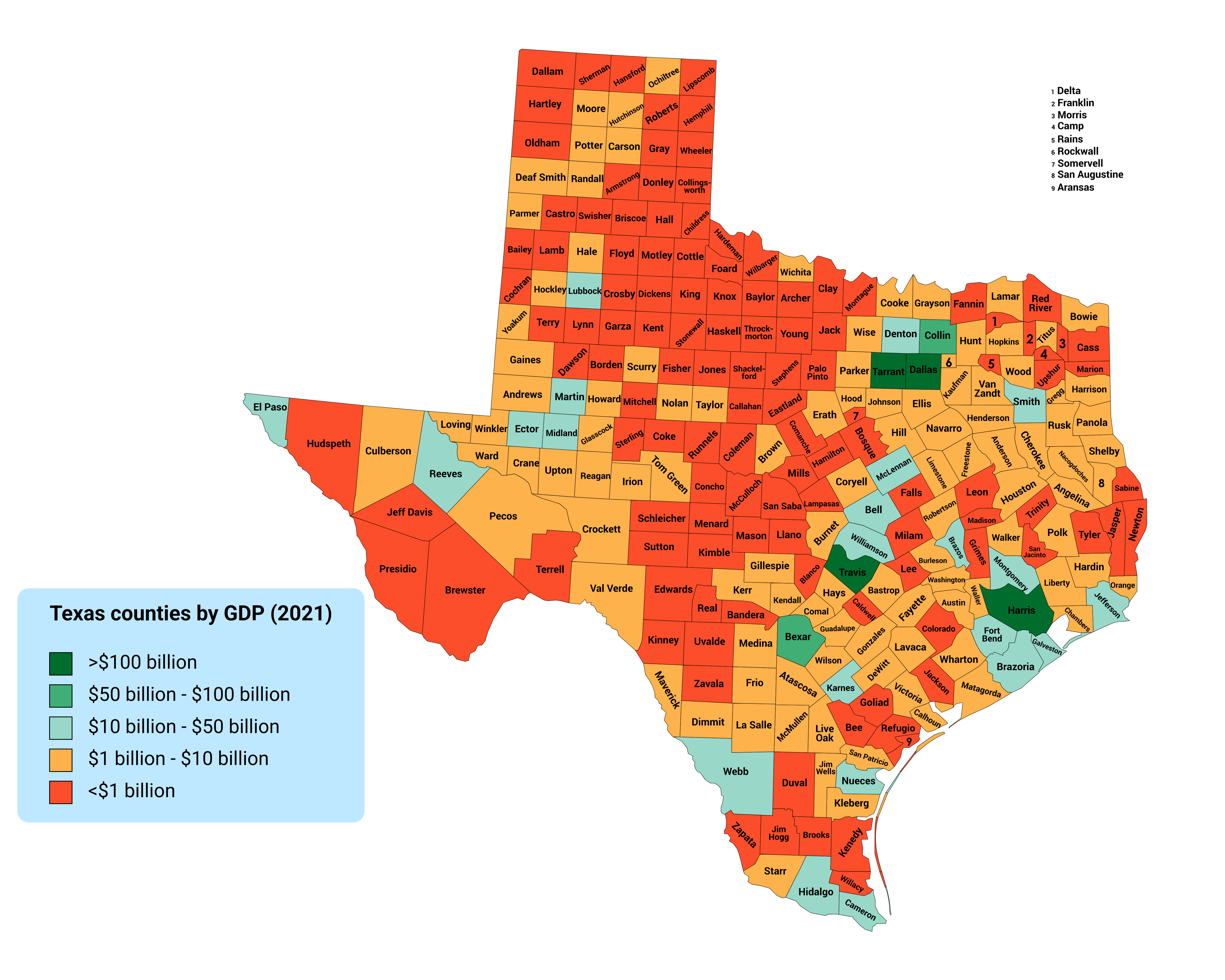
Texas counties by GDP (2021)

As of 2025, Texas had a gross state product (GSP) of $2.904 trillion, the second highest of any U.S. state. In 2025, Texas's per capita personal income was $72,364. Its GSP is greater than the GDP of Brazil, the world's 8th-largest economy. The poverty rate is 14.2%, making Texas the state with 14th highest poverty rate (compared to 13.15% nationally). Texas's economy is the second-largest of any country subdivision globally, behind California. According to Business Observer, Texas ranked third among U.S. states for business formations in 2025, with 457,373 new businesses formed within the state that year.

Texas's large population, natural resources, cities, and centers of higher education have contributed to a large and diverse economy. Since oil was discovered, the state's economy has reflected the state of the petroleum industry. In recent times, urban centers of the state have increased in size, containing two-thirds of the population in 2005. The state's economic growth has led to urban sprawl and its associated symptoms.

As of May 2025, the unemployment rate was 4.1%.

In 2010, Site Selection Magazine ranked Texas as the most business-friendly state, in part because of the state's three-billion-dollar Texas Enterprise Fund. As of 2024, it has the second-highest number (52) of Fortune 500 companies headquartered in the United States. In 2010, there were 346,000 millionaires in Texas, the second-largest population of millionaires in the nation. (Note: Second to California) In 2018, the number of millionaire households increased to 566,578.

Small businesses, or businesses that employ fewer than 500 people, make up 99.8% of businesses in Texas and employ approximately 5.1 million people, as of December 2025. The number of small businesses increased by 24% from 2017 and 2022.

=== Taxation ===
Texas has a reputation for low taxes. According to the Tax Foundation, Texans' state and local tax burdens are seventh-lowest nationally; state and local taxes cost $3,580 per capita, or 8.4 percent of resident incomes. Texas is one of seven states that lack a state income tax.

Instead, the state collects revenue from property taxes (though these are collected at the county, city, and school district level; Texas has a state constitutional prohibition against a state property tax) and sales taxes. The state sales tax rate is 6.25 percent, but local taxing jurisdictions (cities, counties, special purpose districts, and transit authorities) may also impose sales and use tax up to 2 percent for a total maximum combined rate of 8.25 percent. Gasoline tax, as of 2025, is 38.40 cents per gallon.

Texas receives more federal spending than it pays in federal taxes, receiving $1.21 for each dollar paid to the federal government. To attract business, Texas has incentive programs worth $19 billion per year (2012); more than any other U.S. state.

=== Agriculture and mining ===
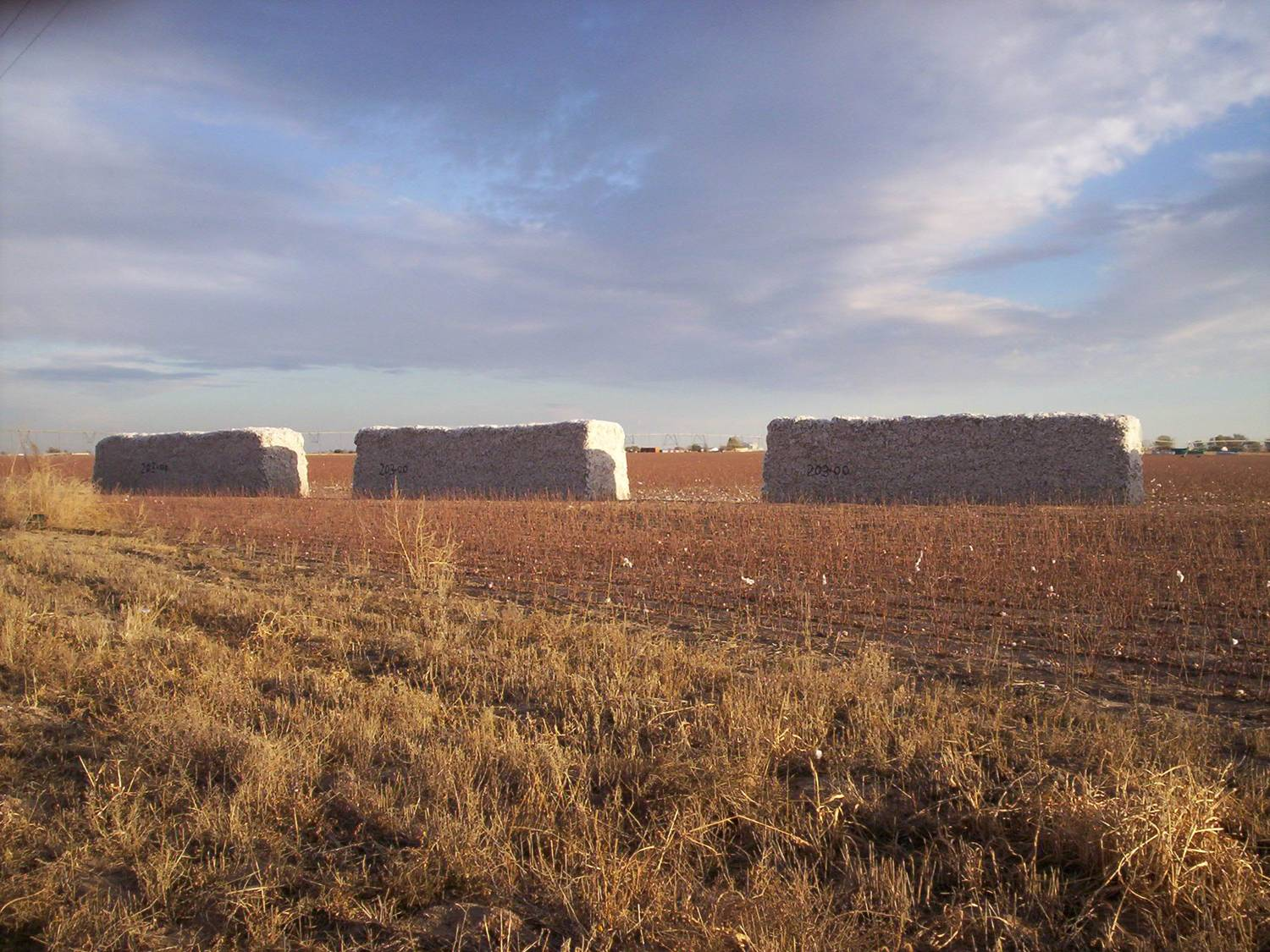
Cotton modules after harvest in West Texas

Texas longhorn cattle in Boerne, Texas

Texas has the most farms and the highest acreage in the United States. The state is ranked No. 1 for revenue generated from total livestock and livestock products. It is ranked No. 2 for total agricultural revenue, behind California. As of 2021, Texas had 126 million acres of farmland, which is the most out of all U.S. states. At $7.4 billion or 56.7 percent of Texas's annual agricultural cash receipts, beef cattle production represents the largest single segment of Texas agriculture. This is followed by cotton at $1.9 billion (14.6 percent), greenhouse/nursery at $1.5 billion (11.4 percent), broiler chickens at $1.3 billion (10 percent), and dairy products at $947 million (7.3 percent).

Texas leads the nation in the production of cattle, horses, sheep, goats, wool, mohair and hay. The state also leads the nation in production of cotton which is the number one crop grown in the state in terms of value. The state grows significant amounts of cereal crops and produce. Texas's fishing industry, along the Texas Gulf Coast, is vital to Texas's economy. In 2015, there were 80.4 million pounds of seafood landed, valued at more than $173.4 million. With mineral resources, Texas leads in creating cement, crushed stone, lime, salt, sand and gravel. Texas throughout the 21st century has been heavily impacted by drought, costing the state billions of dollars in livestock and crops. Farmland has been reduced by non-agricultural development, which includes the construction of data centers. 1.8 million acres of farmland was converted between 2017 and 2022, according to The Texas Tribune.

=== Energy ===
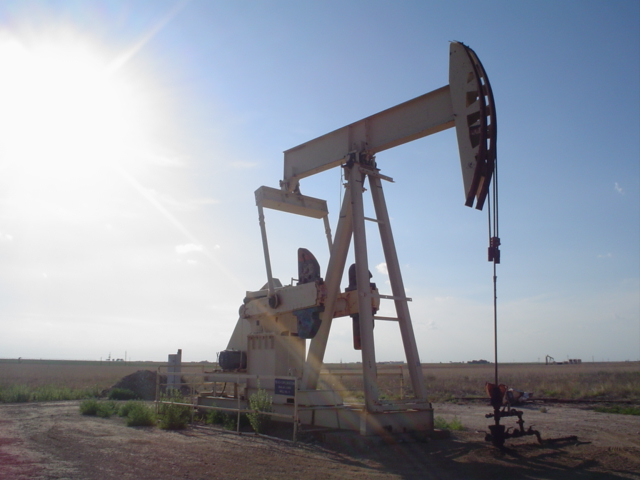
An oil well

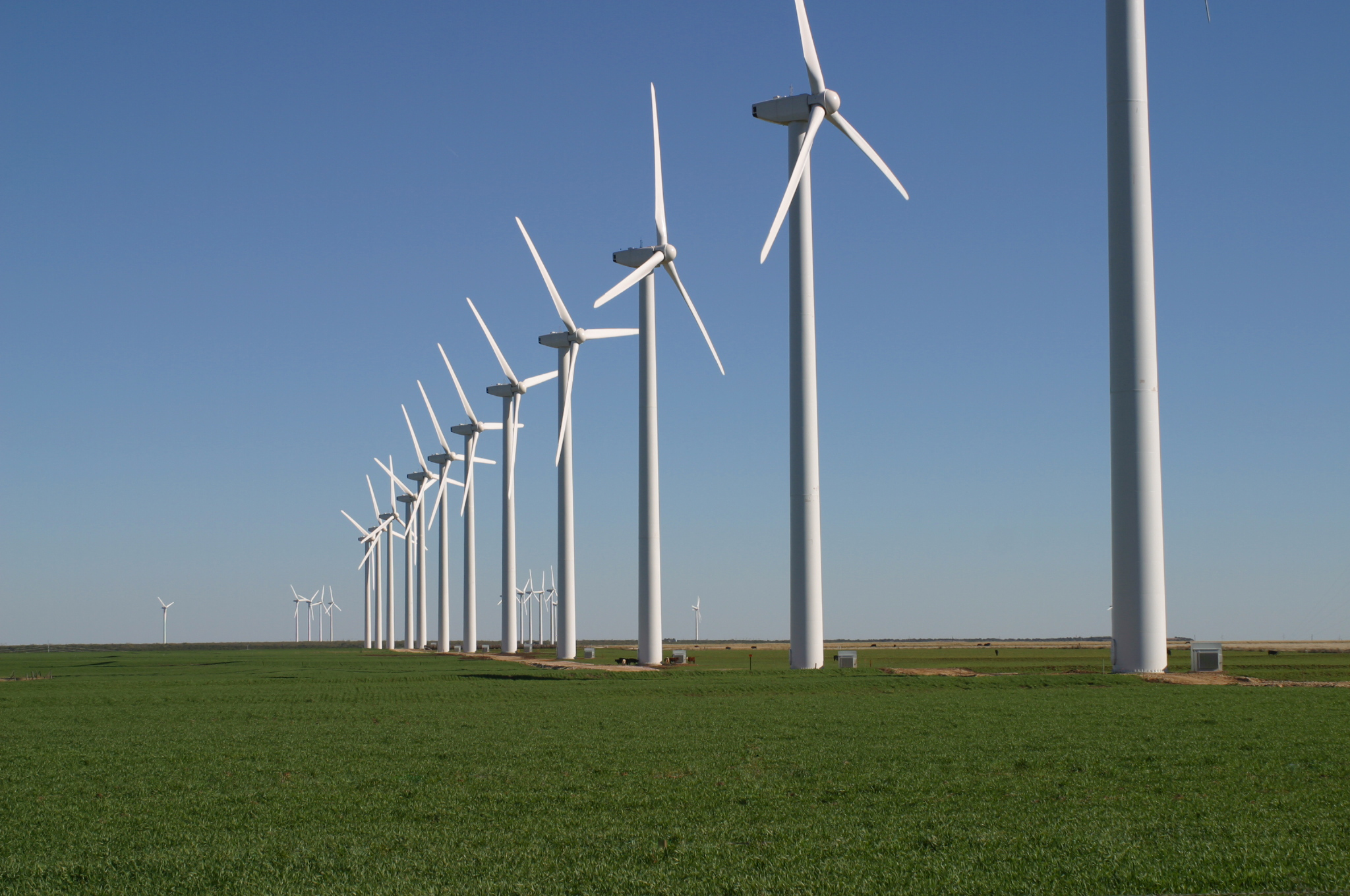
Brazos Wind Farm

Ever since the discovery of oil at Spindletop, energy has been a dominant force politically and economically within the state. If Texas were its own country it would be the sixth-largest oil producer in the world according to a 2014 study.

The Railroad Commission of Texas regulates the state's oil and gas industry, gas utilities, pipeline safety, safety in the liquefied petroleum gas industry, and surface coal and uranium mining. Until the 1970s, the commission controlled the price of petroleum because of its ability to regulate Texas's oil reserves. The founders of the Organization of Petroleum Exporting Countries (OPEC) used the Texas agency as one of their models for petroleum price control.

As of January 1, 2021, Texas has proved recoverable petroleum reserves of about 15.6 billion barrels (2.48×10^{9} m^{3}) of crude oil (44% of the known U.S. reserves) and 9.5 billion barrels (1.51×10^{9} m^{3}) of natural gas liquids. The state's refineries can process 5.95 million barrels (946,000 m^{3}) of oil a day. The Port Arthur Refinery in Southeast Texas is the largest refinery in the U.S. Texas is also a leader in natural gas production at 28.8 billion cubic feet (820,000,000 m^{3}) per day, some 32% of the nation's production. Texas has 102.4 trillion cubic feet (2.90×10^{12} m^{3}) of gas reserves which is 23% of the nation's gas reserves. Many petroleum companies are based in Texas such as: ConocoPhillips, EOG Resources, ExxonMobil, Halliburton, Hilcorp, Marathon Oil, Occidental Petroleum, Valero Energy, and Western Refining.

As of 2023, Texans consume, on average, the sixth most energy (of all types) in the nation per capita, following Alaska, Louisiana, North Dakota, Wyoming and West Virginia.

Unlike the rest of the nation, most of Texas is on its own alternating current power grid, the Texas Interconnection. Texas has a deregulated electric service. Texas leads the nation in total net electricity production, generating 437,236 MWh in 2014, 89% more MWh than Florida, which ranked second.

The state is a leader in renewable energy commercialization; it produces the most wind power in the nation. In 2014, 10.6% of the electricity consumed in Texas came from wind turbines. The Roscoe Wind Farm in Roscoe, Texas, is one of the world's largest wind farms with a 781.5 megawatt (MW) capacity. The Energy Information Administration states the state's large agriculture and forestry industries could give Texas an enormous amount of biomass for use in biofuels. The state also has the highest solar power potential for development in the U.S.

=== Technology ===
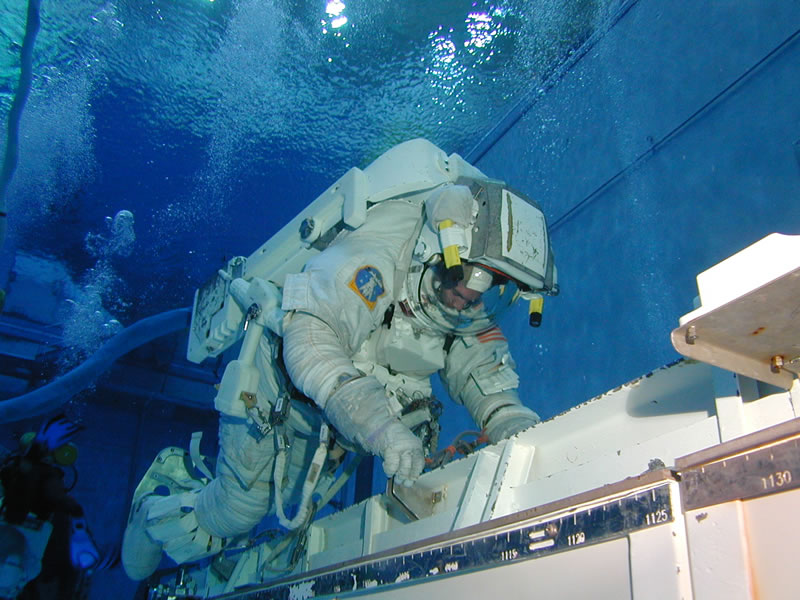
Astronaut training at the Johnson Space Center in Houston

With large universities systems coupled with initiatives like the Texas Enterprise Fund and the Texas Emerging Technology Fund, a wide array of different high tech industries have developed in Texas. The Austin area is nicknamed the "Silicon Hills" and the north Dallas area the "Silicon Prairie". Many high-tech companies are located in or have their headquarters in Texas (and Austin in particular), including Dell, Inc., Borland, Forcepoint, Indeed.com, Texas Instruments, Perot Systems, Rackspace and AT&T.

The National Aeronautics and Space Administration's Lyndon B. Johnson Space Center (NASA JSC) is located in Southeast Houston. Both SpaceX and Blue Origin have their test facilities in Texas. Fort Worth hosts both Lockheed Martin's Aeronautics division and Bell Helicopter Textron. Lockheed builds the F-16 Fighting Falcon, the largest Western fighter program, and its successor, the F-35 Lightning II in Fort Worth.

=== Commerce ===
Texas has strong commercial sector consisting of retail, wholesale, banking and insurance, and construction sectors. Texas further has a diverse economy, with multiple Fortune 500 companies not based on Texas traditional industries such as AT&T, Kimberly-Clark, J. C. Penney, Whole Foods Market, and Tenet Healthcare. Nationally, the Dallas–Fort Worth area, home to the second shopping mall in the United States, has the most shopping malls per capita of any American metropolitan statistical area.

Mexico, the state's largest trading partner, imports a third of the state's exports because of the North American Free Trade Agreement (NAFTA). NAFTA has encouraged the formation of maquiladoras on the Texas–Mexico border.

=== Transportation ===
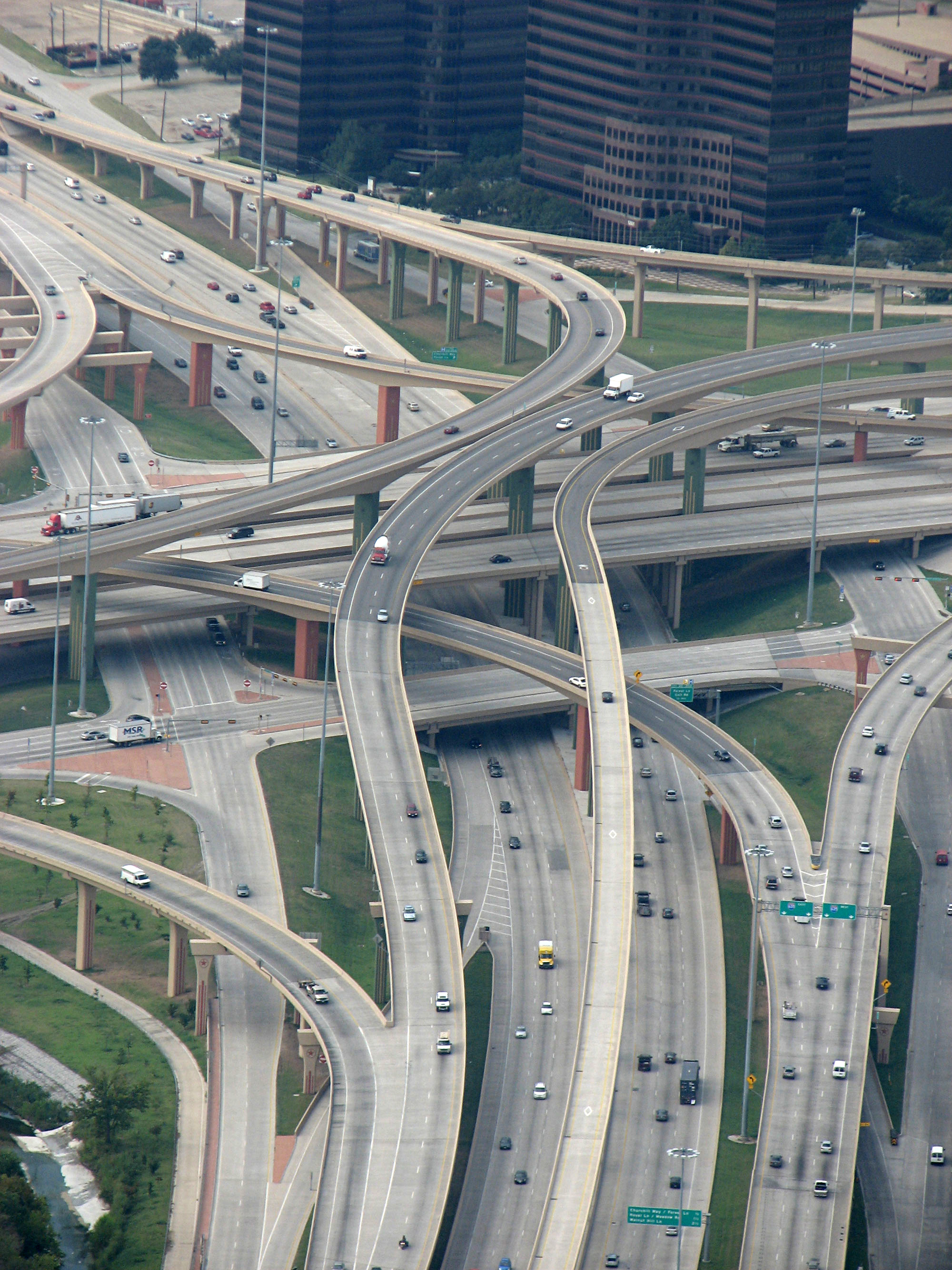
The High Five Interchange in Dallas

Although the state's large size and rough terrain have historically complicated transportation, Texas has compensated by building the nation's largest highway and railway systems. The regulatory authority, the Texas Department of Transportation (TxDOT), maintains the state's highway system, and regulates aviation and public transportation systems.

Texas is an important transportation hub in America - from the Dallas/Fort Worth area, trucks can reach 93 percent of the nation's population within 48 hours, and 37 percent within 24 hours. Texas has 33 foreign trade zones (FTZ), the most in the nation. In 2004, a combined total of $298 billion of goods passed through Texas FTZs.

==== Highways ====
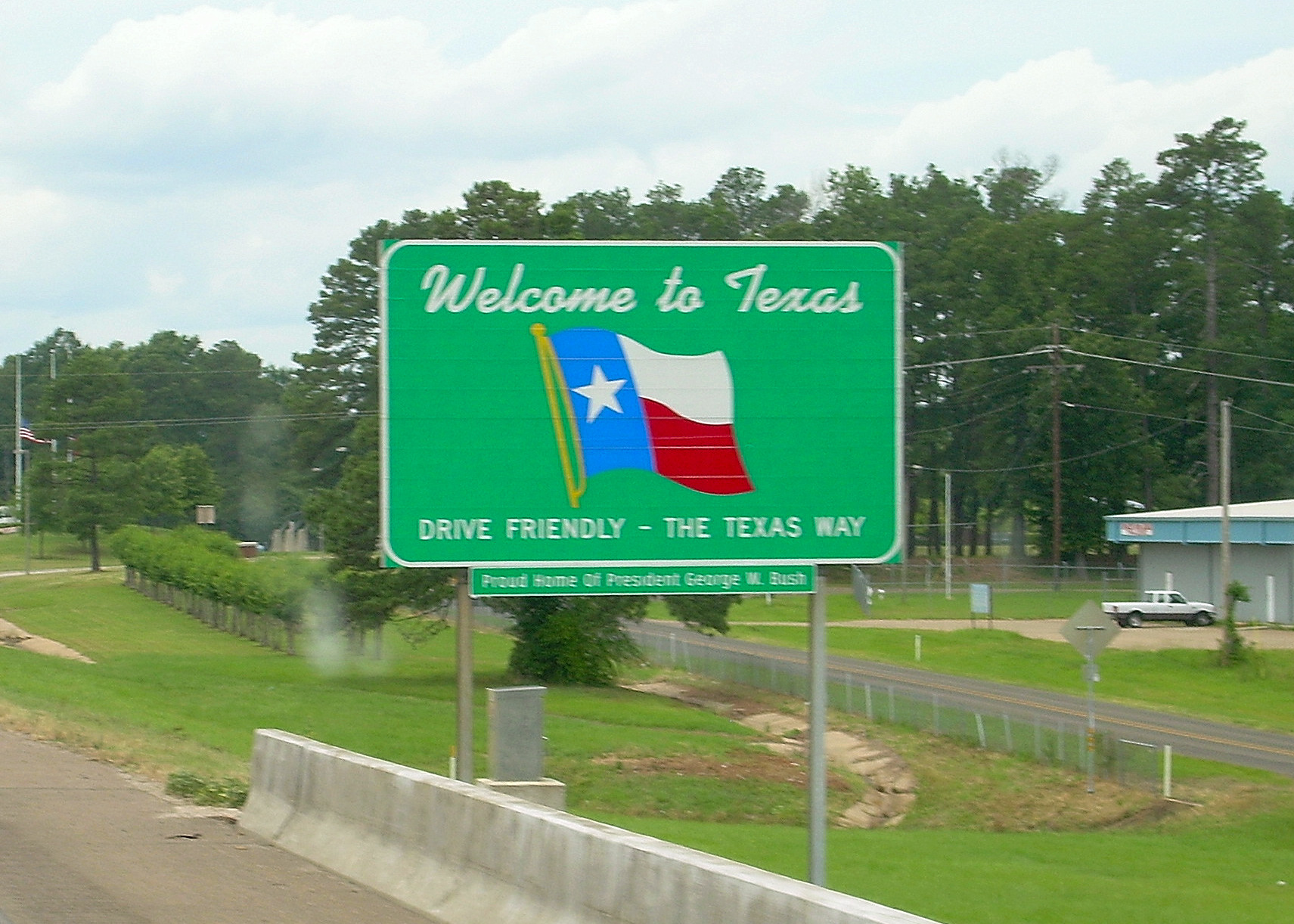
"Welcome to Texas" sign, entering the state from Arkansas on Interstate 30

The first Texas freeway was the Gulf Freeway opened in 1948 in Houston. As of 2005, 79,535 miles (127,999 km) of public highway crisscrossed Texas (up from 71,000 miles or 114,000 km in 1984). To fund recent growth in the state highways, Texas has 17 toll roads with several additional tollways proposed. In Central Texas, the southern section of the State Highway 130 toll road has a speed limit of 85 miles per hour (137 km/h), the highest in the nation. All federal and state highways in Texas are paved.

==== Airports ====
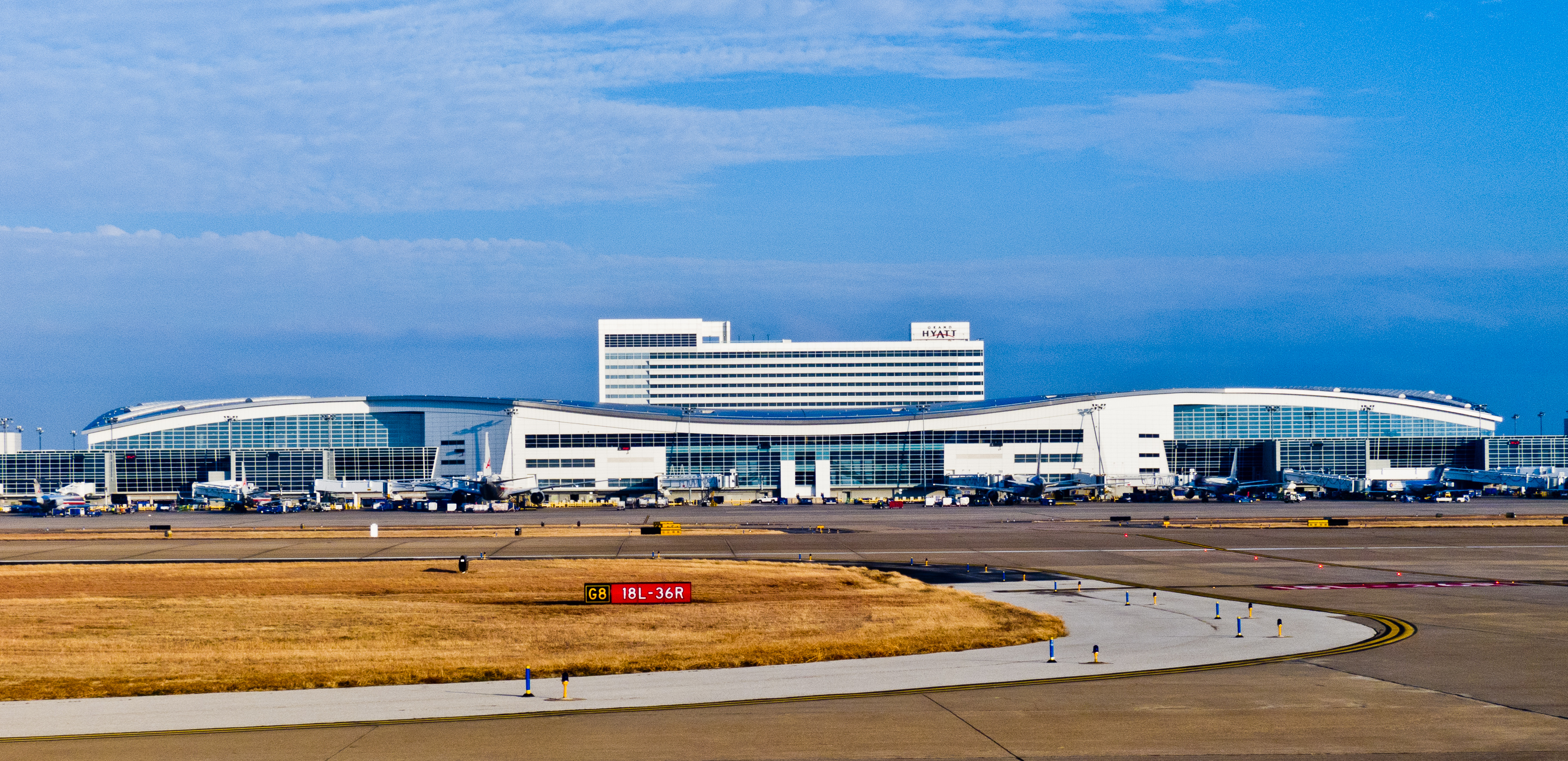
Terminal D at Dallas/Fort Worth International Airport

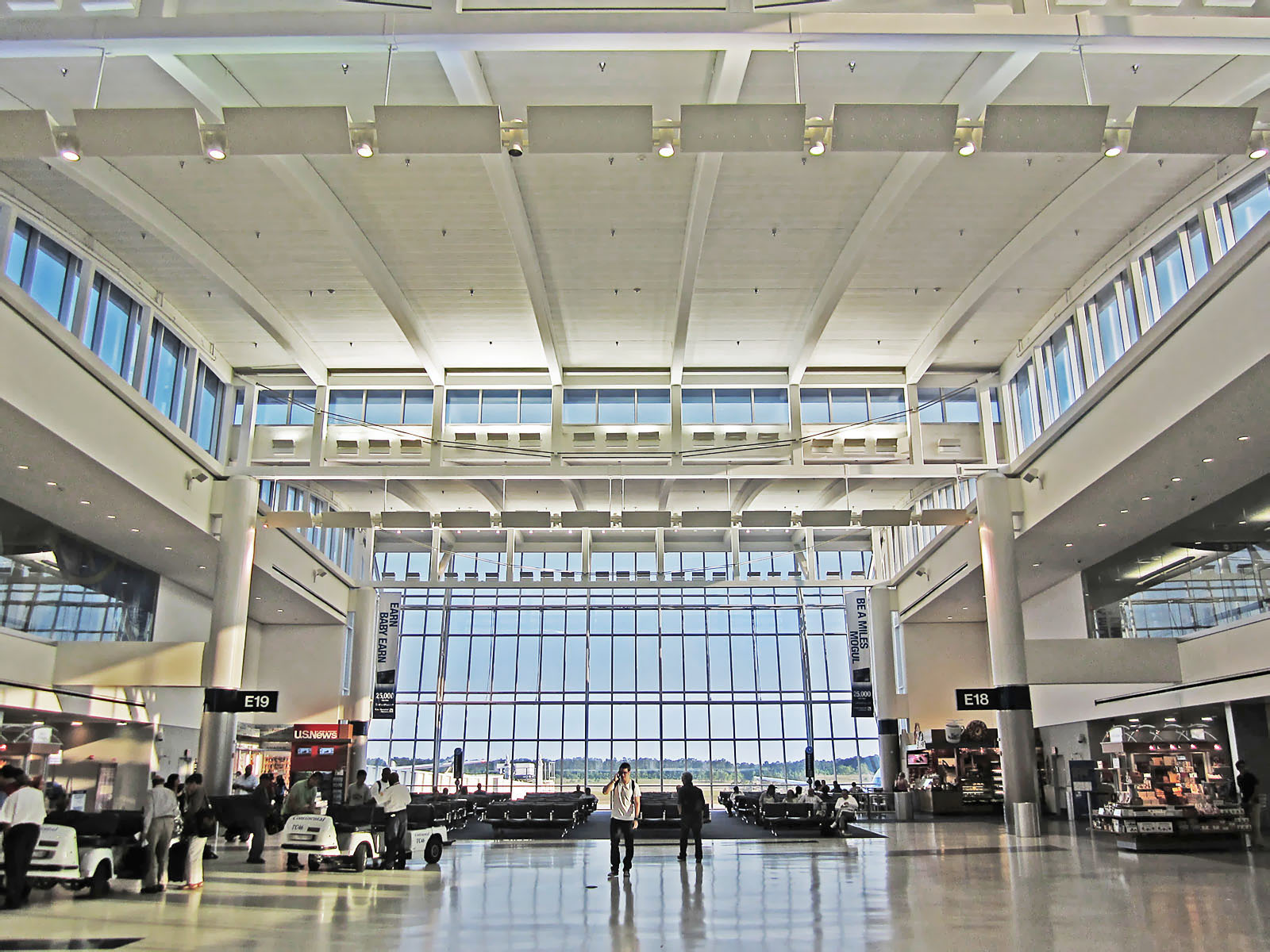
Terminal E at George Bush Intercontinental Airport in Houston

Texas has 730 airports, second-most of any state in the nation. Largest in Texas by size and passengers served, Dallas/Fort Worth International Airport (DFW) is the second-largest by area in the United States, and fourth in the world with 18,076 acres (73.15 km^{2}). In traffic, DFW airport is the busiest in the state, the fourth busiest in the United States, and sixth worldwide. Southwest Airlines, headquartered in Dallas, has its operations at Dallas Love Field. American Airlines Group's American / American Eagle, the world's largest airline in total passengers-miles transported and passenger fleet size, uses DFW as its largest and main hub.

Texas's second-largest air facility is Houston's George Bush Intercontinental Airport (IAH). It serves as the largest hub for United Airlines, the world's third-largest airline, by passenger-miles flown. (Note: Based on the industry-standard measure of revenue passenger-kilometers/miles flown) IAH offers service to the most Mexican destinations of any U.S. airport. The next five largest airports in the state all serve more than three million passengers annually; they include Austin-Bergstrom International Airport, William P. Hobby Airport, San Antonio International Airport, Dallas Love Field and El Paso International Airport. The smallest airport in the state to be designated an international airport is Del Rio International Airport.

==== Ports ====
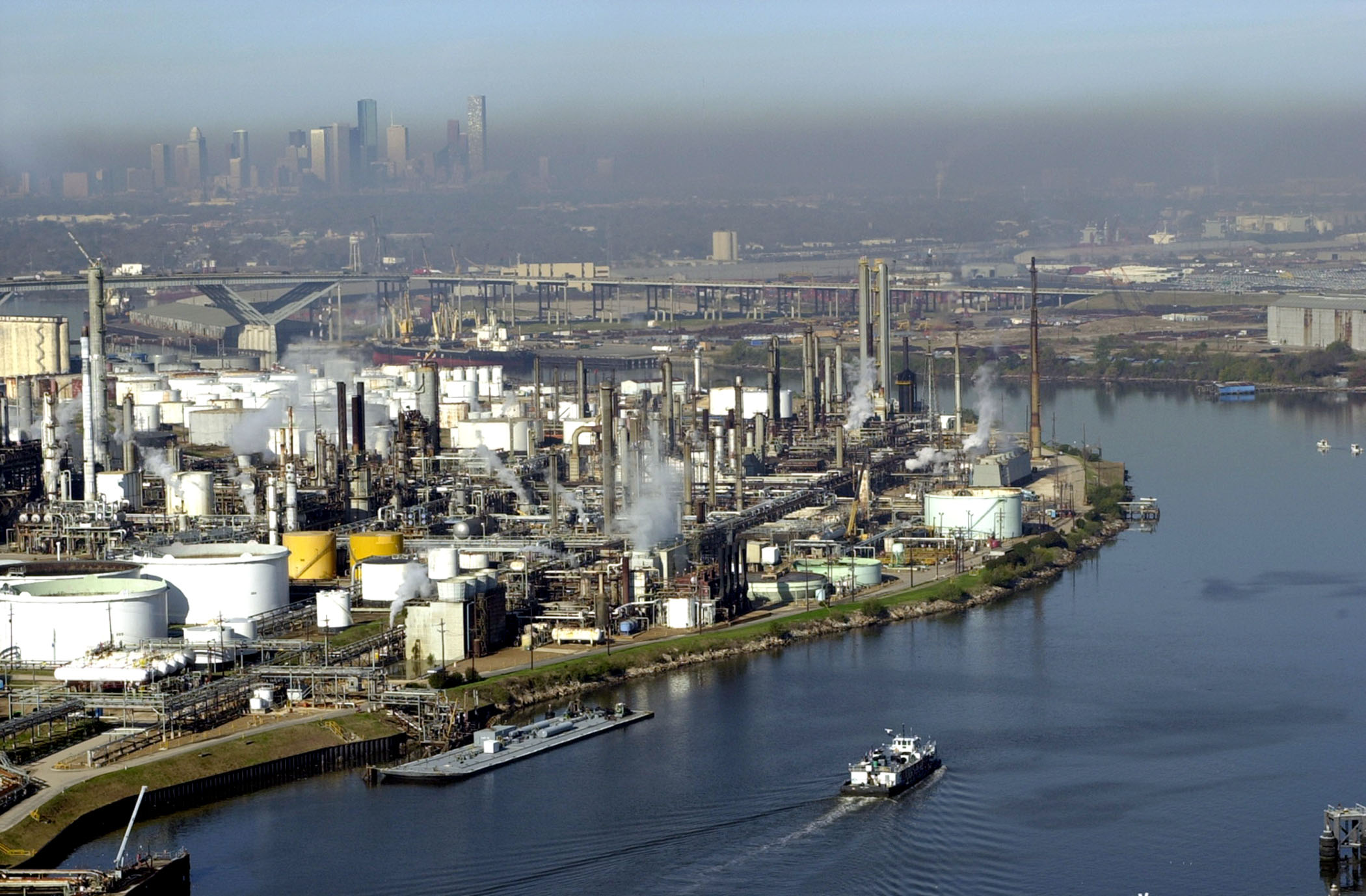
Port of Houston along the Houston Ship Channel

Around 1,150 seaports dot Texas's coast with over 1,000 miles (1,600 km) of channels. Ports employ nearly one-million people and handle an average of 317 million metric tons. Texas ports connect with the rest of the U.S. Atlantic seaboard with the Gulf section of the Intracoastal Waterway. The Port of Houston today is the busiest port in the United States in foreign tonnage, second in overall tonnage, and tenth worldwide in tonnage. The Houston Ship Channel spans 530 feet (160 m) wide by 45 feet (14 m) deep by 50 miles (80 km) long.

==== Railroads ====
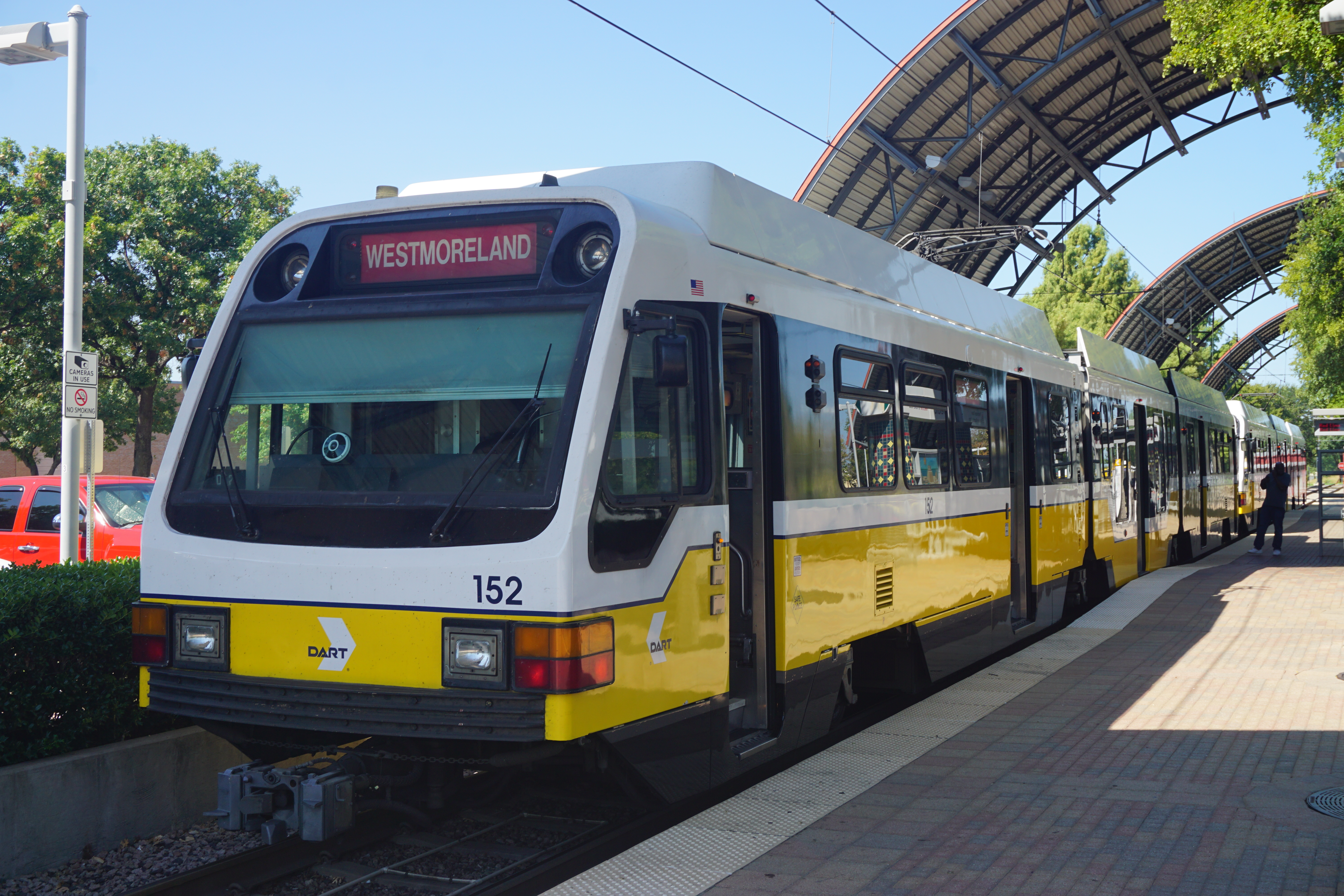
DART rail in Dallas

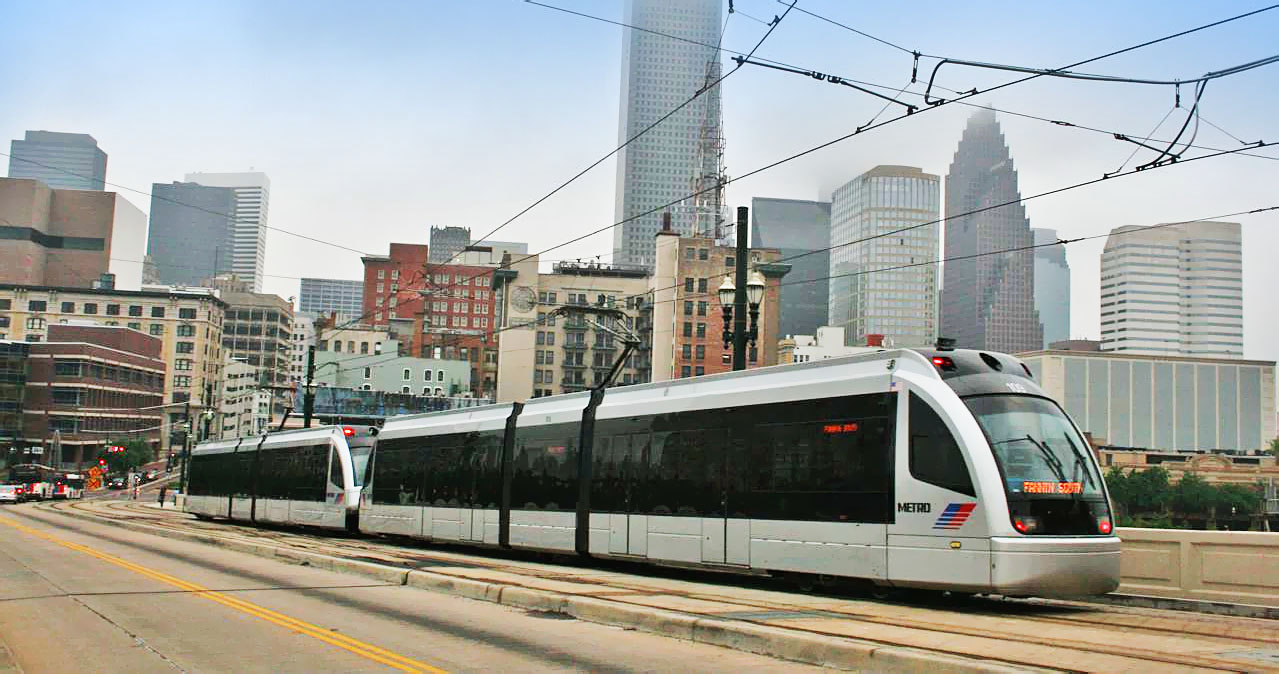
METRORail in Houston

Part of the state's tradition of cowboys is derived from the massive cattle drives which its ranchers organized in the nineteenth century to drive livestock to railroads and markets.

The first railroad to operate in Texas was the Buffalo Bayou, Brazos and Colorado Railway, opening in August 1853. The first railroad to enter Texas from the north, completed in 1872, was the Missouri–Kansas–Texas Railroad. With increasing railroad access, the ranchers did not have to take their livestock up to the Midwest and shipped beef out from Texas. This caused a decline in the economies of the cow towns.

Since 1911, Texas has led the nation in length of railroad miles within the state. Texas railway length peaked in 1932 at 17,078 miles (27,484 km), but declined to 14,006 miles (22,540 km) by 2000. While the Railroad Commission of Texas originally regulated state railroads, in 2005 the state reassigned these duties to TxDOT.

In the Dallas–Fort Worth area, three public transit agencies provide rail service: Dallas Area Rapid Transit (DART), Denton County Transportation Authority (DCTA), and Trinity Metro. DART began operating the first light rail system in the Southwest United States in 1996. The Trinity Railway Express (TRE) commuter rail service, which connects Fort Worth and Dallas, is provided by Trinity Metro and DART. Trinity Metro also operates the TEXRail commuter rail line, connecting downtown Fort Worth and Northeast Tarrant County to DFW Airport. The A-train commuter rail line, operated by DCTA, acts as an extension of the DART Green line into Denton County. In the Austin area, Capital Metropolitan Transportation Authority operates a commuter rail service known as Capital MetroRail to the northwestern suburbs. The Metropolitan Transit Authority of Harris County, Texas (METRO) operates light rail lines called METRORail in the Houston area.

Amtrak provides Texas with limited intercity passenger rail service. Three scheduled routes serve the state: the daily Texas Eagle (Chicago–San Antonio); the tri-weekly Sunset Limited (New Orleans–Los Angeles), with stops in Texas; and the daily Heartland Flyer (Fort Worth–Oklahoma City). Texas may get one of the nation's first high-speed rail line. Plans for a privately funded high-speed rail line between Dallas and Houston have been planned by the Texas Central Railway company.

== Culture ==
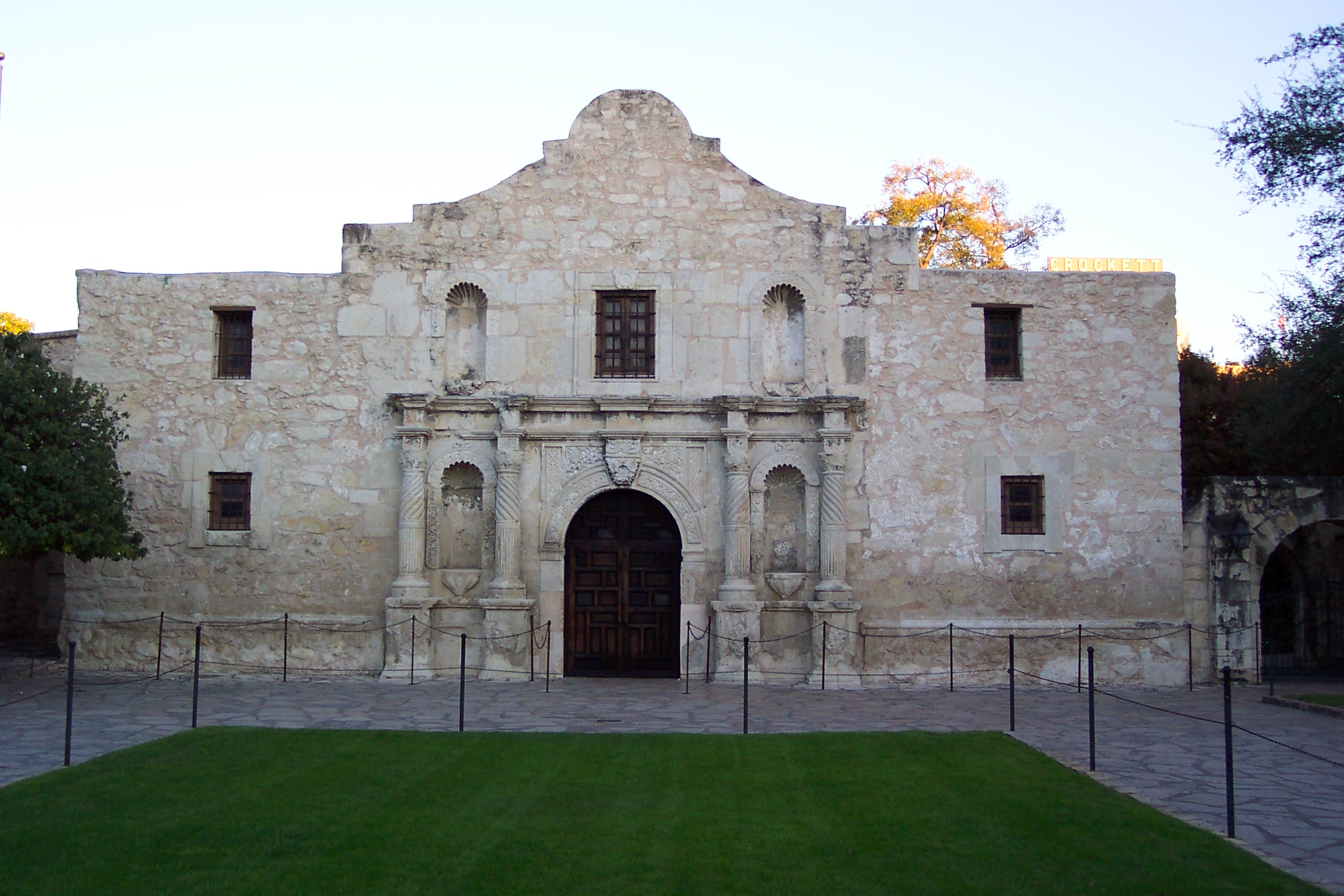
The Alamo is one of the most recognized symbols of Texas.

Historically, Texas culture comes from a blend of mostly Southern (Dixie), Western (frontier), and Southwestern (Mexican/Anglo fusion) influences, varying in degrees of such from one intrastate region to another. A popular food item, the breakfast burrito, draws from all three, having a soft flour tortilla wrapped around bacon and scrambled eggs or other hot, cooked fillings. Adding to Texas's traditional culture, established in the 18th and 19th centuries, immigration has made Texas a melting pot of cultures from around the world.

Texas has made a strong mark on national and international pop culture. The entire state is strongly associated with the image of the cowboy shown in westerns and in country western music. The state's numerous oil tycoons are also a popular pop culture topic as seen in the hit TV series Dallas.

The internationally known slogan "Don't Mess with Texas" began as an anti-littering advertisement. Since the campaign's inception in 1986, the phrase has become "an identity statement, a declaration of Texas swagger".

=== Texas self-perception ===
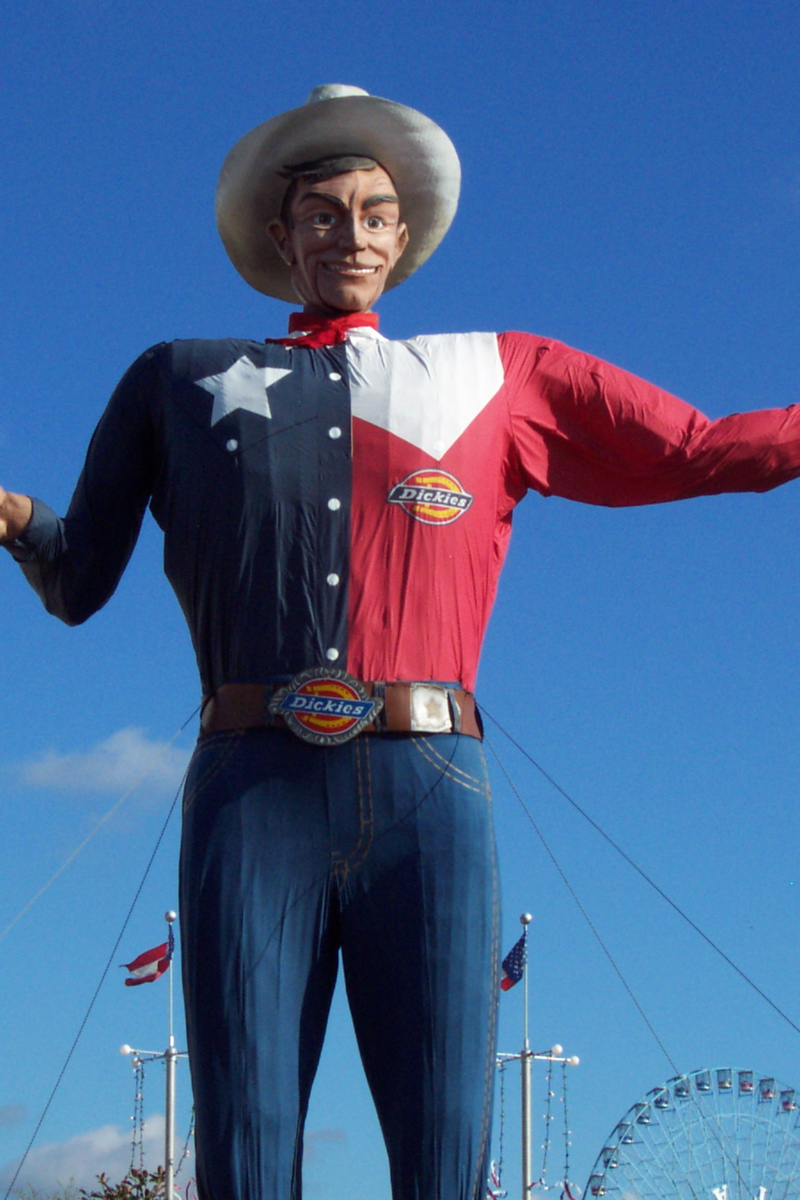
Big Tex presided over every Texas State Fair since 1952 until it was destroyed by a fire in 2012. Since then a new Big Tex was created.

"Texas-sized" describes something that is about the size of Texas, or something (usually but not always originating from Texas) that is large compared to other objects of its type. Texas was the largest U.S. state until Alaska became a state in 1959. The phrase "everything is bigger in Texas" has been in regular use since at least 1950.

=== Arts ===
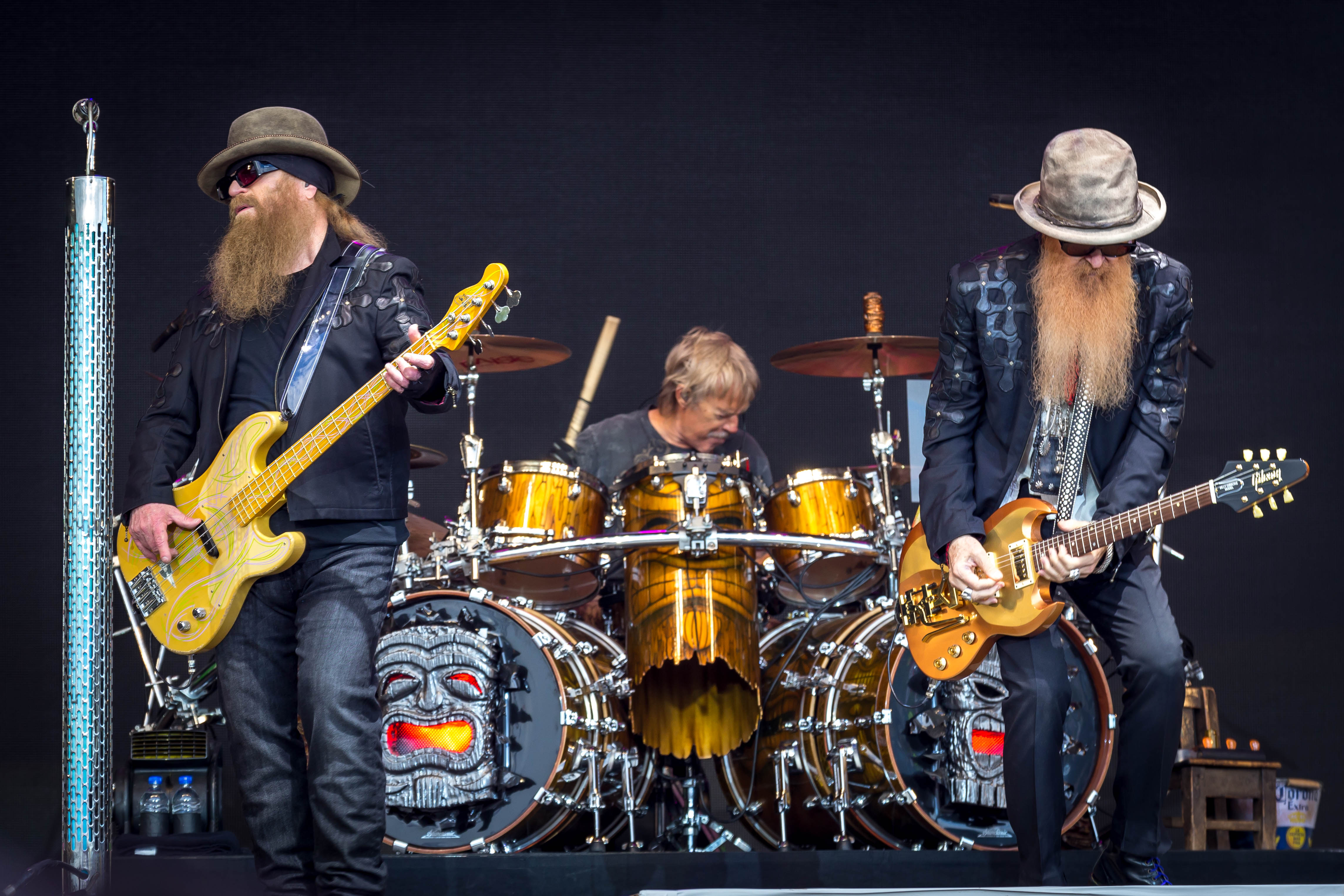
ZZ Top performing in 2016. The power trio are considered cultural icons of Texas and blues-inspired rock music.

Houston is one of only five American cities with permanent professional resident companies in all the major performing arts disciplines: the Houston Grand Opera, the Houston Symphony Orchestra, the Houston Ballet, and The Alley Theatre. Known for the vibrancy of its visual and performing arts, the Houston Theater District ranks second in the country in the number of theater seats in a concentrated downtown area, with 12,948 seats for live performances and 1,480 movie seats. Founded in 1892, Modern Art Museum of Fort Worth, also called "The Modern", is Texas's oldest art museum. Fort Worth also has the Kimbell Art Museum, the Amon Carter Museum, the National Cowgirl Museum and Hall of Fame, the Will Rogers Memorial Center, and the Bass Performance Hall downtown. The Arts District of Downtown Dallas has arts venues such as the Dallas Museum of Art, the Morton H. Meyerson Symphony Center, the Margot and Bill Winspear Opera House, the Trammell & Margaret Crow Collection of Asian Art, and the Nasher Sculpture Center.

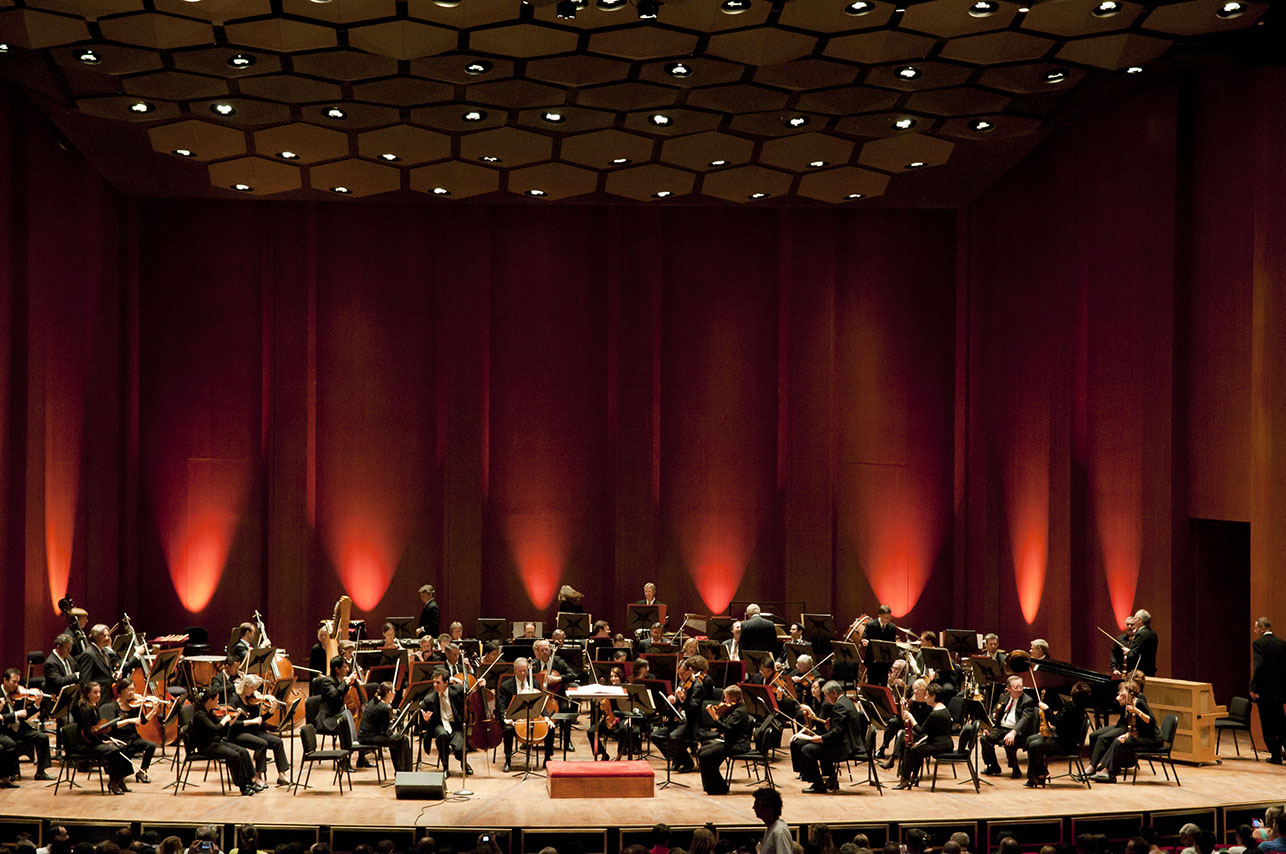
Houston Symphony at the Jones Hall

The Deep Ellum district within Dallas became popular during the 1920s and 1930s as the prime jazz and blues hotspot in the Southern United States. The name Deep Ellum comes from local people pronouncing "Deep Elm" as "Deep Ellum". Artists such as Blind Lemon Jefferson, Robert Johnson, Huddie "Lead Belly" Ledbetter, and Bessie Smith played in early Deep Ellum clubs.

Austin, The Live Music Capital of the World, boasts "more live music venues per capita than such music hotbeds as Nashville, Memphis, Los Angeles, Las Vegas or New York City". The city's music revolves around the nightclubs on 6th Street; events like the film, music, and multimedia festival South by Southwest; the longest-running concert music program on American television, Austin City Limits; and the Austin City Limits Music Festival held in Zilker Park.

Since 1980, San Antonio has evolved into "The Tejano Music Capital Of The World". The Tejano Music Awards have provided a forum to create greater awareness and appreciation for Tejano music and culture.

=== Sports ===
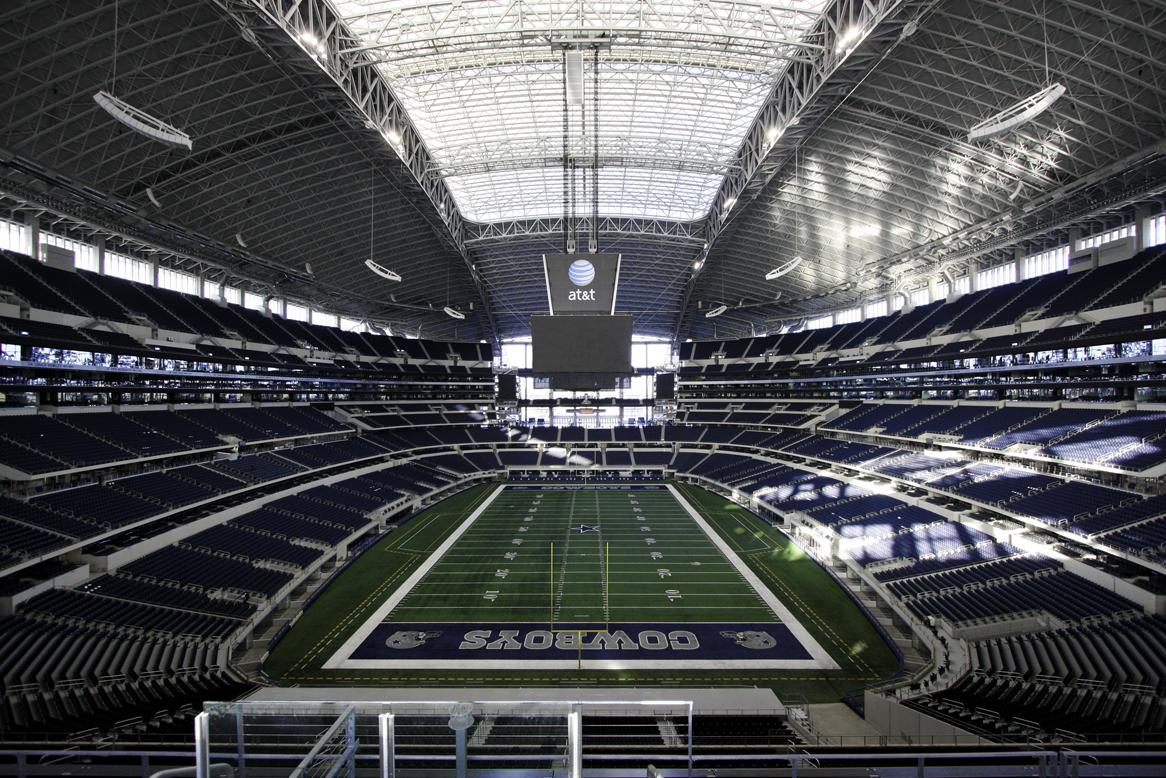
AT&T Stadium, home of the Dallas Cowboys, who are commonly known as America's Team

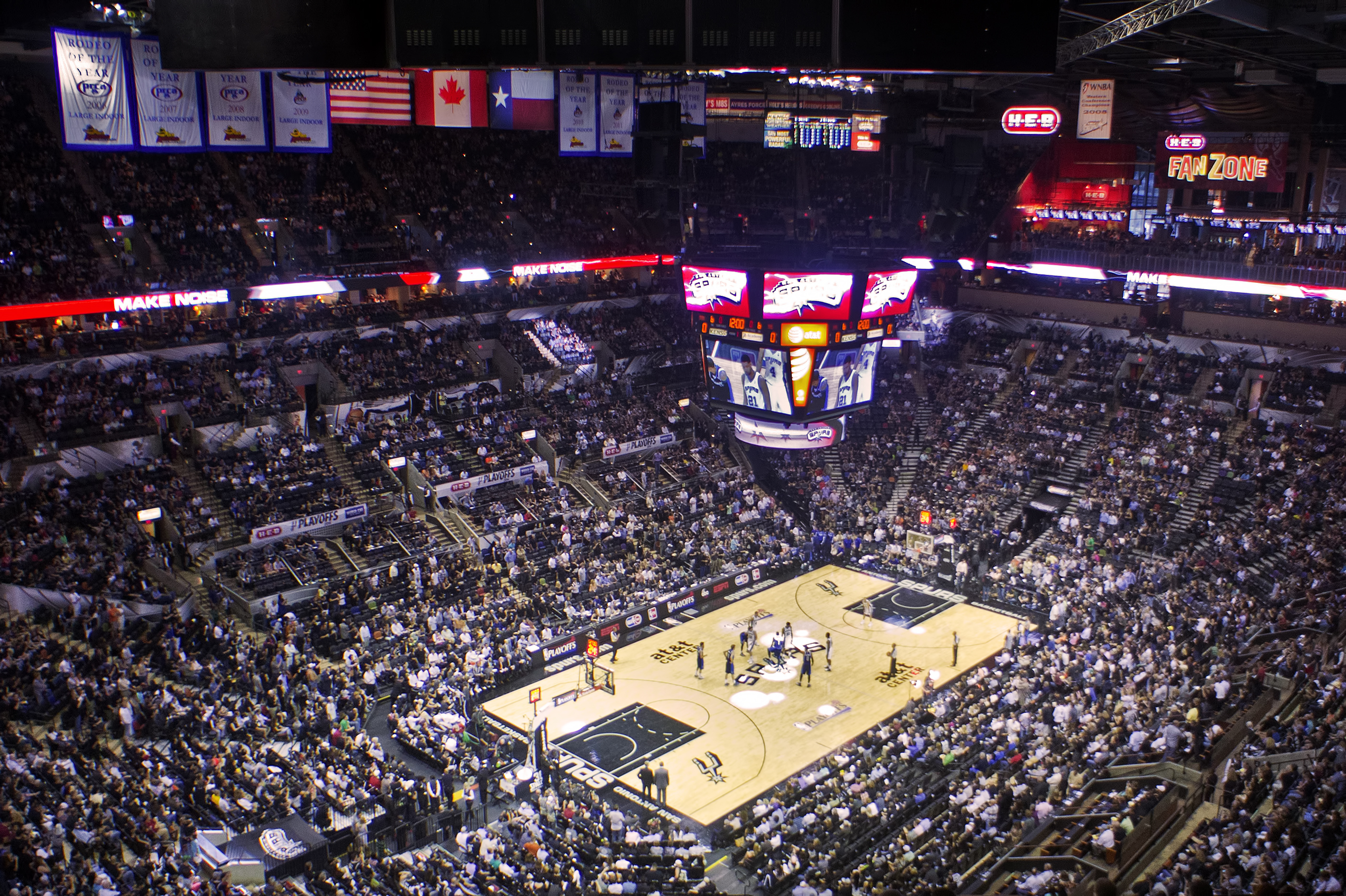
Playoff game between the San Antonio Spurs and the Dallas Mavericks in 2014; the Spurs won the NBA Finals that year.

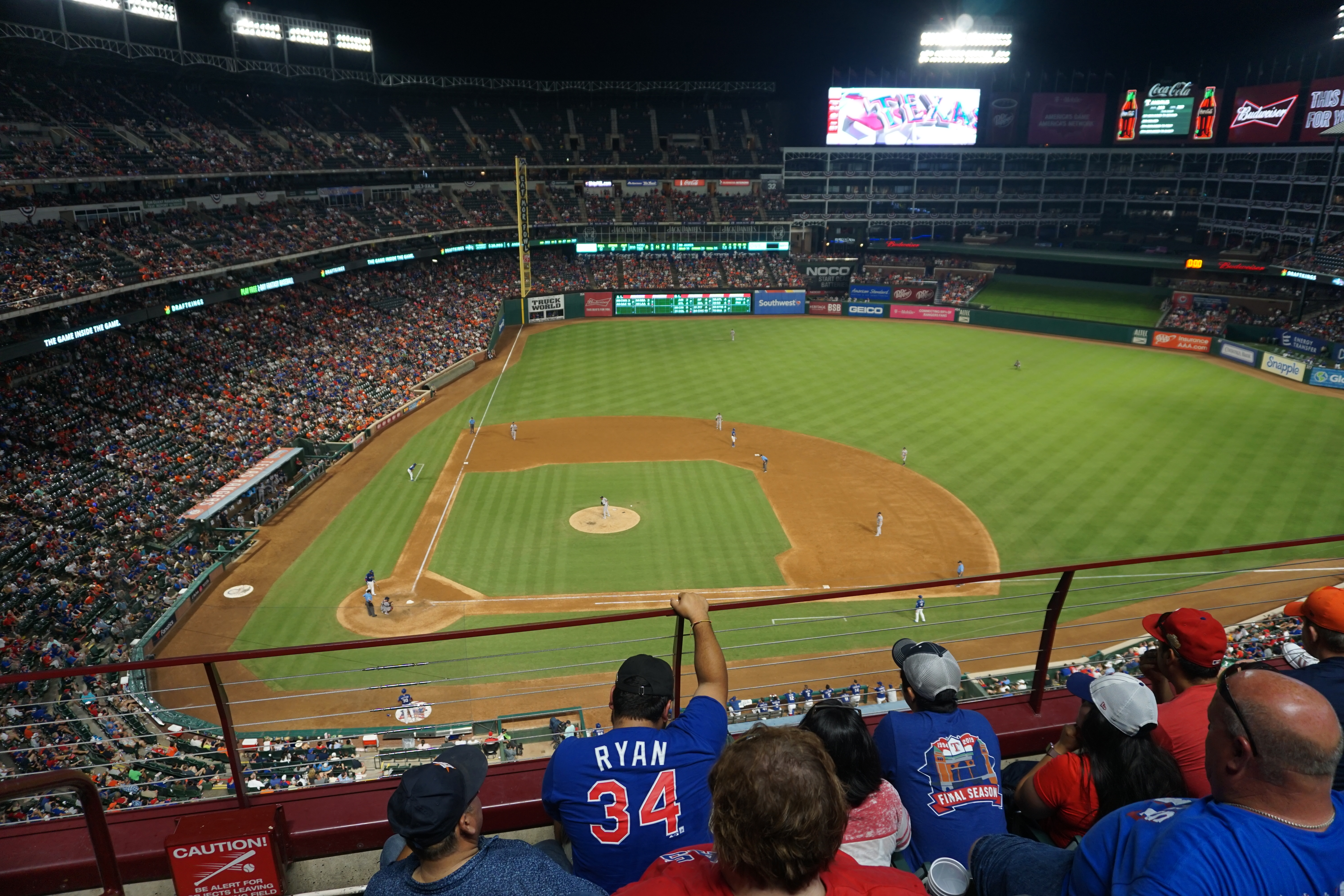
Texan baseball fans attending a game between the state's two MLB teams (Texas Rangers and Houston Astros) at Globe Life Field in Arlington

Within the "Big Four" professional leagues, Texas has two NFL teams (the Dallas Cowboys and the Houston Texans), two MLB teams (the Houston Astros and the Texas Rangers), three NBA teams (the San Antonio Spurs, the Houston Rockets, and the Dallas Mavericks), and one NHL team (the Dallas Stars). The Dallas–Fort Worth metroplex is one of only twelve American metropolitan areas that host sports teams from all the "Big Four" professional leagues. Outside of the "Big Four", Texas also has a WNBA team (the Dallas Wings), three Major League Soccer teams (Austin FC, Houston Dynamo FC and FC Dallas), and one NWSL team (the Houston Dash).

Collegiate athletics have deep significance in Texas culture, especially football. The state has twelve Division I-FBS schools, the most in the nation. Four of the state's schools claim at least one national championship in football: the Texas Longhorns, the Texas A&M Aggies, the TCU Horned Frogs, and the SMU Mustangs. According to a survey of Division I-A coaches, the rivalry between the University of Oklahoma and the University of Texas at Austin, the Red River Shootout, ranks the third-best in the nation. The TCU Horned Frogs and SMU Mustangs also share a rivalry and compete annually in the Battle for the Iron Skillet. A fierce rivalry, the Lone Star Showdown, also exists between the state's two largest universities, Texas A&M University and the University of Texas at Austin. The athletics portion of the Lone Star Showdown rivalry was paused between 2012, when Texas A&M left the Big 12 and joined the SEC, and 2024, when Texas joined them.

The University Interscholastic League (UIL) organizes most primary and secondary school competitions. Events organized by UIL include contests in athletics (the most popular being high school football) as well as artistic and academic subjects.

Rodeo (the state sport) in Austin

Texans also enjoy rodeo. The world's first rodeo was hosted in Pecos, Texas. The annual Houston Livestock Show and Rodeo is the largest rodeo in the world. The Southwestern Exposition and Livestock Show in Fort Worth is the oldest continuously running rodeo incorporating many of the state's most historic traditions into its annual events. Dallas hosts the State Fair of Texas each year at Fair Park.

Texas Motor Speedway hosts annual NASCAR Cup Series and IndyCar Series auto races since 1997. Since 2012, Austin's Circuit of the Americas plays host to a round of the Formula 1 World Championship.

The Panther City Lacrosse Club is a professional lacrosse team in the National Lacrosse League. They have played local matches at Dickies Arena in Fort Worth, Texas since their inaugural 2021–2022 season.

== Education ==
The second president of the Republic of Texas, Mirabeau B. Lamar, is known as the Father of Texas Education. During his term, the state set aside three leagues in each county for public schools. An additional 50 leagues of land set aside for the support of two universities would later become the basis of the state's Permanent University Fund. Lamar's actions set the foundation for a Texas-wide public school system.

Texas has over 1,000 school districts, all administered by the Texas Education Agency, and all districts except the Stafford Municipal School District are independent from municipal government and many cross city boundaries. School districts have the power to tax their residents and to assert eminent domain over privately owned property. Due to court-mandated equitable school financing, the state has a tax redistribution system called the "Robin Hood plan" which transfers property tax revenue from wealthy school districts to poor ones. The TEA has no authority over private or homeschooling activities.

Students in Texas take the State of Texas Assessments of Academic Readiness (STAAR) in primary and secondary school. STAAR assess students' attainment of reading, writing, mathematics, science, and social studies skills required under Texas education standards and the No Child Left Behind Act. The test replaced the Texas Assessment of Knowledge and Skills (TAKS) test in the 2011–2012 school year.

Generally prohibited in the Western world, school corporal punishment is not unusual in the more conservative, rural areas of the state, with 28,569 public school students paddled at least one time, (Note: This figure refers to only the number of students paddled, regardless of whether a student was spanked multiple times in a year, and does not refer to the number of instances of corporal punishment, which would be substantially higher.) according to government data for the 2011–2012 school year. The rate of school corporal punishment in Texas is surpassed only by Mississippi, Alabama, and Arkansas.

=== Higher education ===
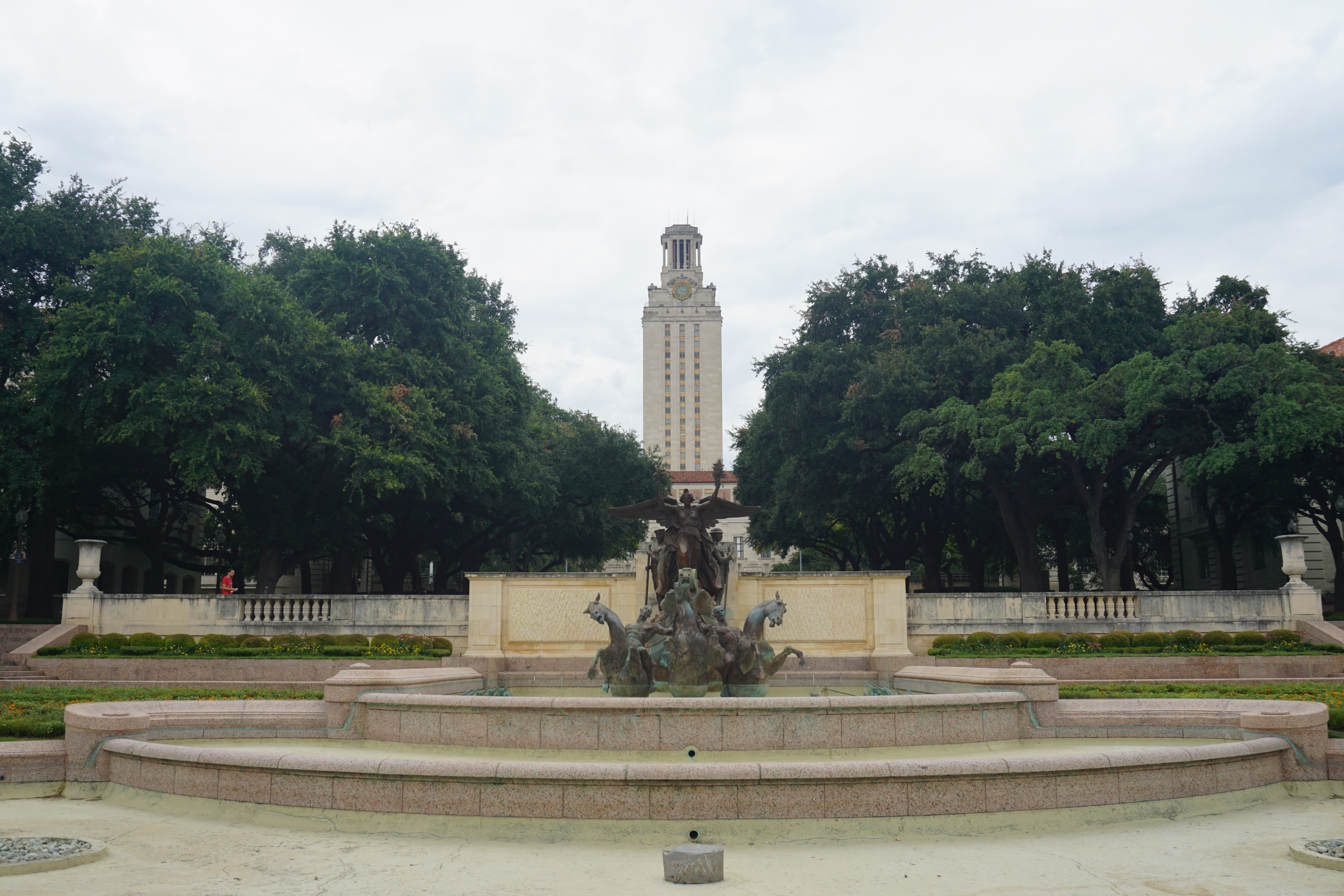
The University of Texas at Austin

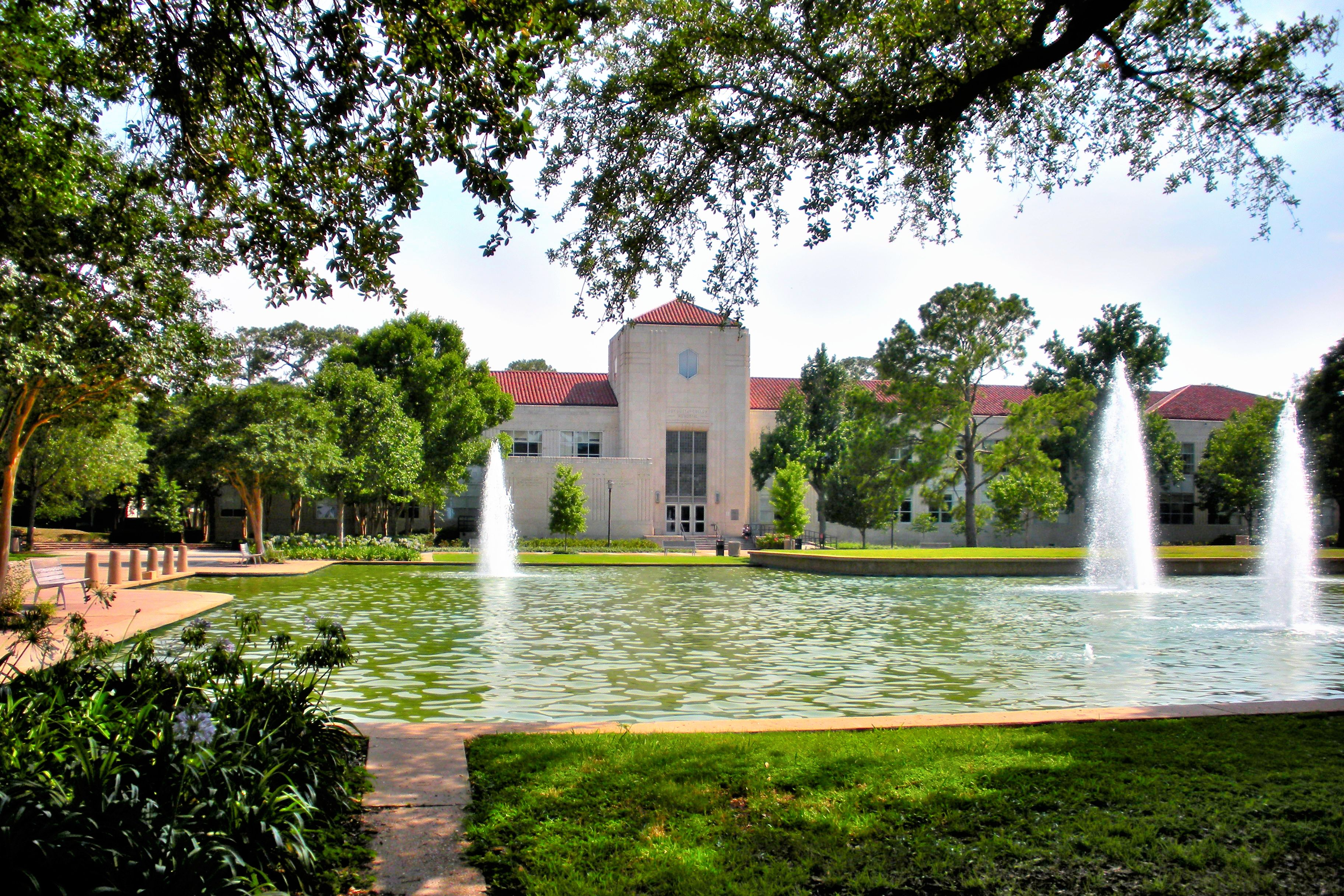
University of Houston

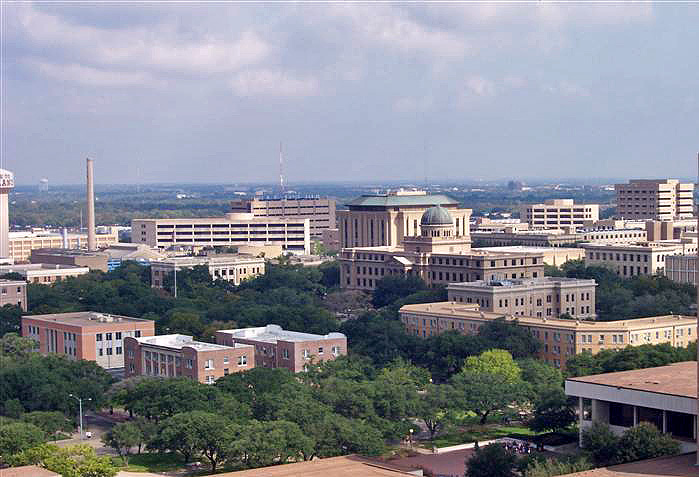
Texas A&M University

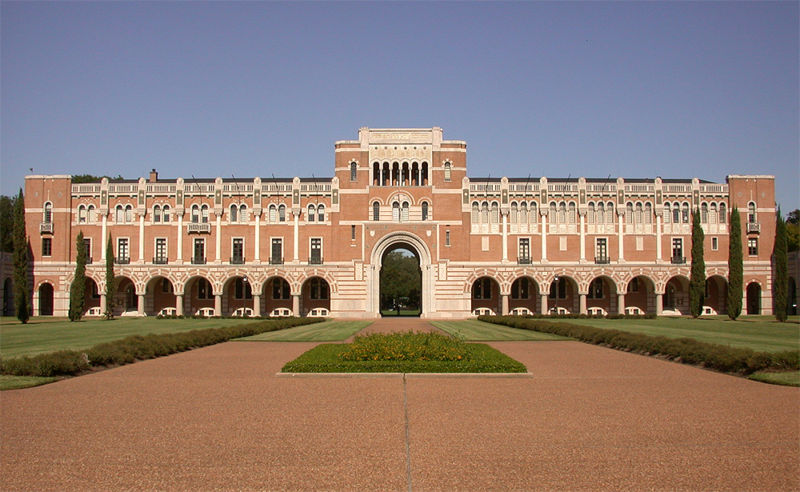
Rice University

The state's two most widely recognized flagship universities are The University of Texas at Austin and Texas A&M University, ranked as the 21st and 41st best universities in the nation according to 2020's latest Center for World University Rankings report, respectively. Some observers also include the University of Houston and Texas Tech University as tier one flagships alongside UT Austin and A&M. The Texas Higher Education Coordinating Board ranks the state's public universities into three distinct tiers:

- National Research Universities (Tier 1)
  - The University of Texas at Austin
  - Texas A&M University
  - Texas Tech University
  - University of Houston
  - Rice University
  - The University of Texas Health Science Center at Houston
  - The University of Texas at Arlington
  - The University of Texas at Dallas
  - The University of North Texas
  - The University of Texas at El Paso
- Emerging Research Universities (Tier 2)
  - The University of Texas at San Antonio
  - Texas State University
- Comprehensive Universities (Tier 3)
  - All other public universities (25 in total)

The Carnegie Foundation classifies six of Texas's universities as Tier One research institutions:

- The University of Texas Health Science Center at Houston
- Rice University
- The University of Texas at Austin
- Texas A&M University
- University of Houston
- Texas Tech University

Texas's alternative affirmative action plan, Texas House Bill 588, guarantees Texas students who graduated in the top 10 percent of their high school class automatic admission to state-funded universities. This does not apply to The University of Texas at Austin, which automatically admits Texas students who graduated in the top 6 percent of their high school class. The bill encourages demographic diversity while attempting to avoid problems stemming from the Hopwood v. Texas (1996) case.

Thirty-six public universities exist in Texas, of which 32 belong to one of the six state university systems. Discovery of minerals on Permanent University Fund land, particularly oil, has helped fund the rapid growth of the state's two largest university systems: the University of Texas System and the Texas A&M System. The four other university systems: the University of Houston System, the University of North Texas System, the Texas State System, and the Texas Tech System are not funded by the Permanent University Fund.

The University of Texas at Austin and Texas A&M University are the flagship universities of the University of Texas System and Texas A&M University System, respectively. Both were established by the Texas Constitution and hold stakes in the Permanent University Fund.

The state has sought to expand the number of flagship universities by elevating some of its seven institutions designated as "emerging research universities". The two expected to emerge first are the University of Houston and Texas Tech University, likely in that order according to discussions on the House floor of the 82nd Texas Legislature.

The state is home to various private institutions of higher learning—ranging from liberal arts colleges to a nationally recognized top-tier research university. Rice University in Houston is one of the leading teaching and research universities of the United States and is ranked the nation's 17th-best overall university by U.S. News & World Report.

Trinity University, a private, primarily undergraduate liberal arts university in San Antonio, has ranked first among universities granting primarily bachelor's and select master's degrees in the Western United States for 20 consecutive years by U.S. News. Private universities include Abilene Christian University, Austin College, Baylor University, University of Mary Hardin–Baylor, and Southwestern University.

Universities in Texas host three presidential libraries: George Bush Presidential Library at Texas A&M University, the Lyndon Baines Johnson Library and Museum at The University of Texas at Austin, and the George W. Bush Presidential Library at Southern Methodist University.

== Healthcare ==
Notwithstanding the concentration of elite medical centers in the state, The Commonwealth Fund ranks the Texas healthcare system the third worst in the nation. Texas ranks close to last in access to healthcare, quality of care, avoidable hospital spending, and equity. In May 2006, Texas initiated the program "code red" in response to the report the state had 25.1 percent of the population without health insurance, the largest proportion in the nation.

The Trust for America's Health ranked Texas 15th highest in adult obesity: 27.2 percent of the state's population is obese. The 2008 Men's Health obesity survey ranked four Texas cities among the top 25 fattest cities in America: Houston ranked 6th, Dallas 7th, El Paso 8th, and Arlington 14th. Texas had only one city (Austin, ranked 21st) in the top 25 "fittest cities" in America. The state is ranked forty-second in the percentage of residents who engage in regular exercise according to a 2007 study.

Texas has the highest maternal mortality rate in the developed world, and the rate by which Texas women died from pregnancy-related complications doubled from 2010 to 2014, to 23.8 per 100,000—a rate unmatched in any other U.S. state or economically developed country. In May 2021, the state legislature passed the Texas Heartbeat Act, which banned abortion from as early as six weeks of pregnancy, except to save the life of the mother. The Act allows private citizens to sue abortion providers and anyone else who assists in an abortion, except for the woman on whom the abortion is performed. On August 25, 2022, another law took effect that made committing abortion at any stage of pregnancy a felony punishable by life in prison.

Access to allergy and immunology specialists in Texas is unevenly distributed. While the state is served by approximately 462 allergists and immunologists, these specialists are primarily concentrated in major urban centers such as Dallas, Houston, and Austin. In rural areas of Texas, the average availability is significantly lower, with approximately one specialist for every 50,000 residents.

=== Medical research ===
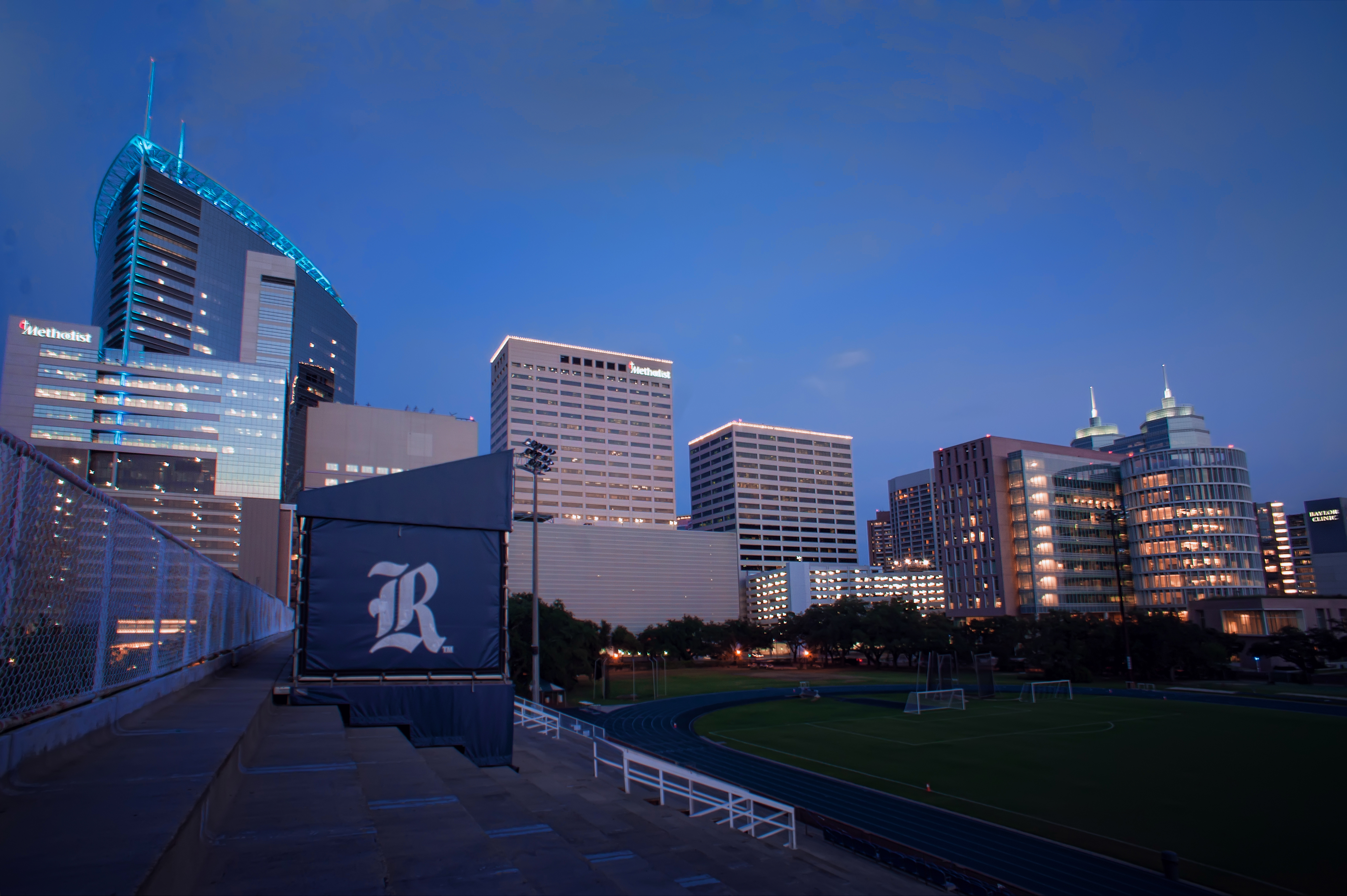
The Texas Medical Center in Houston

Texas has many elite research medical centers. The state has 15 medical schools, four dental schools, and two optometry schools. Texas has two Biosafety Level 4 (BSL-4) laboratories: one at The University of Texas Medical Branch (UTMB) in Galveston, and the other at the Southwest Foundation for Biomedical Research in San Antonio—the first privately owned BSL-4 lab in the United States.

The Texas Medical Center in Houston holds the world's largest concentration of research and healthcare institutions, with over 50 member institutions. Texas Medical Center performs the most heart transplants in the world. The University of Texas M. D. Anderson Cancer Center in Houston is a highly regarded academic institution that centers around cancer patient care, research, education and prevention.

San Antonio's South Texas Medical Center facilities rank sixth in clinical medicine research impact in the United States. The University of Texas Health Science Center is another highly ranked research and educational institution in San Antonio.

Both the American Heart Association and the University of Texas Southwestern Medical Center call Dallas home. The institution's medical school employs the most medical school Nobel laureates in the world.

== Government and politics ==
The current Texas Constitution was adopted in 1876. Like many states, it explicitly provides for a separation of powers. The state's Bill of Rights is much larger than its federal counterpart, and has provisions unique to Texas.

=== State government ===
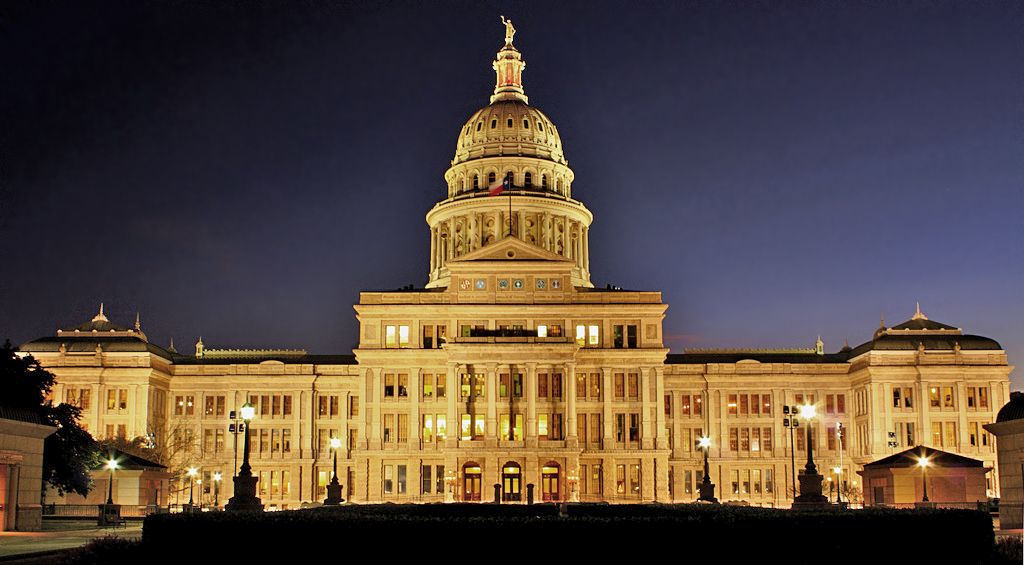
The Texas State Capitol at night

Texas has a plural executive branch system limiting the power of the governor, which is a weak executive compared to some other states. Except for the secretary of state, voters elect executive officers independently; candidates are directly answerable to the public, not the governor. This election system has led to some executive branches split between parties and reduced the ability of the governor to carry out a program. When Republican president George W. Bush served as Texas's governor, the state had a Democratic lieutenant governor, Bob Bullock. The executive branch positions consist of the governor, lieutenant governor, comptroller of public accounts, land commissioner, attorney general, agriculture commissioner, the three-member Texas Railroad Commission, the State Board of Education, and the secretary of state.

The bicameral Texas Legislature consists of the House of Representatives, with 150 members, and a Senate, with 31 members. The Speaker of the House leads the House, and the lieutenant governor, the Senate. The Legislature meets in regular session biennially for just over a hundred days, but the governor can call for special sessions as often as desired (notably, the Legislature cannot call itself into session). The state's fiscal year begins September 1.

The judiciary of Texas is among the most complex in the United States, with many layers and overlapping jurisdictions. Texas has two courts of last resort: the Texas Supreme Court, for civil cases, and the Texas Court of Criminal Appeals. Except for some municipal benches, partisan elections select judges at all levels of the judiciary; the governor fills vacancies by appointment. Texas is notable for its use of capital punishment, having led the country in executions since capital punishment was reinstated in the Gregg v. Georgia case.

The Texas Ranger Division of the Texas Department of Public Safety is a law enforcement agency with statewide jurisdiction. Over the years, the Texas Rangers have investigated crimes ranging from murder to political corruption. They have acted as riot police and as detectives, protected the Texas governor, tracked down fugitives, and functioned as a paramilitary force. The Texas Rangers were unofficially created by Stephen F. Austin in 1823 and formally constituted in 1835. The Rangers were integral to several important events of Texas history and some of the best-known criminal cases in the history of the Old West.

The Texas constitution defines the responsibilities of county governments, which serve as agents of the state. Commissioners court and court judges are elected to serve as the administrative arm. Most cities in the state, those over 5,000 in population, have home-rule governments. The vast majority of these have charters for council-manager forms of government, by which voters elect council members, who hire a professional city manager as an operating officer.

=== Politics ===
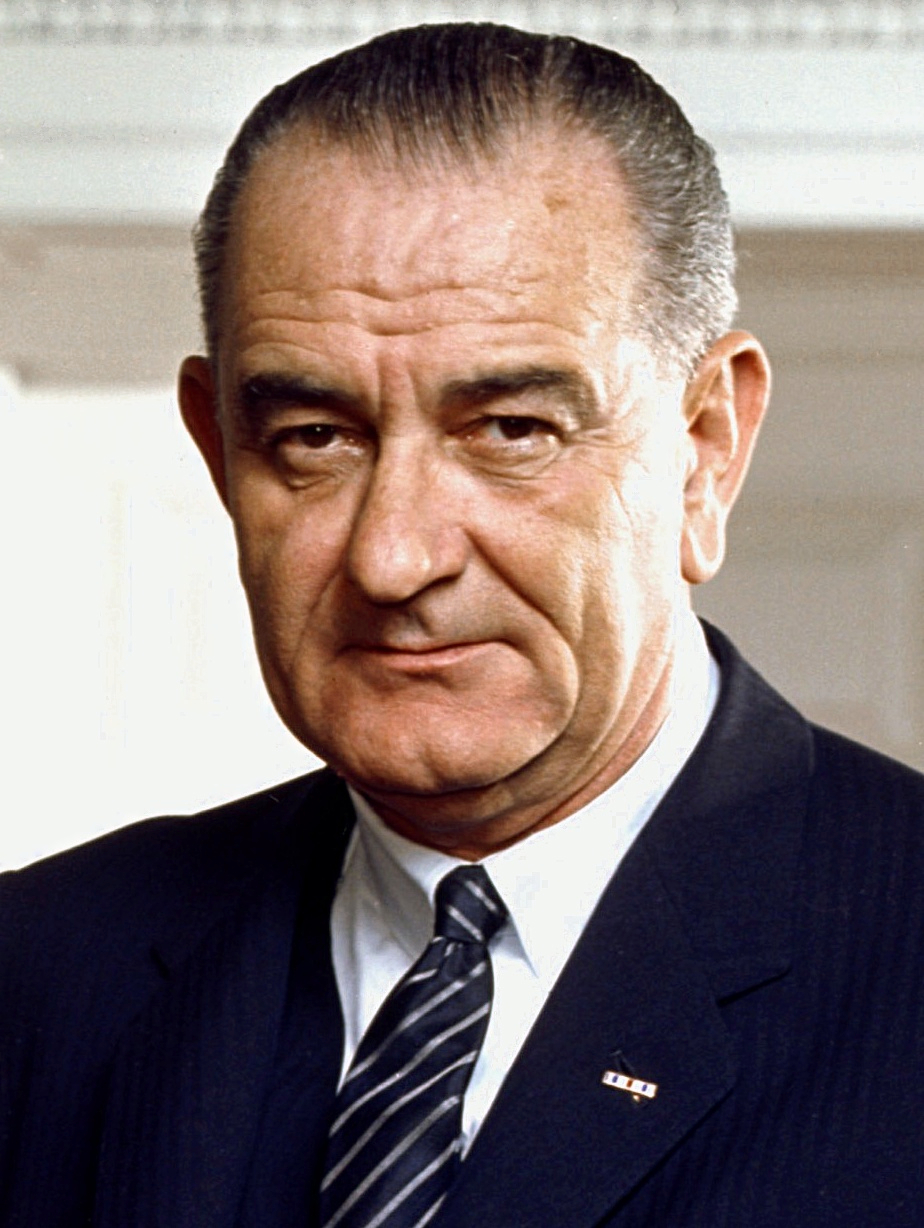
Lyndon B. Johnson of Texas, 36th president of the United States

George W. Bush of Texas, 43rd president of the United States

Texas has historically supported the Republican Party in U.S. and statewide elections since the late 20th century. Republicans won every statewide election from 1994 to 2026, and the last time Texas voted for a Democratic presidential candidate was for Jimmy Carter in 1976.

The Democratic Party dominated Texas politics from the turn of the 20th century, imposing racial segregation and white supremacy. It held power until after passage in the mid-1960s of national civil rights legislation enforcing constitutional rights of all citizens. The party returned to power in the state after the 2026 midterm elections, when Democrats won all statewide elections, ending Republicans' 32-year electoral winning streak in the state.

The state's conservative White voters began to support Republican presidential candidates by the mid-20th century. After this period, they supported Republicans for local and state offices as well, and most Whites became Republican Party members. The party also attracted some minorities, but many have continued to vote for Democratic candidates. The shift to the Republican Party is much-attributed to the fact the Democratic Party became increasingly liberal during the 20th century, and thus increasingly out-of-touch with the average Texas voter. As Texas was always a conservative state, voters switched to the Republicans, which now more closely reflected their beliefs. Commentators have also attributed the shift to Republican political consultant Karl Rove, who managed numerous political campaigns in Texas in the 1980s and 1990s. Other stated reasons included court-ordered redistricting and the growing Sun Belt cities' conservatism unlike the liberal tradition of their northeastern counterparts as well as the popularity of Republican party in the suburbs.

The 2003 Texas redistricting of Congressional districts led by Republican Tom DeLay, was called by The New York Times "an extreme case of partisan gerrymandering". A group of Democratic legislators, the "Texas Eleven", fled the state in a quorum-busting effort to prevent the legislature from acting, but was unsuccessful. The state had already redistricted following the 2000 census. Despite these efforts, the legislature passed a map heavily in favor of Republicans, based on 2000 data and ignoring the estimated nearly one million new residents in the state since then. Career attorneys and analysts at the Department of Justice objected to the plan as diluting the votes of African American and Hispanic voters, but political appointees overrode them and approved it. Legal challenges to the redistricting reached the national Supreme Court in the case League of United Latin American Citizens v. Perry (2006), but the court ruled in favor of the state (and Republicans).

In the 2014 Texas elections, the Tea Party movement made large gains, with numerous Tea Party favorites being elected into office, including Dan Patrick as lieutenant governor, Ken Paxton as attorney general, in addition to numerous other candidates including conservative Republican Greg Abbott as governor.

Texas voters lean toward fiscal conservatism, while enjoying the benefits of significant federal investment in the state in military and other facilities achieved by the power of the Solid South in the 20th century. They also tend to have socially conservative values.

Since 1980, most Texas voters have supported Republican presidential candidates. Austin, Dallas, Houston, San Antonio, and El Paso consistently lean Democratic in both local and statewide elections. Residents of counties along the Rio Grande closer to the Mexico–United States border, where there are many Latino residents, generally vote for Democratic Party candidates, while most other rural and suburban areas of Texas have shifted to voting for Republican Party candidates.

In the 119th United States Congress, 25 of the 38 congressional districts in Texas are held by Republicans and the other 13 by Democrats. Texas's Senators are John Cornyn and Ted Cruz. Between 1988 and 2026, Texans did not elect any Democrats to the United States Senate. This pattern was disrupted in 2026 with the election of Democrat James Talarico. Prior to Talarico's victory, the last Democrat to represent Texas in the US Senate was Lloyd Bentsen.

The state's Democratic voters are made up primarily by liberal and minority groups in Austin, Beaumont, Dallas, El Paso, Houston, and San Antonio as well as minority voters in East and South Texas. According to a study by the Cato Institute, Texas ranks last in personal freedom among the states, by factors including incarceration rates, cannabis laws, civil asset forfeiture policies, educational freedom, gambling laws, marriage freedom, and travel freedom.

Lesser parties that have ballot access are the Green Party and the Libertarian Party.

=== Criminal law ===
Texas has a reputation for very harsh penalties for criminal offenses. It is one of the 32 states that practice capital punishment, and since the US Supreme Court allowed capital punishment to resume in 1976, 40% of all U.S. executions have taken place in Texas. In 2018, Texas had the 8th highest incarceration rate in the U.S. Texas also has strong right of self-defense and self defense laws, allowing citizens to use lethal force to defend themselves, their families, or their property. Texas has one of the strictest abortion bans in the country.

== See also ==
- Outline of Texas
- Index of Texas-related articles
- List of people from Texas
- USS Texas, 4 ships

== Bibliography ==
- Buenger, Walter L., and Arnoldo De Leon, eds. Beyond Texas through time: breaking away from past interpretations (Texas A&M UP, 2011); historiography.
- Calvert, Robert A. et al. The History of Texas (5th edition. Wiley Blackwell. 2014), a standard scholarly history. online
- Campbell, Randolph B. Gone to Texas: a History of the Lone Star State (Oxford University Press, 2003, 500 pages) online
- Chipman, Donald E. (1992). Spanish Texas, 1519–1821. University of Texas Press. ISBN 978-0-292-77659-3.
- Davis, William C. (2006). Lone Star Rising. Texas A&M University Press. ISBN 978-1-58544-532-5. originally published 2004 by New York: Free Press Lone Star Rising at Google Books
- Edmondson, J.R. (2000), The Alamo Story: From History to Current Conflicts, Plano: Republic of Texas Press, ISBN 978-1-55622-678-6
- Fehrenbach, T.R. (2000) [1968]. Lone Star: A History of Texas and the Texans. Open Road Media. ISBN 978-1-4976-0970-9.
- Hardin, Stephen L. (1994). Texian Iliad: A Military History of the Texas Revolution, 1835-1836. University of Texas Press. ISBN 978-0-292-79252-4.
- Hatch, Rosie, ed. Texas Almanac 2024–2025 (2023); summary of contents
  - Regan, Brett. ed. Texas Almanac 2026–2027 (2025); richly detailed coverage in 700 pages; newest edition.
- Manchaca, Martha (2001). Recovering History, Constructing Race: The Indian, Black, and White Roots of Mexican Americans. The Joe R. and Teresa Lozano Long Series in Latin American and Latino Art and Culture. University of Texas Press. ISBN 978-0-292-75253-5.
- Richardson, Rupert N.; Wintz, Cary D.; Boswell, Angela; Anderson, Adrian; Wallace, Ernest (2021). Texas: The Lone Star State (Eleventh ed.). Taylor & Francis. ISBN 9781000403763.
- Storey, John W., and Mary L Kelley, eds. Twentieth-century Texas: A social and cultural history. (U of North Texas Press, 2008)..
- Todish, Timothy J.; Todish, Terry; Spring, Ted (1998). Alamo Sourcebook, 1836: A Comprehensive Guide to the Battle of the Alamo and the Texas Revolution. Eakin Press. ISBN 978-1-57168-152-2.
- Report of President's Commission on the assassination of President John F. Kennedy. (1992). The Warren Commission Report. Warren Commission Hearings. Vol. IV. National Archives. ISBN 978-0-312-08257-4. Archived from the original on May 25, 2017.
- Weber, David J. (1992). The Spanish Frontier in North America. Yale Western Americana Series. Yale University Press. ISBN 978-0-300-05198-8.
- Weddle, Robert S. (1995). Changing Tides: Twilight and Dawn in the Spanish Sea, 1763–1803. Centennial Series of the Association of Former Students Number 58. Texas A&M University Press. ISBN 978-0-89096-661-7.
- Winders, Richard Bruce (2004). Sacrificed at the Alamo: Tragedy and Triumph in the Texas Revolution. Military History of Texas Series: Number Three. State House Press. ISBN 978-1-880510-80-3.
