= 77 Diamonds =

British jewellery retailer

77 Diamonds is a British jewellery retailer, that sells diamonds, engagement rings and other fine jewellery through its website and its own showrooms. The company buys stones directly from diamond manufacturers rather than through wholesalers, and makes its jewellery to order in a workshop in central London.

== History ==
The company was founded by Tobias Kormind, who worked as an investment banker at the time but also ran an online marketing agency, and Vadim Weinig, whose family owned a chain of diamond dealers in Antwerp. 77 Diamonds Limited was registered on 1 June 2004. Kormind purchased the company from the marketing agency in 2008. It takes its name from 1477 when Archduke Maximilian of Austria allegedly gave Mary of Burgundy a diamond engagement ring.

At that time, very few jewellers offered diamonds for sale over the internet and the main challenge of the company was to convince potential customers that a diamond can be selected and purchased online without visiting the store.

The ownership of the company changed from the marketing agency to Kormind in 2008; the company's website was also redesigned in that year. As a result of the redesign, annual revenue increased from £100,000 to £1 million and the company funded this process from its trading profits rather than seeking investment from external sources.

The company opened its own workshop in 2012, having until then outsourced most of its manufacturing.

In 2016, Kormind was listed among Professional Jeweller's Hot 100 alongside the company's creative director, David Allen. The company also experienced increased costs because the price of diamonds in the United Kingdom increased by 15 to 20 per cent following the EU membership referendum in 2016. At the 2017 Professional Jeweller Awards, 77 Diamonds won Online-only Jewellery Retailer of the Year, while its head of design won Young Jewellery Designer of the Year. In 2019, the company employed 64 people; it had clients in 72 countries and showrooms in London, Manchester and Frankfurt.

As per December 2021, overseas sales accounted for 40 per cent of the total, compared to about 15 per cent prior to the onset of the COVID-19 pandemic. Kormind said that about 60 per cent of customers purchase diamonds without visiting a showroom and Brexit experience was "properly painful". The company established two European entities in response to the situation; IT support in Portugal and production in Germany.

77 Diamonds won Digital Innovator of the Year at the Professional Jeweller Awards again in 2021.

The company opened a showroom on Place Vendôme in Paris in July 2025, as well as its third showroom in Switzerland in Basel in September. On 15 December 2025, 77 Diamonds was highlighted in a segment devoted to laboratory-grown diamonds and UK jewellery market on the BBC Radio 4 programme You and Yours. As of 2026, the company also had a boutique in Copenhagen.
