= The Kitchen Maid (Rembrandt) =

1651 painting by Rembrandt van Rijn

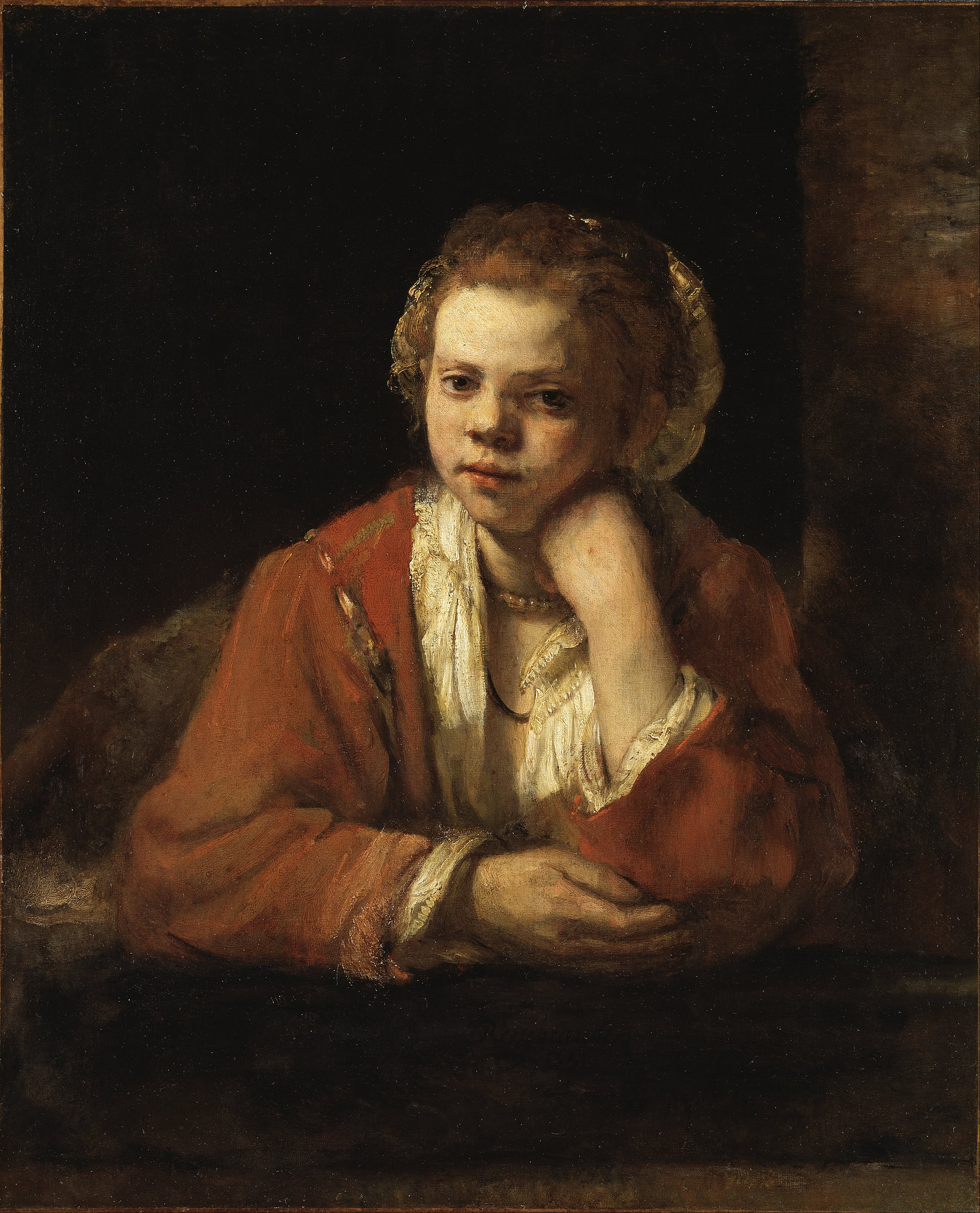
- Artist: Rembrandt
- Year: 1651
- Medium: oil on canvas
- Dimensions: 78 cm × 64 cm (31 in × 25 in)
- Location: Nationalmuseum, Stockholm

The Kitchen Maid (1651) is an oil-on-canvas painting by the Dutch painter Rembrandt. It is an example of Dutch Golden Age painting and is now in the collection of the Nationalmuseum in Stockholm, Sweden.

This painting was documented by Hofstede de Groot in 1915, who wrote:

330. A YOUNG GIRL AT A WINDOW, IN FULL FACE. Sm. 506.; Bode 365; Dut. 315; Wb. 440; B.-HdG. 397. She leans her right arm on the window-sill and rests her head on her left hand. She wears a dull red jacket. Her dark hair is combed back into a small golden-yellow cap. The loose chemisette is slightly open at the throat, showing a string of pearls and a little black ribbon hanging down on the bosom. Dark background; the figure is lighted from above to the left. Half-length, life size. Formerly known as "La Crasseuse." Signed in the centre at foot, "Rembrandt f. 1651"; canvas, 31 inches by 25 inches. Etched by L. Loewenstam. Mentioned by Bode, pp. 504, 606; by Dutuit, p. 40; by Michel, pp. 394, 568 [304-5,442]; by Roger de Piles, 1715 edition, p. 423; by Granberg, Inventaire Génerale, iii. No. 297. In the collection of Roger de Piles, Paris. In the collection of Duvivier, Paris. In the collection of the Comte d'Hoym, Paris. In the collection of De Morville, Paris. Sales. Angran de Fonspertuis, Paris, March 4, 1748, No. 435 (2001 francs, with 203, "Flora," Blondel de Gagny). Blondel de Gagny, Paris, December 10, 1776, No. 70 (6000 francs); it was then rounded at top and measured only 32 inches in height. Duc de Lavalliere, Paris, February 21, 1781 (5500 francs, with pendant, 467/7); see C. Blanc, ii. 43. In the collection of Gustavus III., King of Sweden. In the Stockholm National Museum, 1900 catalogue, No. 584.

Other "Kitchen Maid" paintings by Rembrandt or his school are:

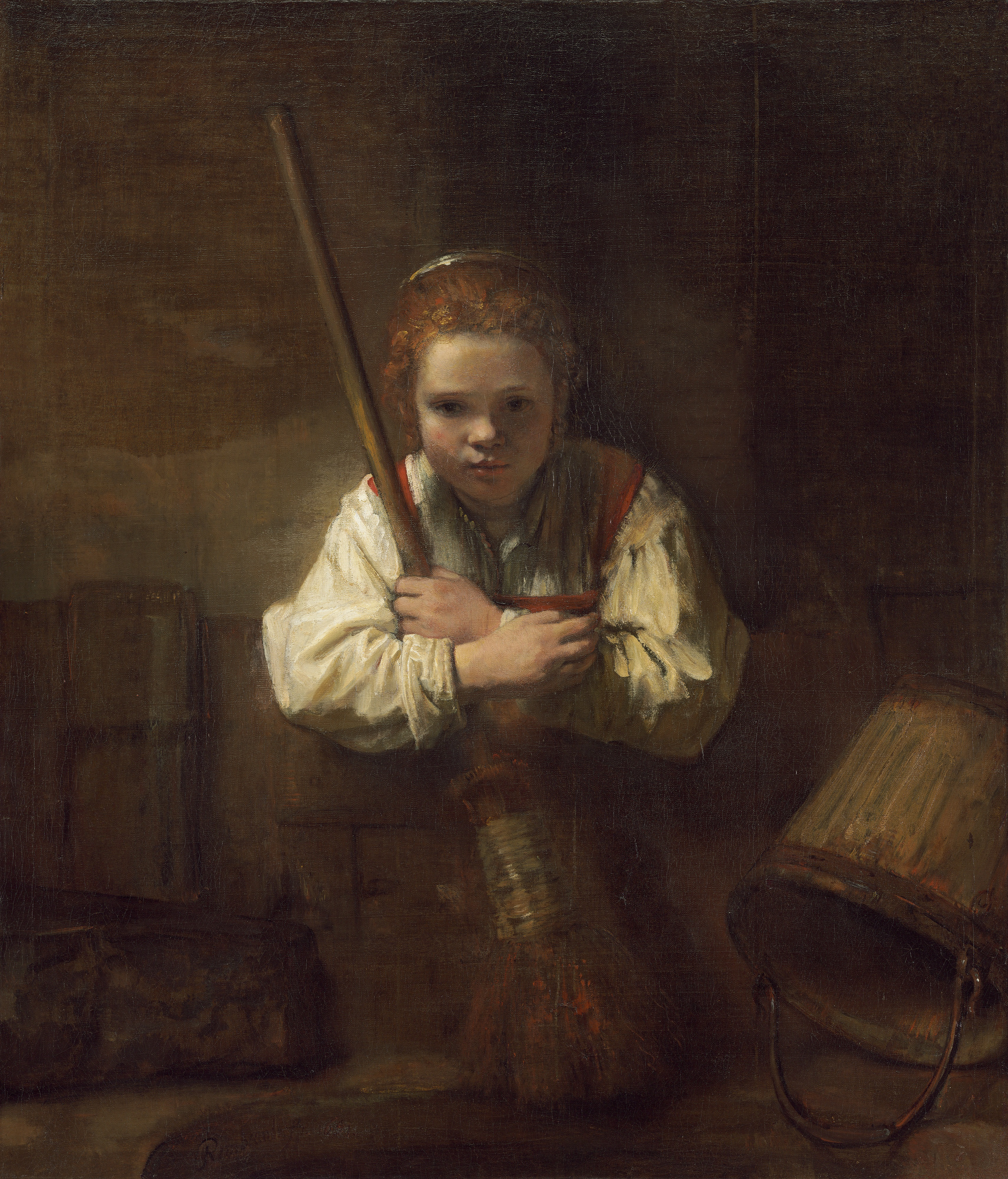
Rembrandt workshop, National Gallery of Art

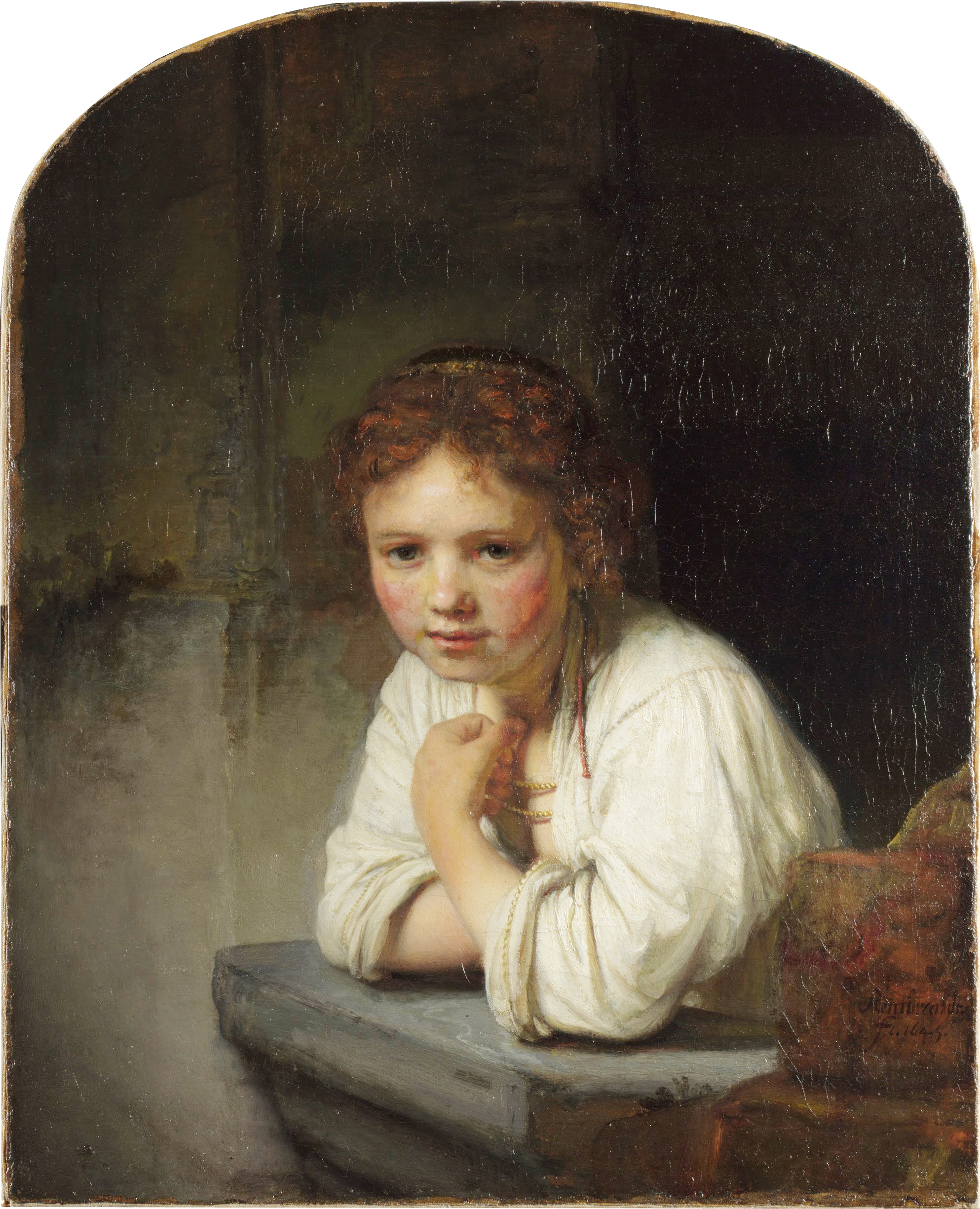
Rembrandt, Dulwich Picture Gallery

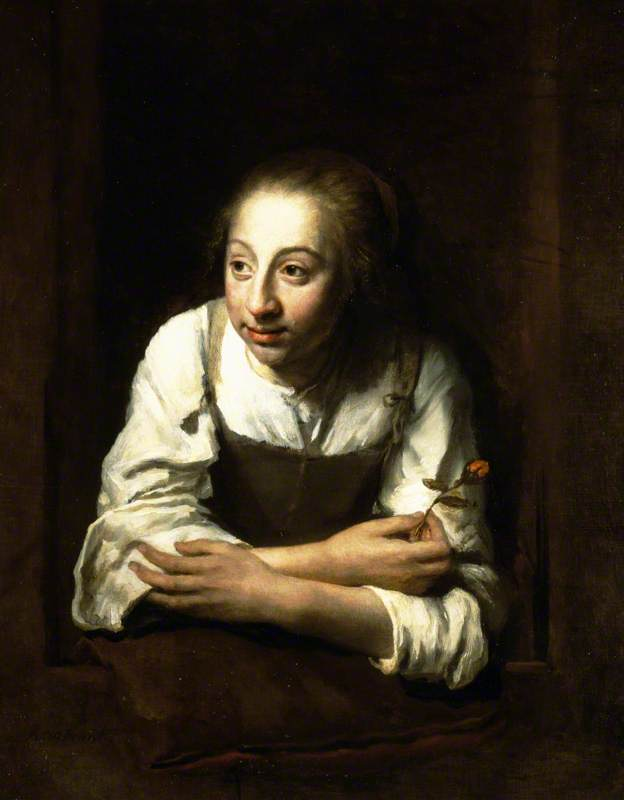
Philips Koninck, Petworth House

== See also ==
- List of paintings by Rembrandt
