= Augustin Blondel de Gagny =

Augustin Blondel de Gagny (French pronunciation: [oɡystɛ̃ blɔ̃dɛl də ɡaɲi]; March 1695 – 9 July 1776) was a French connoisseur of the arts and a collector whose series of Paris auction sales, which took place soon after his death were high-water marks of the history of collecting in 18th-century France. Paintings and sculptures that passed through Blondel de Gagny's collection are dispersed in many of the world's great museums. The prints from his collection are less easily traced.

== Biography ==
His father, Joseph Blondel, was conseiller and general treasurer at the Bâtiments du roi, the establishment in charge of building and maintaining the royal buildings and parks. Joseph purchased the château de Gagny from its Billy heirs in 1706; though it was purchased by the creditors of his estate in 1716, Augustin Blondel de Gagny retained its name. Augustin married Marguerite-Henriette Barbier, who predeceased him.

Due in part to the confidence in his competence shown by Jean-Baptiste de Machault d'Arnouville, from 1750 Augustin Blondel held the post of general treasurer of the Caisse des Amortissements that was intended to pay down the king's debts and from April 1752 that of supervisor of the Menus-Plaisirs du Roi, responsible for ephemeral decorations for all the fêtes of the court of Louis XVI. Part of his duties that must have been pleasant was the supervision of the Opera, for Blondel loved music: the Stradivarius violin "the best known by this master" according to the sale catalogue, which he kept in his little château at Garges-lès-Gonesse (Val d'Oise), was bought at the sale by Paillet, for 601 livres; there were several other violins as well.

In 1759 he took up residence in his late father's hôtel particulier in Place Louis le Grand (Place Vendôme). There his collection of paintings and works of art was among the most visited and commented upon in Paris, after those of the princes. He had made his first public purchases at the sale of the comtesse de Verrue, 1737. By 1745 his place among the most selective collectors was well established: when the marchand-mercier Gersaint returned with paintings he had bought at The Hague, he went first to his patron, Blondel de Gagny, who selected from Gersaint's offerings a Nicolaes Berghem. Among the very few views of a French 18th-century collector's interior, to show how paintings were hung, is Gabriel de Saint-Aubin's drawing of Blondel de Gagny's cabinet intérieure part of the suite of rooms in which his collection was displayed, filling the walls to the cornice but carefully balanced, repeatedly creating pendants and contrasts. Setting off the gilding of frames and the dark patination of bronze statuettes and the white of small marbles, green damask that Hester Thrale noticed covered the walls in at least one of the salons.

Of the rich furnishings, by ébénistes of the calibre of Bernard II van Risamburgh, little has been securely identified, not even Blondel de Gagny's gilt-bronze cartel clock by Charles Cressent a Rococo sculptural composition surmounted by Father Time with his scythe. Blondel was one of the first to revive the taste for the Baroque furniture of André-Charles Boulle; a medal cabinet by Boulle of the familiar design delivered to Louis XIV is already described in the hôtel in 1766 and by the time of his death fully twenty armoires, commodes and tables attributed to the great Boulle or his sons figured in the sale catalogue. There were Chinese lacquer cabinets and boxes, Chinese and Japanese porcelains and those of Vincennes and Sèvres, bronzes and marbles, bronze fire dogs and chimney garnitures by Coustou and Auguste— and 17 fine clocks.

Augustin Blondel de Gagny's own refined taste in paintings ran to Flemish and Dutch old masters of the 17th and 18th century (a Van Dyck Young Man Playing a Lute, Gabriel Metsu, Nicolaes Berghem, Philips Wouwerman, David Teniers the Younger' Prodigal Son), Among his French paintings were Nicolas Poussin's Nourriture de Jupiter and Claude Lorrain's View of the Campo Vaccino, and a port capriccio, all now at the Louvre.

His cabinet, distributed among eleven rooms of the hôtel, was also celebrated for the number and quality of the small bronze sculptures interspersed with porcelains on tables and commodes and chimneypieces. There were the reductions of famous antiquities that would be expected, the usual paired bronze Enlèvement groups after Giambologna and François Girardon, and sculptures by Michel Anguier. Among the refined small bronzes that furnished his apartments was Robert Le Lorrain's Andromeda, now at the Louvre; Le Lorrain's other sculptures in the collection have not been traced: marble busts of a Faun and a Dryad and of Ganymede and Flora in the staircase, and bronzes Air, A Childand two busts of women .

He also purchased the little château de Garges which he rebuilt in neoclassical taste by Pierre Contant d'Ivry; it was modified in the 19th century and has been demolished.

By terms of his will (9 July 1776) the collection was sold to provide capital for his grandchildren. The sum of 405,741 livres was raised by the series of auctions. Louis XVI himself was among the purchasers. Further works of art from his collection appeared in sales of October and November 1783 of his only son, Barthélemy-Augustin Blondel d'Azincourt (1719— 1783), who bought in at the sales a portion of his father's collection.
