= Alonzo C. Webb =

American artist

Alonzo C. Webb (April 1, 1888 – 1975) was an American etcher, architect, painter and illustrator.

== Birth and early life ==
Webb was born in Nashville, Tennessee, United States, the son of Alonzo C. Webb, Sr. and Ellen Hanor. His father was supervisor of writing and drawing for the public schools in Nashville.

From 1907 to 1909, he attended the Art Institute of Chicago. In 1911, he enrolled at The Stout Institute in Wisconsin, where he studied building trades in preparation for a course in architecture. From 1912 to 1913 he studied architecture at the University of Illinois. During 1914 and 1915 he practised in Chicago, winning several medals for architectural designs. He later attended the Art Students League of New York and worked with Dan Barber, a New York architect.

== First World War and life in Europe ==
During the First World War he served with the American Engineering Forces in France, first as a sergeant and then as a commissioned second Lieutenant. After the armistice in 1918 he remained in Europe, and from March to June 1919 attended the art school opened for American soldiers at the A.E.F. Art Training Center in Bellevue, France. In September 1919 he was demobilized from the army and study design in Italy and illustration in Spain and the United Kingdom. After which, he spent the next six months traveling in Europe and seeing as much art as possible until his money was exhausted.

Determined to stay in France, he began looking for a way to make a living in Paris. Unable to work as an architect, he began making signs in English for the millinery shops along the Rue de Rivoli, which led in time to advertisements and designs for some of the fashionable houses along the rue de la Paix and the Place Vendôme. This led to work with a firm manufacturing heating apparatus and Webb applied his old architectural training to radiators and posters illustrating the installation of modern heating plants in Old World chateaux.

About 1920, he started etching and his work began appearing frequently in the French weekly L’Illustration. During the 1920s and 1930s, Webb lived and worked in both France and the United States. He etched many architectural images of France and Italian cities and American centers such as New York, Chicago, and Pittsburg. Many of Webb's European views were published and exhibited by the Marcel Guiot Gallery, Paris.

In the late 1930s he moved to London, where he died in 1975.
