= François Girardon =

French sculptor (1628–1715)

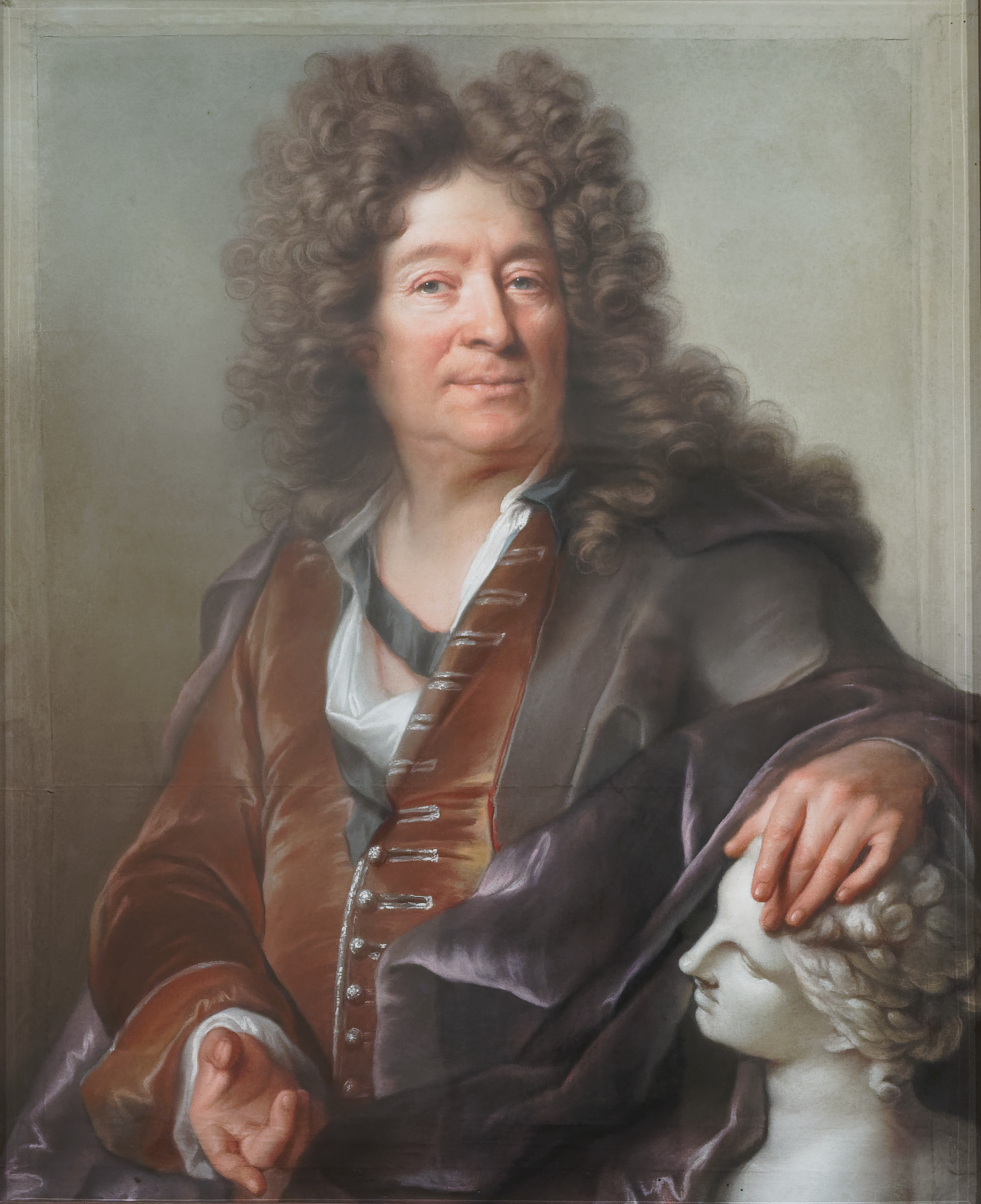
- Girardon with one of his works, a bust identified as of Proserpina, by Joseph Vivien
- Born: 17 March 1628; Troyes, Champagne, France
- Died: 1 September 1715 (aged 87); Paris, France
- Known for: Sculpture
- Movement: Baroque or Style Louis XIV

François Girardon (French: [fʁɑ̃swa ʒiʁaʁdɔ̃]; 17 March 1628 – 1 September 1715) was a French sculptor of the Louis XIV style or French Baroque, best known for his statues and busts of Louis XIV and for his statuary in the gardens of the Palace of Versailles.

== Biography ==
He was born at Troyes. His father was a foundry worker. He was first trained as a joiner and woodcarver. His talent attracted the attention of the Chancellor of Louis XIV, Pierre Séguier, a serious patron of the arts, who arranged for him to work in the studio of François Anguier, and later, from 1648 to 1650 to live and apprentice in Rome. There he saw Baroque sculpture and met Bernini, but he came to reject that style and moved instead toward classicism and the models of ancient Roman sculpture.

In 1650 he returned to France, and became a member of the group of artists, led by Charles Le Brun, the official painter of the King, and including the garden designer André Le Nôtre, who were commissioned to decorate the new royal park of the Chateau of Versailles. His principal contribution was the group of statuary representing Apollo served by the Nymphs, (1666–1675), symbolizing the Sun King himself, placed in a grotto close to the Palace. The figure of Apollo was inspired in form by the Apollo Belvedere of the Vatican, and featured two groups of figures; Apollo surrounded by nymphs, and a second group, next to the grotto, showing The Horses of the Sun being conducted to their royal stable.

He created another fountain for Versailles, the Basin of Saturn or Winter (1672–1677), made of gilded lead, composed in a more baroque style, crowded with figures. His third major work at Versailles was the Kidnapping of Proserpine. This group of statues was located away from the center of the garden, and was designed to be seen from a single point of view. The sense of movement and twisted figures give it a Baroque appearance, but this is balanced by the classical clarity and symmetry of the composition.

Girardon rose steadily in the official artistic hierarchy. He became a member of the Académie Royale de Peinture et de Sculpture in 1657, was raised to professor, in 1674 assistant to the Rector. In 1690, on the death of Le Brun, he became inspector general of works of sculpture, governing all royal sculptural commissions. In 1695, he became Chancellor of the Royal Academy.

In 1675 he received another important commission, for the tomb of Cardinal Richelieu, located in the Chapel of the Sorbonne. It was completed in 1694. The figure of the Cardinal is shown seated on the tomb but alive, sitting up and looking toward the altar. (The tomb was originally placed in the choir of the church, but has since been moved to a separate chapel). He is accompanied by figures of two grieving women representing Religion and science. The tomb was completed in 1694, and had considerable influence on the design of later funeral sculpture. It was nearly destroyed by a mob during the French Revolution, but was protected by the archeologist Alexandre Lenoir, who received a bayonet wound in its defense. He had it moved to safety in the first museum of French monuments.

In 1699, Girardon completed another major work, a bronze equestrian statue of Louis XIV, which was placed in the center in the center of Place Louis le Grand (now Place Vendôme). This statue was melted down during the French Revolution and is now known only by a small bronze model made by Girardon himself, in the Louvre, He died in Paris in 1715.

Other notable work of Girardon that can still be seen include Tomb of Louvois in the Church of (St-Eustache) in Paris; the tomb of Bignon, the King's librarian, made in 1656, in (St-Nicolas du Chardonnet); and decorative sculptures in the Gallery of Apollo and the King's Bedroom in the Louvre.

The municipal museum of his birthplace of Troyes has several of his works, marble busts of Louis XIV and Maria Theresa. The Town Hall displays a medallion of Louis XIV, and the Church of Saint Remy displays a bronze crucifix he made.

== Sculpture ==
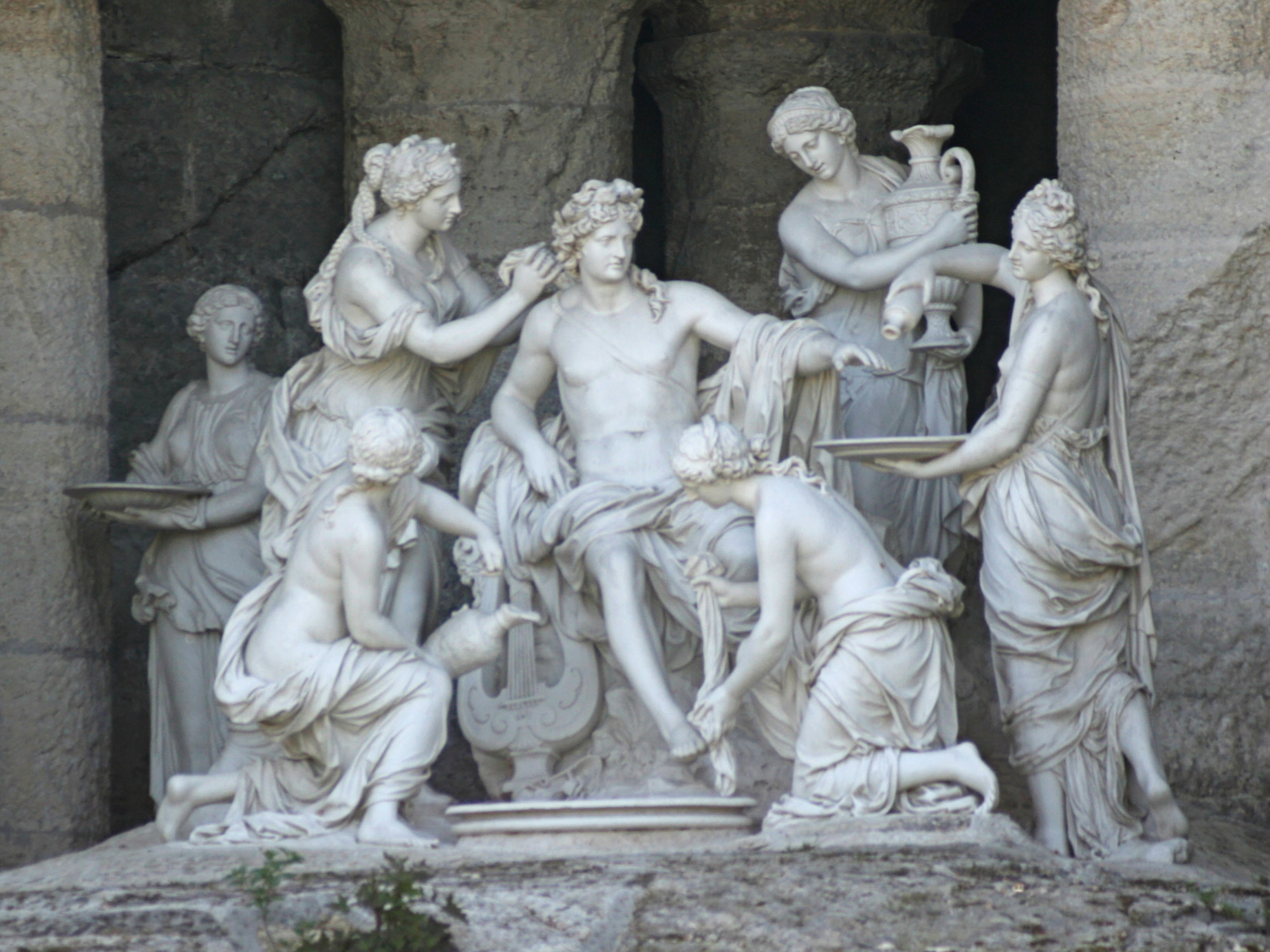
Apollo being served by the nymphs, Grotto of the grove of the baths of Apollo, Palace of Versailles (1666–1675)

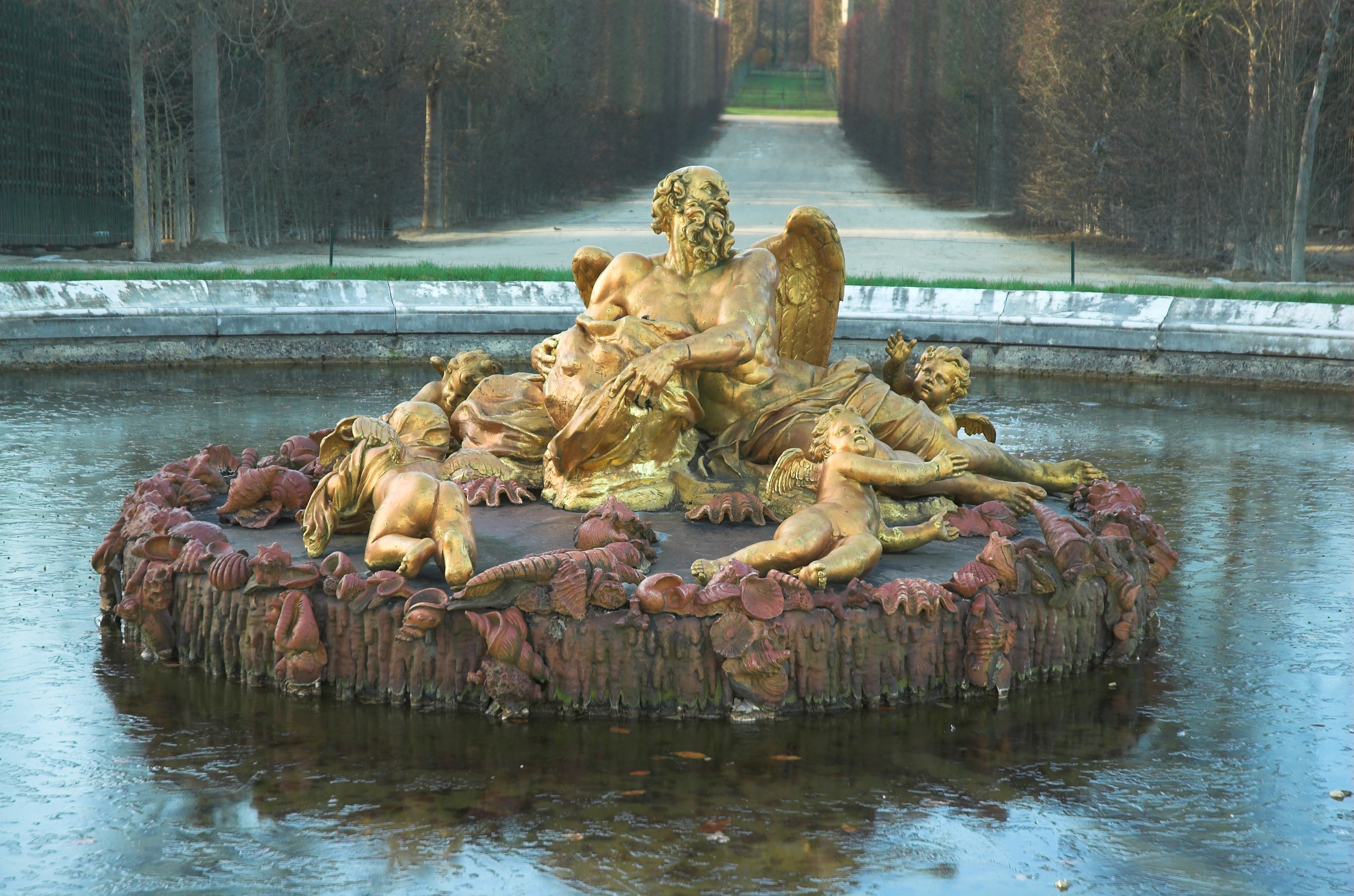
Basin of Saturn, Palace of Versailles (1672–1677)

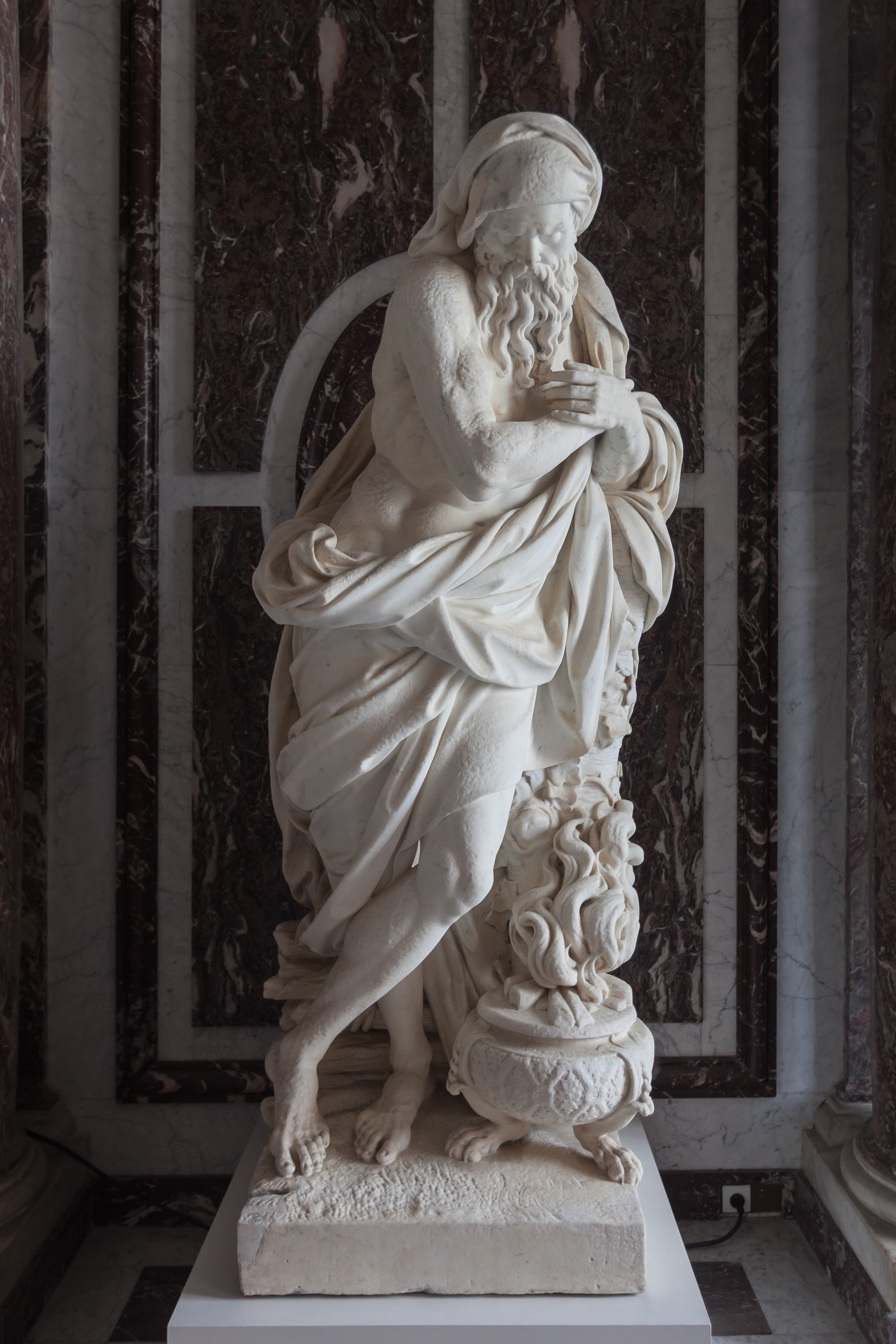
Winter, Palace of Versailles

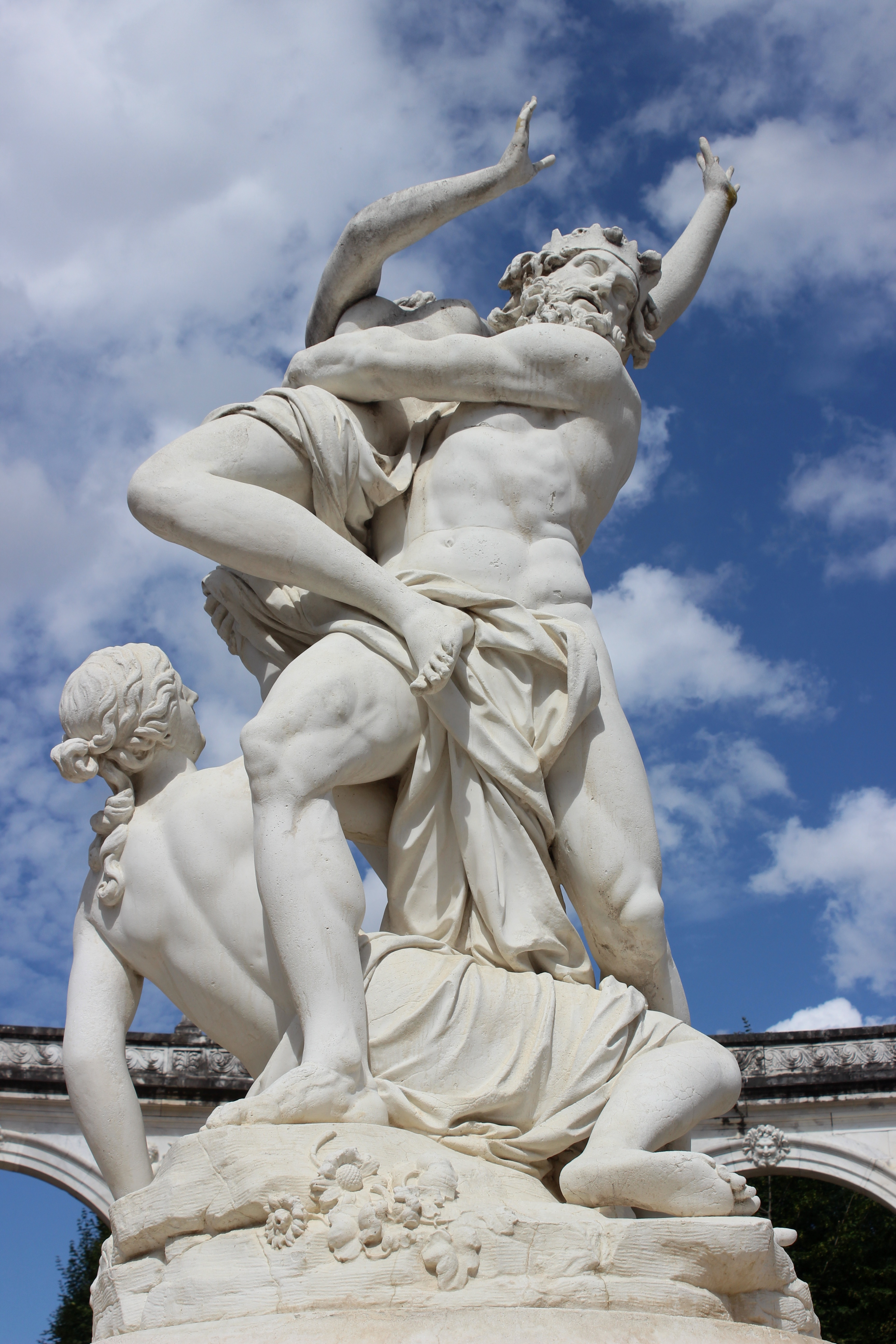
The kidnapping of Proserpina by Pluto (1677–1699), Palace of Versailles

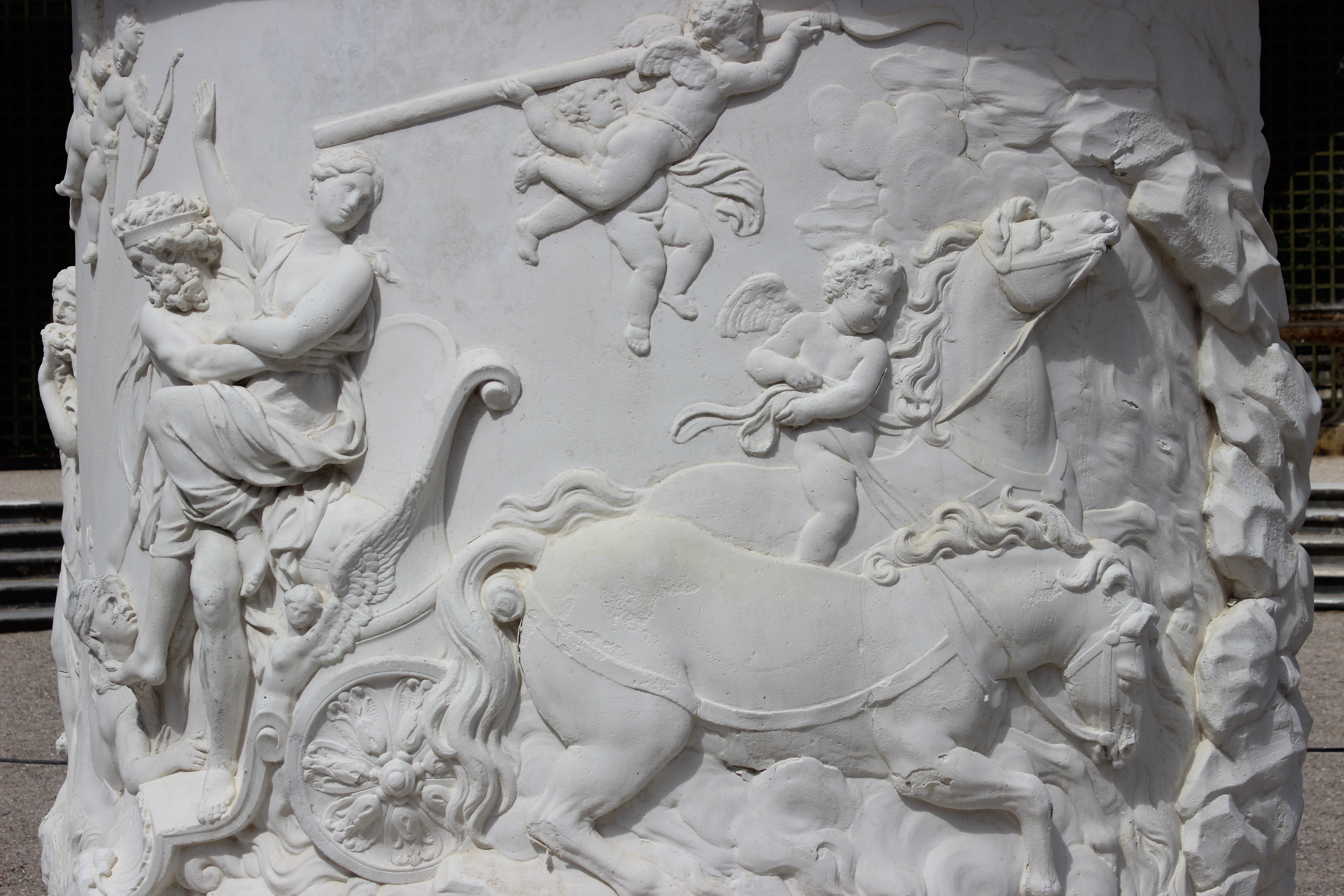
Sculpture on the base of The Kidnapping of Proserpina by Pluto

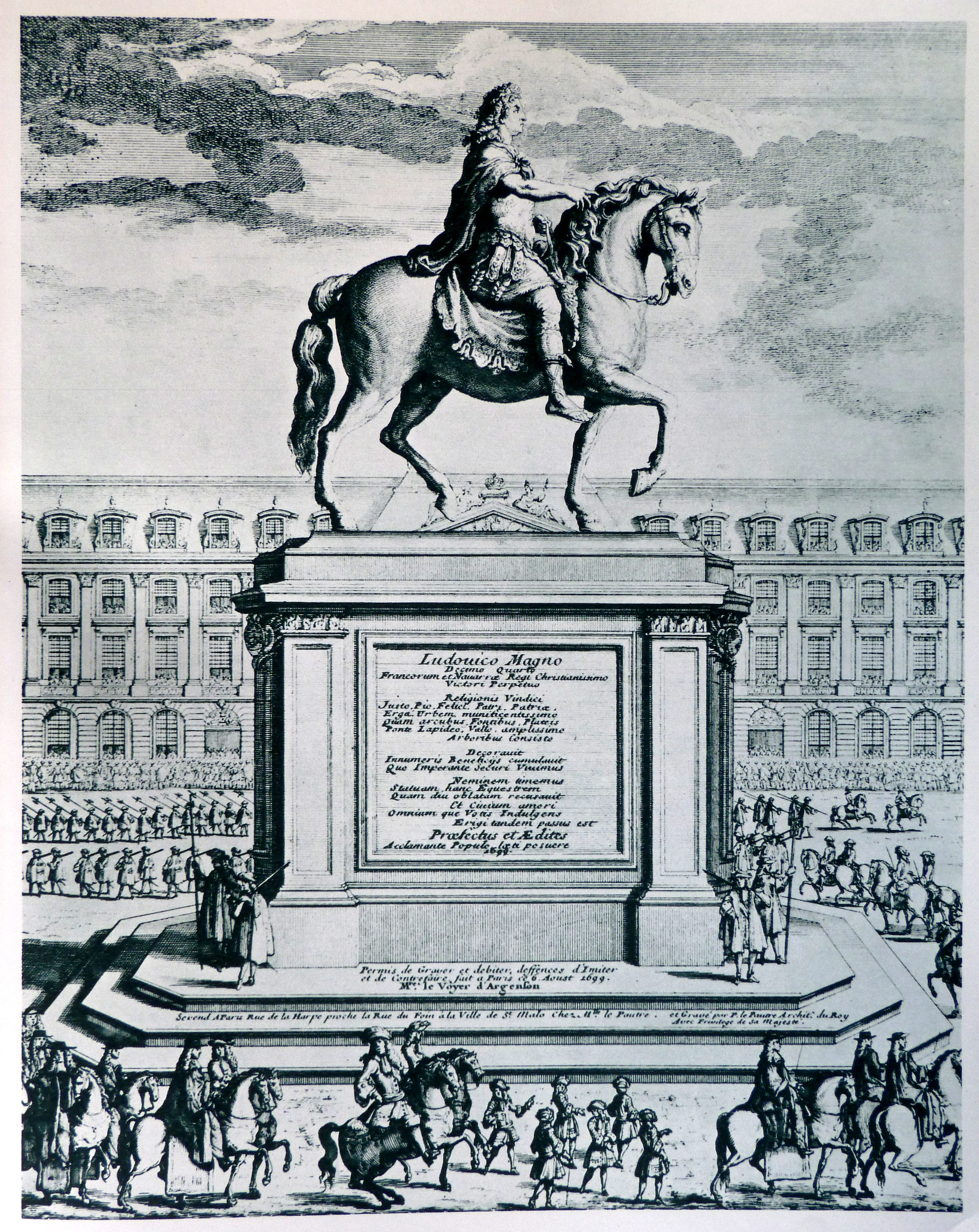
Monument to Louis XIV in the Place Vendôme (1692), destroyed 1789–92

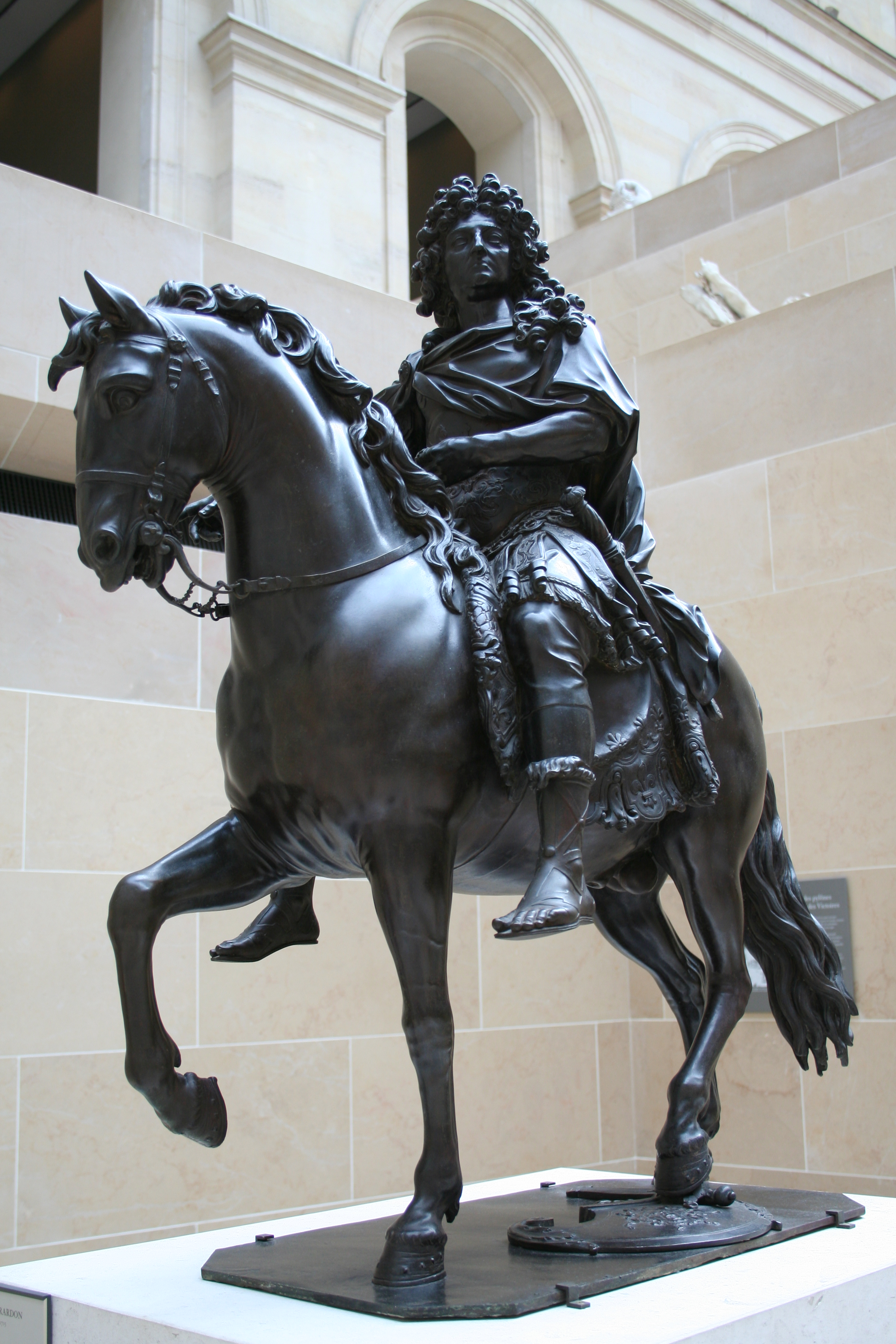
François Girardon, model of statue of Louis XIV for the Place Vendôme 1692, Louvre

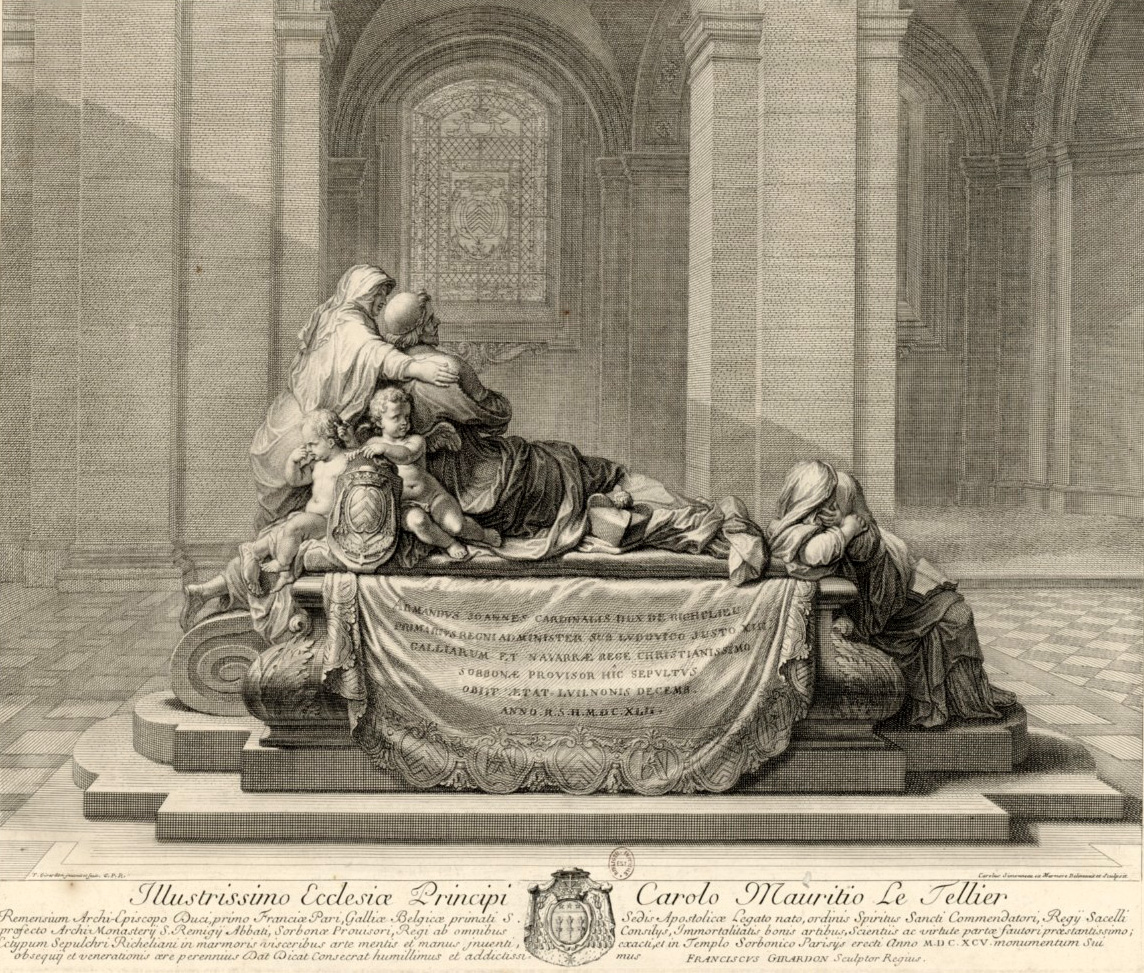
The tomb of Cardinal Richelieu, Chapel of the Sorbonne (1675–1694)

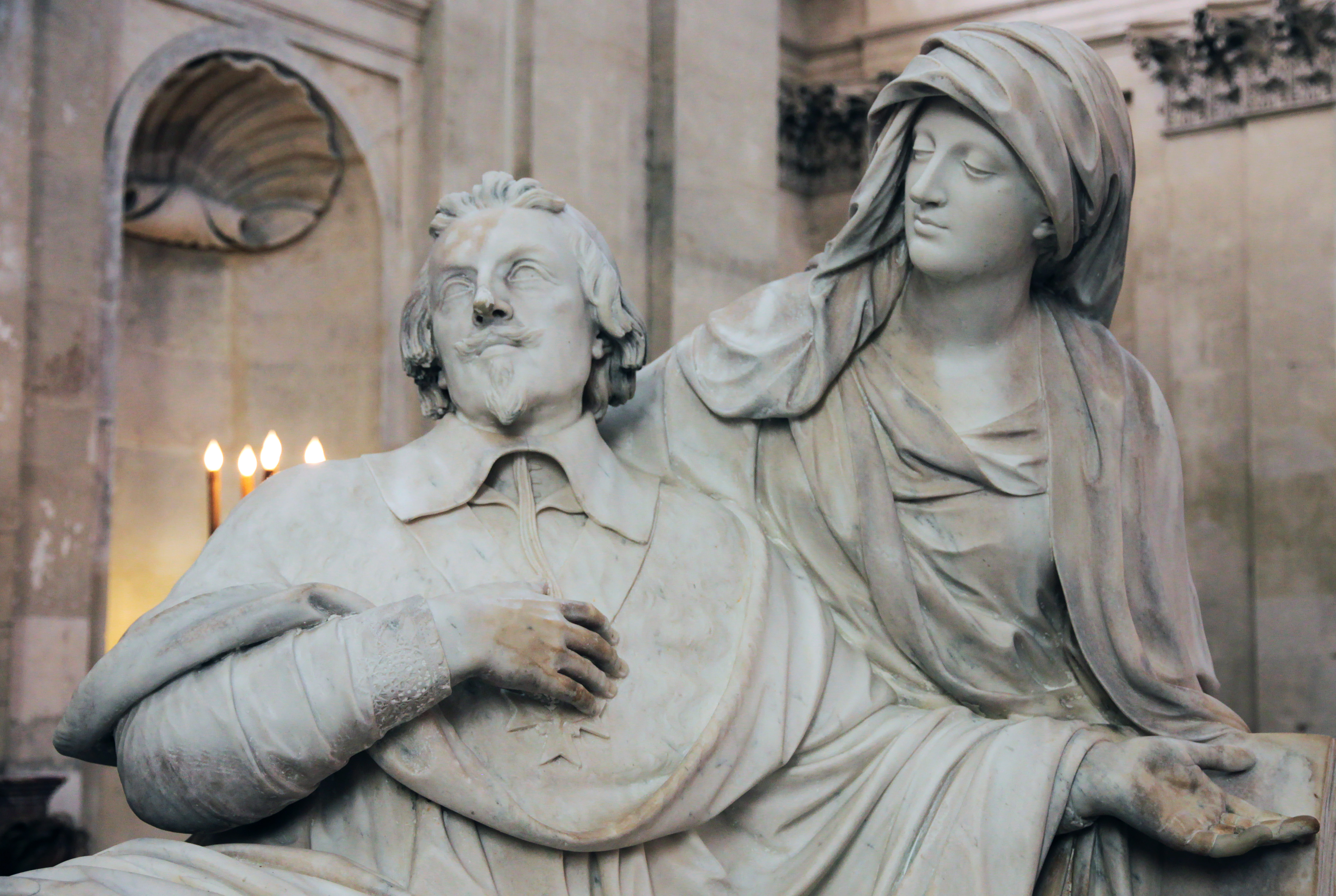
Detail of the tomb of Cardinal Richelieu, Chapel of the Sorbonne, (1675–1694)

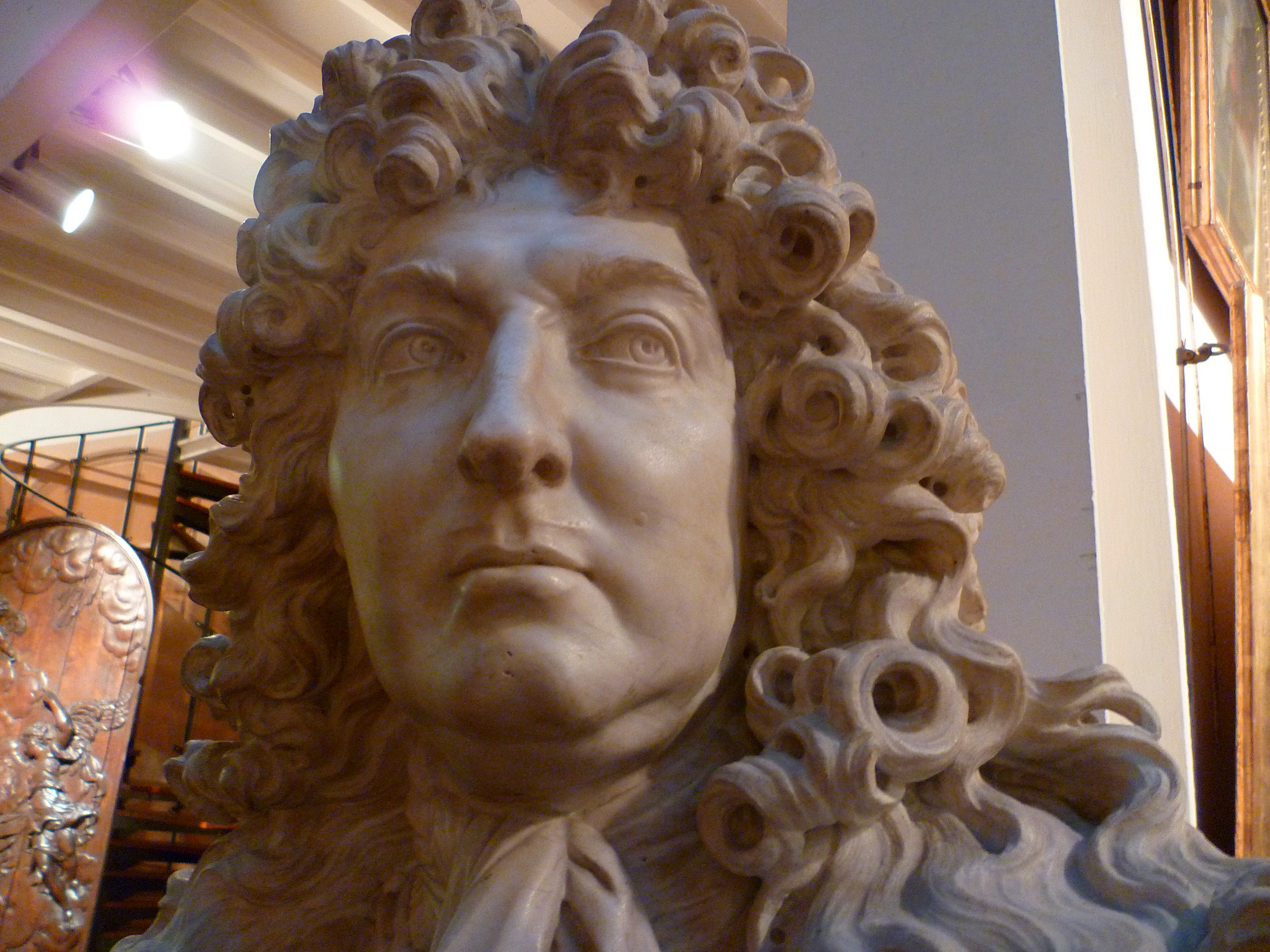
Bust of Louis XIV, Musée Saint-Loup, Troyes

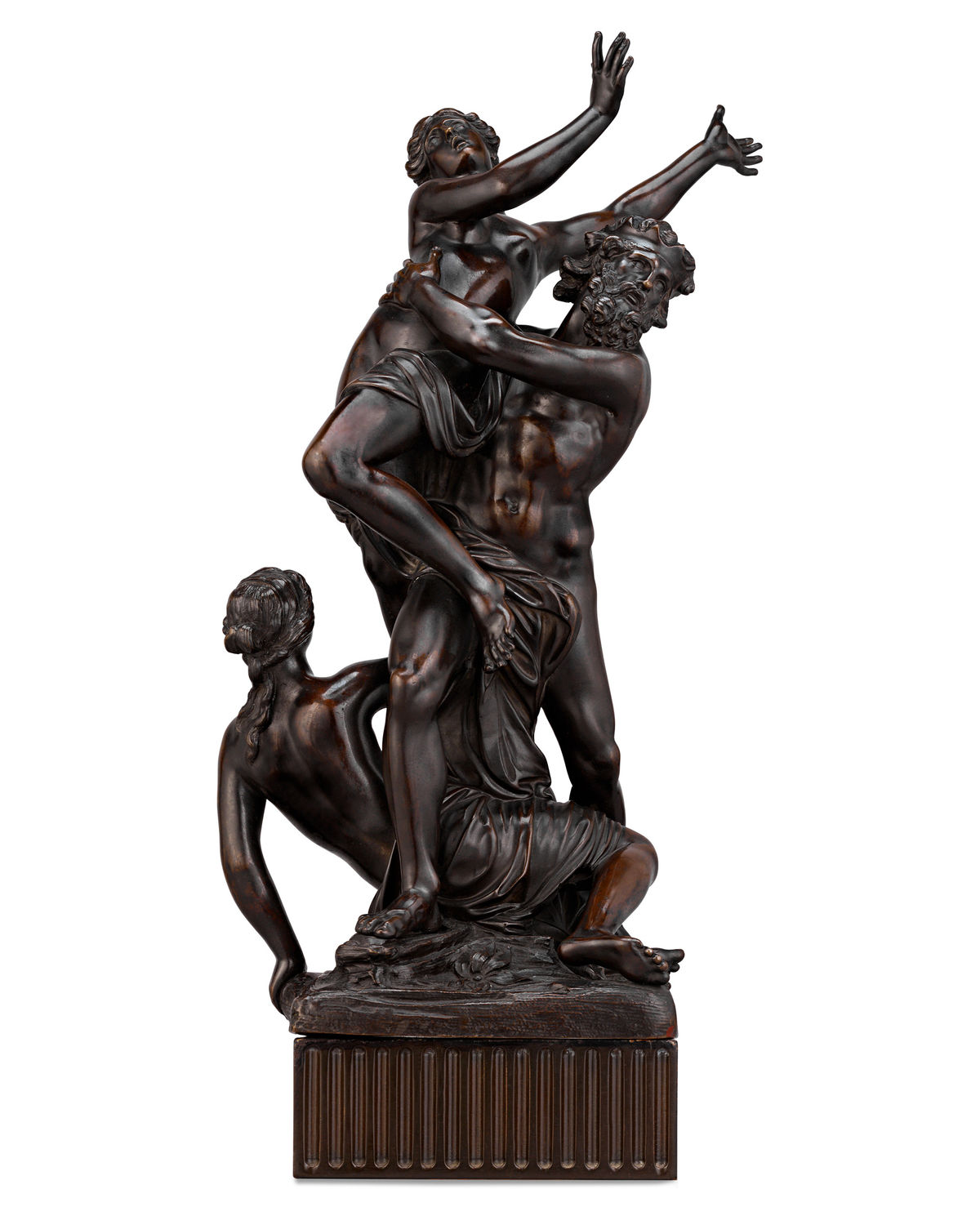
Pluto Abducting Proserpine after François Girardon. Bronze. Circa 1700.

== Bibliography ==
- Geese, Uwe (2015). "Baroque sculpture". In Rolf Toman (ed.). L'art baroque architecture, sculpture, peinture (in French). Cologne: H.F. Ullmann. ISBN 978-3-8480-0856-8.
- Chisholm, Hugh, ed. (1911). "Girardon, François" . Encyclopædia Britannica. Vol. 12 (11th ed.). Cambridge University Press. p. 46.
