= Place Vendôme =

Square in Paris

Coordinates: 48°52′03″N 2°19′46″E

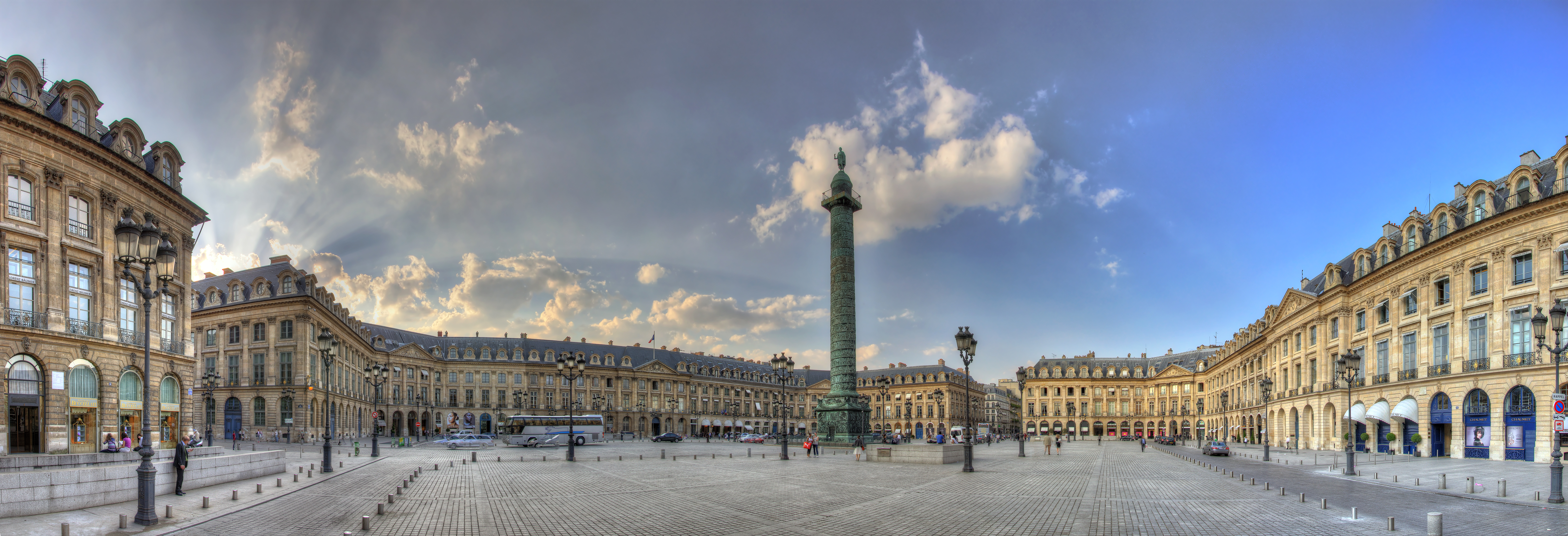
Place Vendôme, Paris

The Place Vendôme (French: [plas vɑ̃dom]; lit. 'Vendôme Square'), originally the Place Louis-le-Grand ('Louis the Great Square'), and later the Place Internationale ('International Square'), is a public square in the 1st arrondissement of Paris, located to the north of the Tuileries Gardens and east of the Église de la Madeleine. It is the starting point of the Rue de la Paix. Its regular architecture by Jules Hardouin-Mansart and pedimented screens canted across the corners give the rectangular Place Vendôme the aspect of an octagon. The original Vendôme Column at the centre of the square was erected by Napoleon I to commemorate the Battle of Austerlitz; it was torn down on 16 May 1871, by decree of the Paris Commune, but subsequently re-erected and remains a prominent feature on the square today.

== History ==
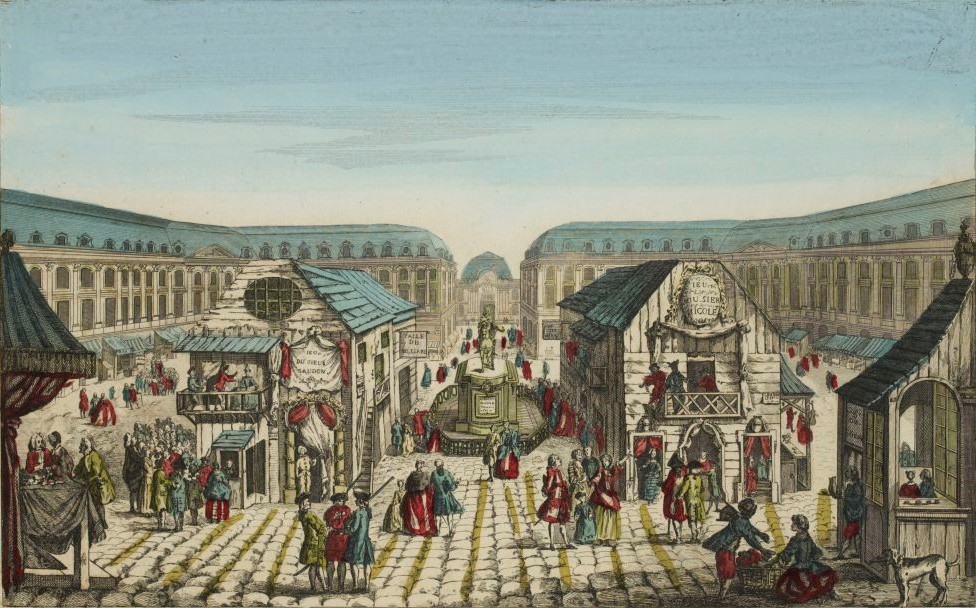
The Foire Saint-Ovide around 1770 by Jacques-Gabriel Huquier, Musée de la Révolution française

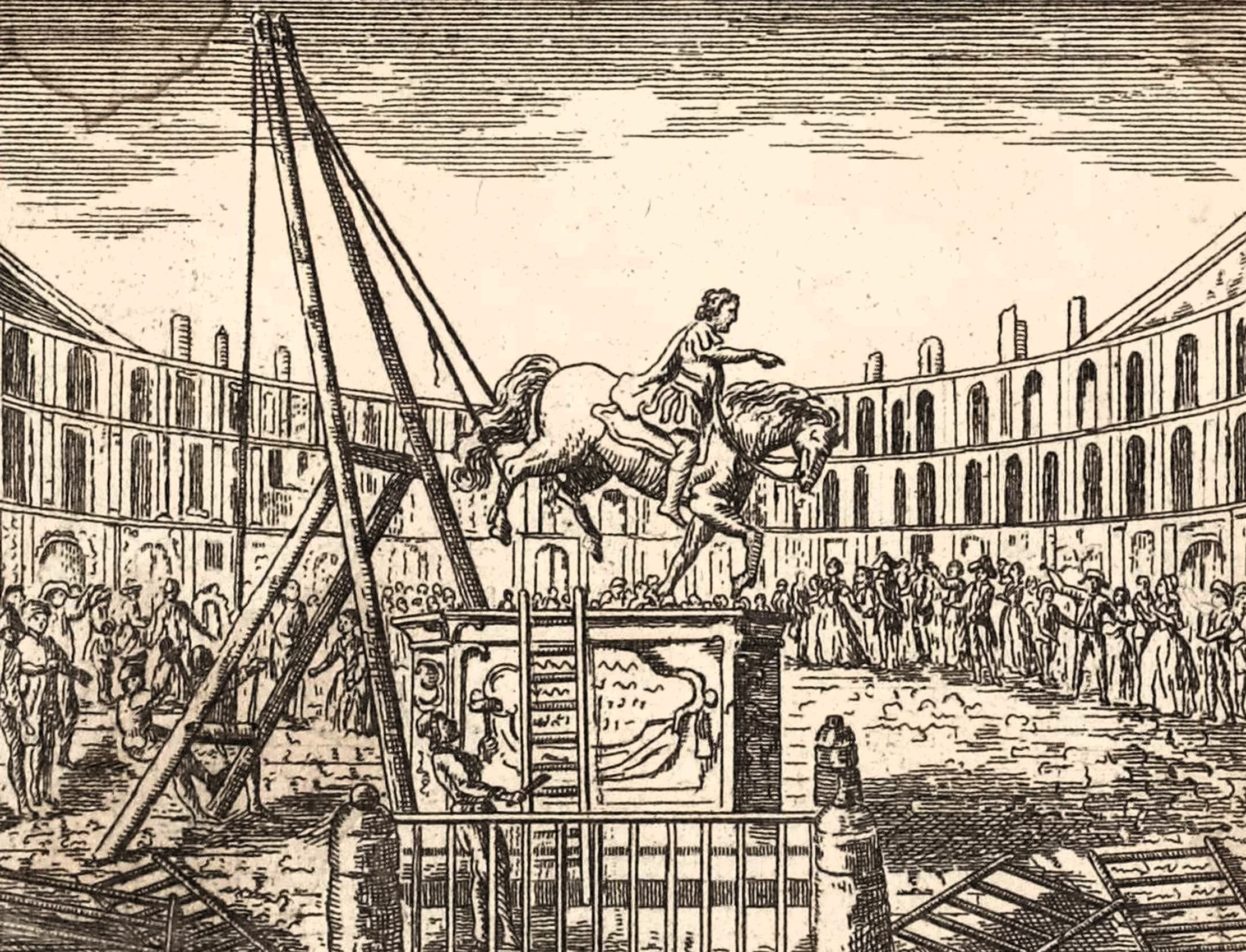
Destruction by the Revolutionaries of the equestrian statue of Louis XIV August 10, 1792

The Place Vendôme was begun in 1698 as a monument to the glory of the armies of Louis XIV, and called the Place des Conquêtes, to be renamed the Place Louis le Grand, when the conquests proved temporary. An over life-size equestrian statue of the king by François Girardon (1699) was donated by the city authorities and set up in its centre. It is believed to be the first large modern equestrian statue to be cast in a single piece. It was destroyed in the French Revolution; however, there is a small version in the Louvre. This led to the popular joke that while Henry IV dwelled among the people by the Pont Neuf, and Louis XIII among the aristocrats of the Place des Vosges, Louis XIV preferred the company of the tax farmers in the Place Vendôme; each reflecting the group they had favoured in life.

The site of the square was formerly the hôtel of César de Bourbon, Duke of Vendôme, the illegitimate son of Henry IV and his mistress Gabrielle d'Estrées. Jules Hardouin-Mansart bought the building and its gardens, with the idea of converting it into building lots as a profitable speculation. The plan did not materialize, and Louis XIV's Minister of Finance, François-Michel le Tellier, Marquis de Louvois, purchased the piece of ground, with the object of building a square, modelled on the successful Place des Vosges of the previous century. Louvois came into financial difficulties and nothing came of his project, either. After his death, the King purchased the plot and commissioned Hardouin-Mansart to design a house-front that the buyers of plots round the square would agree to adhere to. When the state finances ran low, the financier John Law took on the project, built himself a residence behind one of the façades, and the square was complete by 1720, just as his paper-money Mississippi bubble burst. Law suffered a major blow when he was forced to pay back taxes amounting to some tens of millions of dollars. With no way to pay such an amount, he was forced to sell the property he owned on the square. The buyers were members of the exiled Condé branch of the House of Bourbon who later returned to the country to reclaim their land in the town of Vendôme itself. Between 1720 and 1797, they acquired much of the square, including a freehold to parts of the site on which the Hôtel Ritz Paris now stands and in which they still maintain apartments. Their intention to restore a family palace on the site was dependent on the possible intentions of the adjacent Justice Ministry to expand its premises.

The Foire Saint-Ovide settled in 1764 on the Place until 1771.

When France established diplomatic relations with the short-lived Republic of Texas, the Texan legation was housed at Hôtel Bataille de Francès in 1 Place Vendôme.

Two bird's-eye views of the Place Louis-le-Grand in 1705

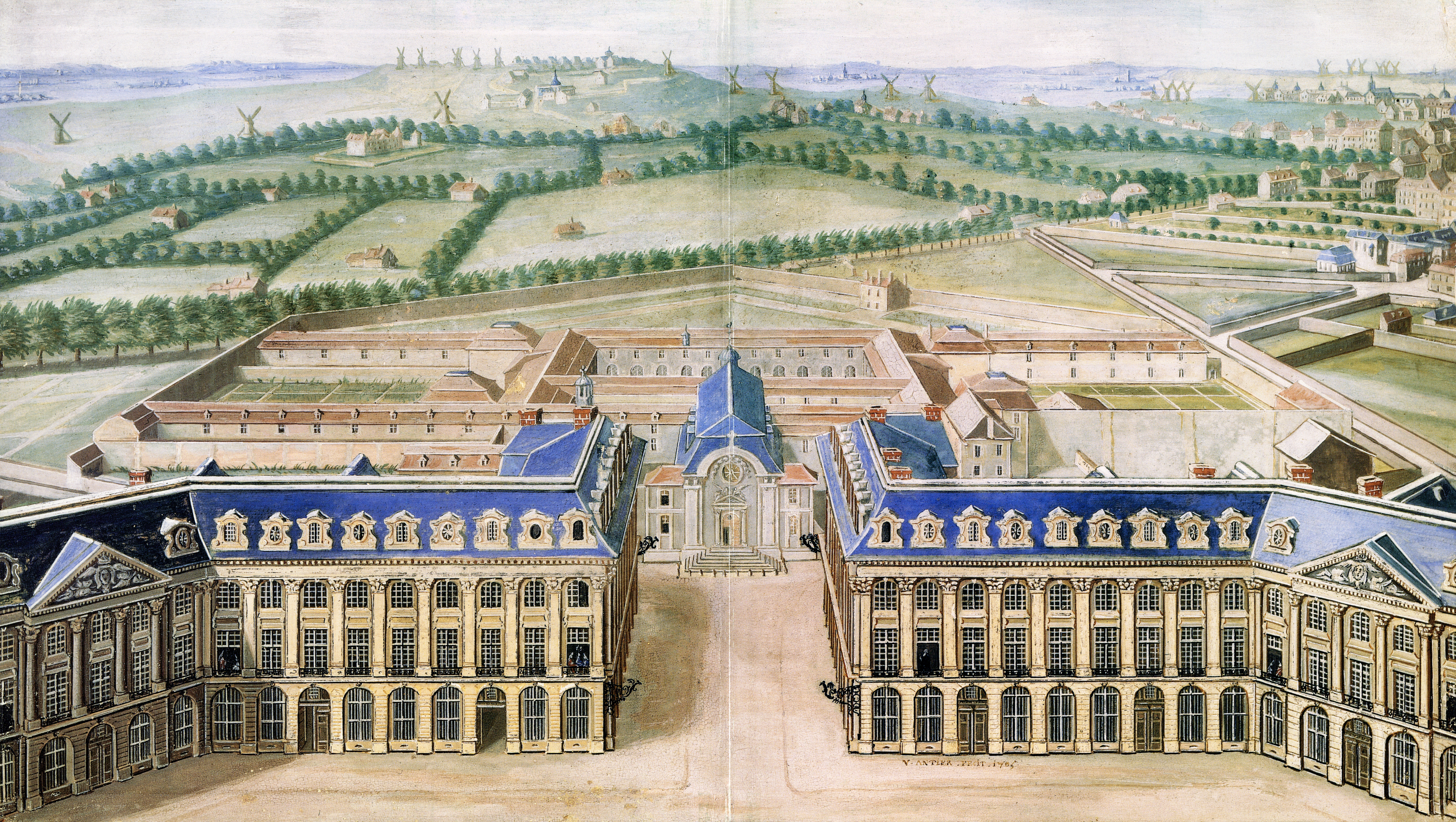
View to the north with the Couvent des Capucines in the background and Montmartre in the distance

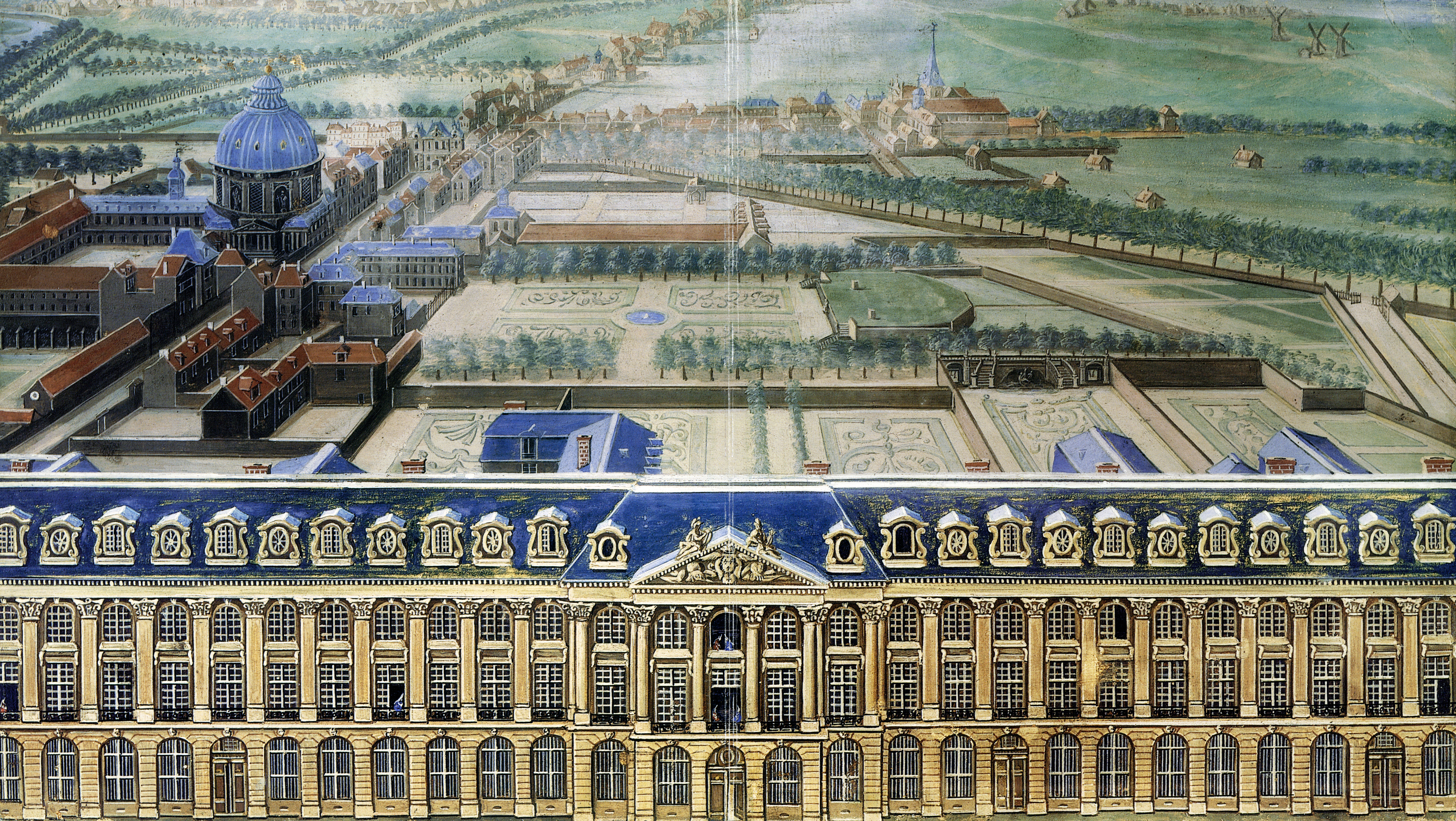
View to the west with the domed Church of the Daughters of the Assumption visible on the south side of the Rue Saint-Honoré

== The Vendôme Column ==
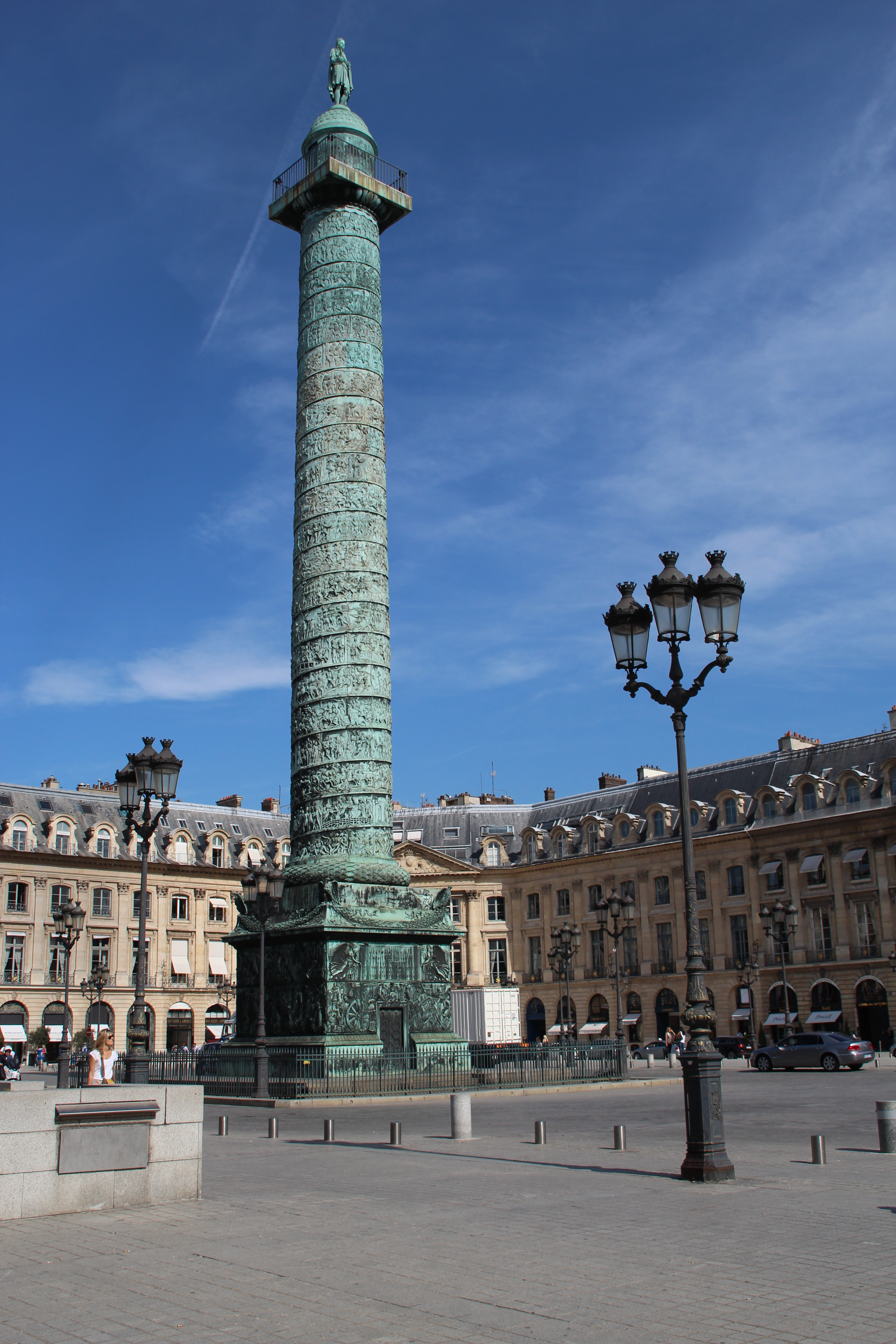
The Vendôme Column

=== Creation ===
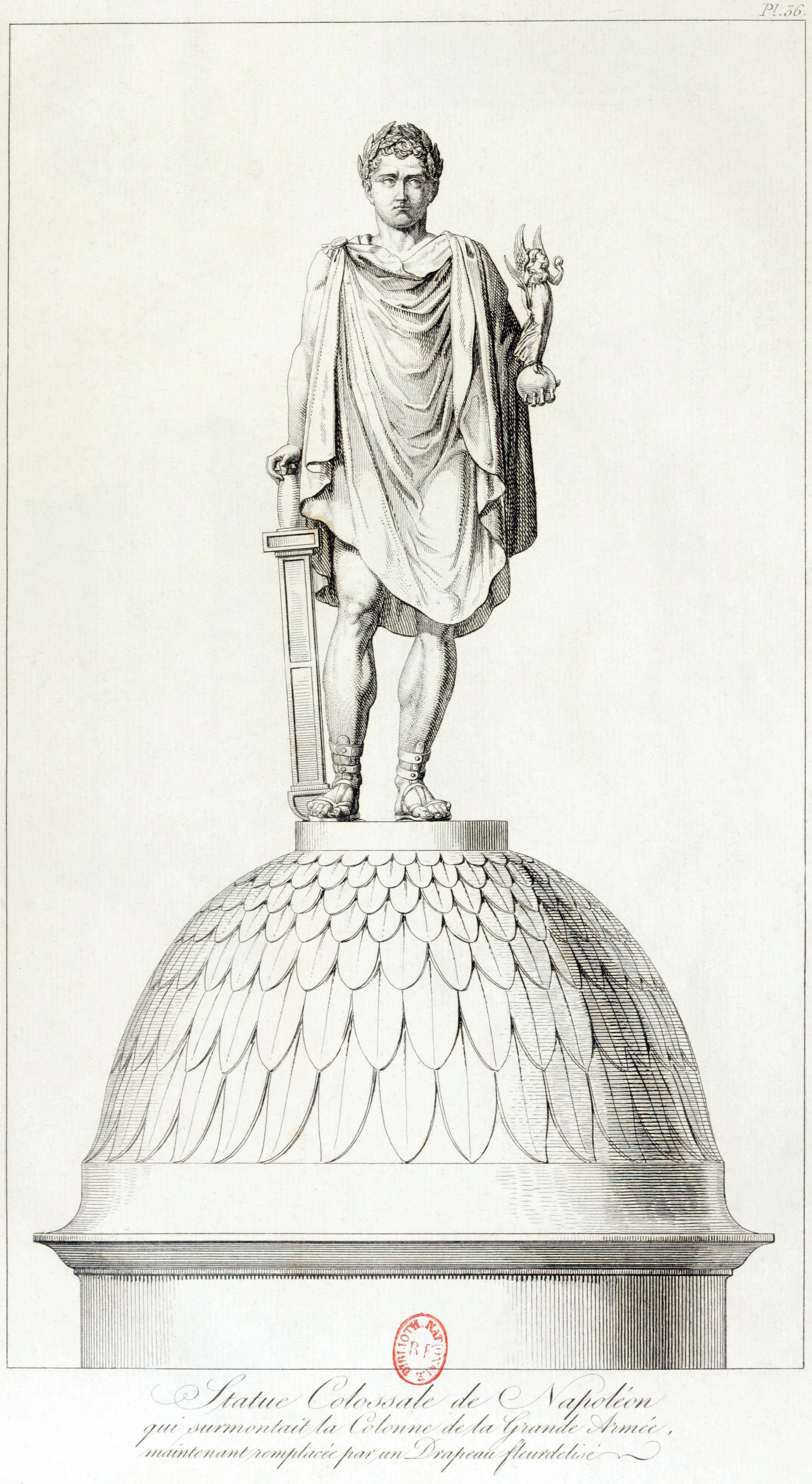
Statue of Napoleon by Antoine-Denis Chaudet

The original column was started in 1806 at Napoleon's direction and completed in 1810. It was modelled after Trajan's Column, to celebrate the victory of Austerlitz; its veneer of 425 spiralling bas-relief bronze plates was made out of cannon taken from the combined armies of Europe, according to his propaganda. (The usual figure given is hugely exaggerated: 180 cannons were actually captured at Austerlitz.) These plates were designed by the sculptor Pierre-Nolasque Bergeret and executed by a team of about 30 sculptors including Jean-Joseph Foucou, Louis-Simon Boizot, François Joseph Bosio, Lorenzo Bartolini, Claude Ramey, François Rude, Corbet, Clodion, Julie Charpentier, and Henri-Joseph Ruxthiel. A statue of Napoleon by Antoine-Denis Chaudet was placed on top of the column. Napoleon is depicted dressed in Roman attire, bare-headed, crowned with laurels, holding a sword in his right hand and a globe surmounted with a statue of Victory (as in Napoleon as Mars the Peacemaker) in his left hand.

In 1816, taking advantage of the Allied occupying force, a mob of men and horses had attached a cable to the neck of the statue of Napoleon atop the column, but it had refused to budge – one woman quipped: "If the Emperor is as solid on his throne as this statue is on its column, he's nowhere near descending the throne". After the Bourbon Restoration the statue, though not the column, was pulled down and melted down to provide the bronze for the recast equestrian statue of Henry IV on the Pont Neuf (as was bronze from sculptures on the Column of the Grande Armée at Boulogne-sur-Mer), though the statuette of Victory is still to be seen in the salon Napoléon of the Hôtel des Monnaies (which also contains a model of the column and a likeness of Napoleon's face copied from his death mask). A replacement statue of Napoléon in modern dress (a bicorn hat, boots and a redingote), however, was erected by Louis-Philippe, and a better, more augustly classicizing one by Louis-Napoléon (later Napoleon III).

=== Demolition during the Paris Commune ===
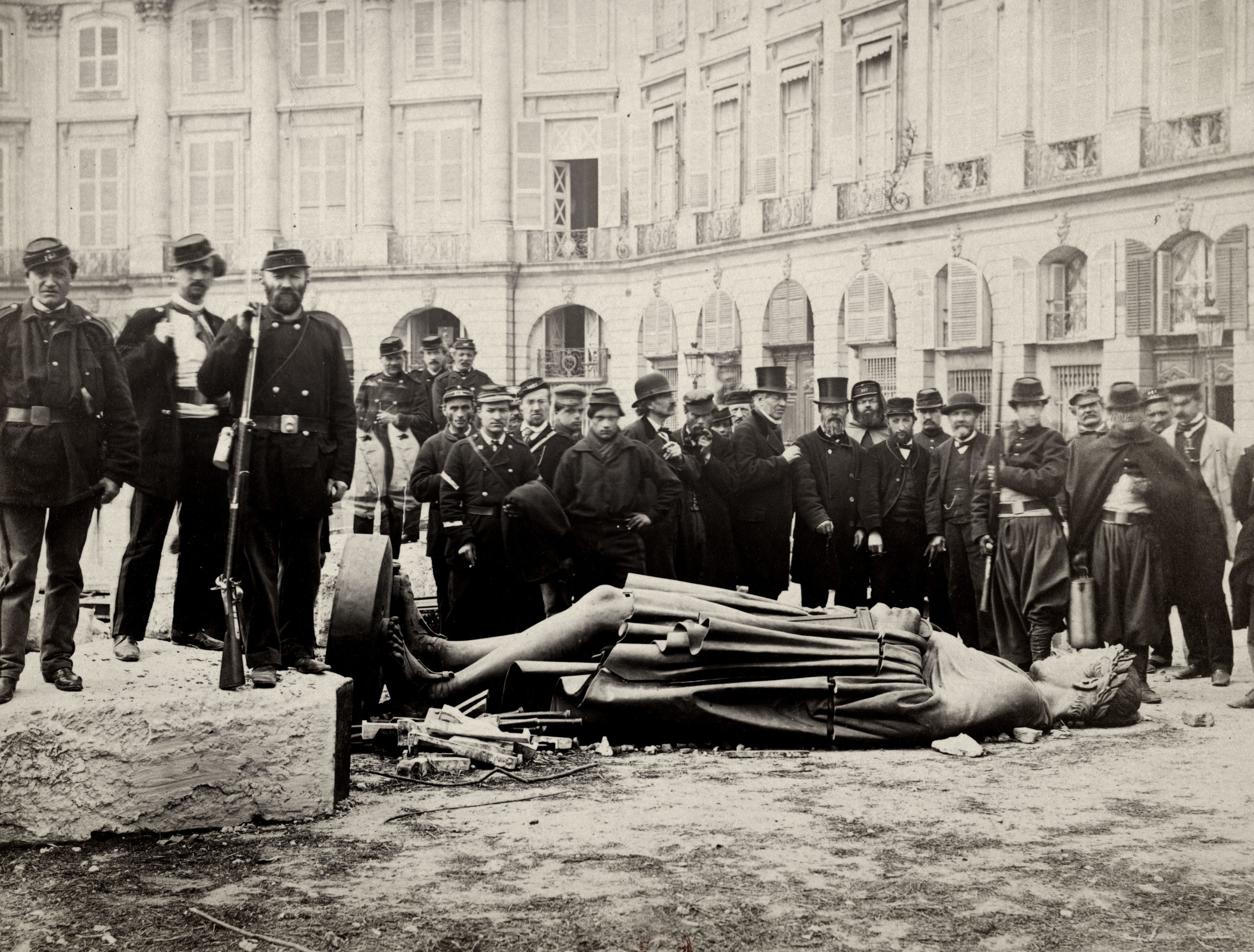
Communards pose with the statue of Napoléon I from the toppled Vendôme Column, 1871

Karl Marx predicted the collapse of the Vendôme Column in his 1852 political pamphlet Le 18 Brumaire de Louis Bonaparte. This pamphlet, sharply critical of the political figure of Napoleon III, ends with the words: "But if the Imperial mantle finally falls on the shoulders of Louis Bonaparte, the bronze statue of Napoleon will fall from the height of the Vendôme Column".

During the events in the run-up to the founding of the Commune, 22 March 1871 saw disturbances outside against the National Guard, when demonstrators holding banners declaring them to be "Friends of Peace" were blocked from entering the Place Vendôme by guardsmen who, after being fired on, opened fire on the crowd. At least 12 people were killed and many wounded.

During the Paris Commune in 1871, the painter Gustave Courbet, president of the Federation of Artists and elected member of the Commune, who had previously expressed his dismay that this monument to war was located on the Rue de la Paix, proposed that the column be disassembled and preserved at the Hôtel des Invalides. Courbet argued that:

In as much as the Vendôme Column is a monument devoid of all artistic value, tending to perpetuate by its expression the ideas of war and conquest of the past imperial dynasty, which are reproved by a republican nation's sentiment, citizen Courbet expresses the wish that the National Defense government will authorise him to disassemble this column.

His project as proposed was not adopted, though on 12 April 1871 legislation was passed authorizing the dismantling of the imperial symbol. When the column was taken down on 16 May its bronze plates were preserved. After employing a series of ropes and quarry workers, observers saw that the statue...

...fell over on the heap of sand prepared for it, with a mighty crash. There was no concussion on the ground, the column broke up almost before it reached its bed, and lay on the ground, a huge mass of ruin. An immense dust and smoke from the stones and crumpled clay rose up and an instant after a crowd of men, National Guards, Communards, and a sight-seeing Englishman flew upon it, and commenced to get bits of it as remembrance, but the excitement was so intense that people moved about as in a dream.

Immediately following the destruction of the column and in repudiation of its perceived glorification of national chauvinism and bellicosity, the Place Vendôme was renamed the Place Internationale in celebration of the Communards' promotion of international fraternity.

Demolition of the Vendôme Column in 1871

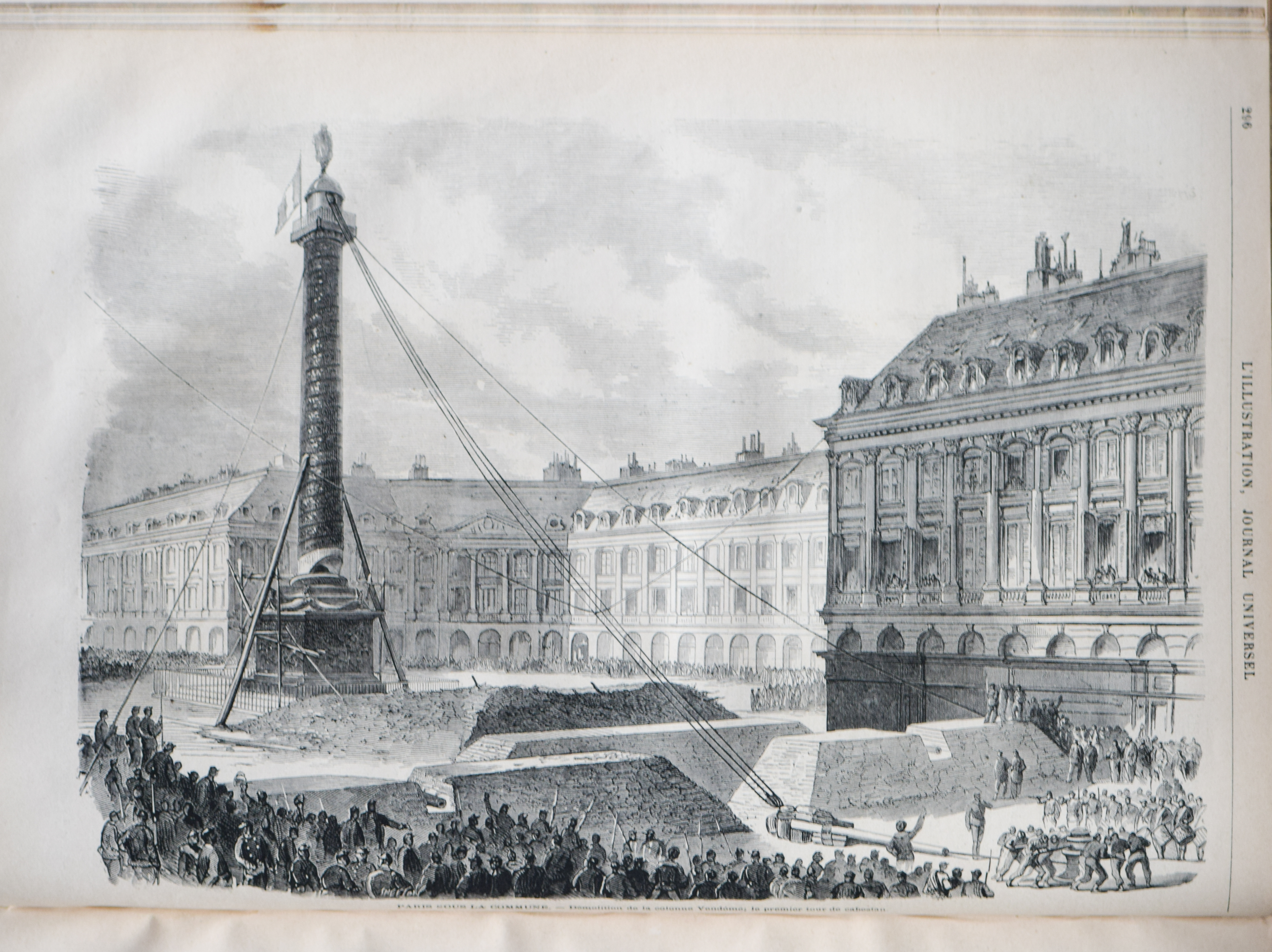
The Paris Commune prepares to pull down the Vendôme Column

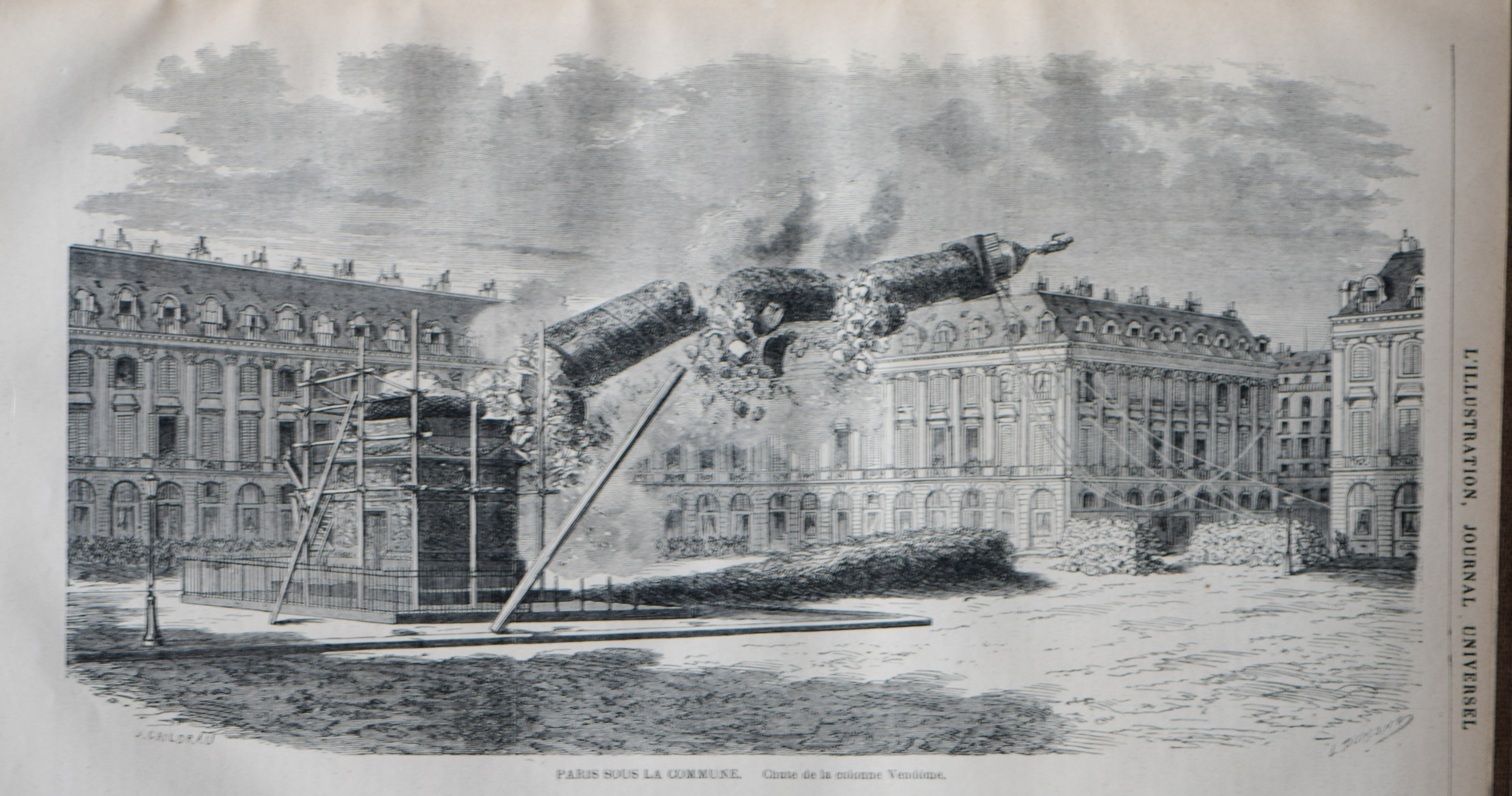
Destruction of the Vendôme Column

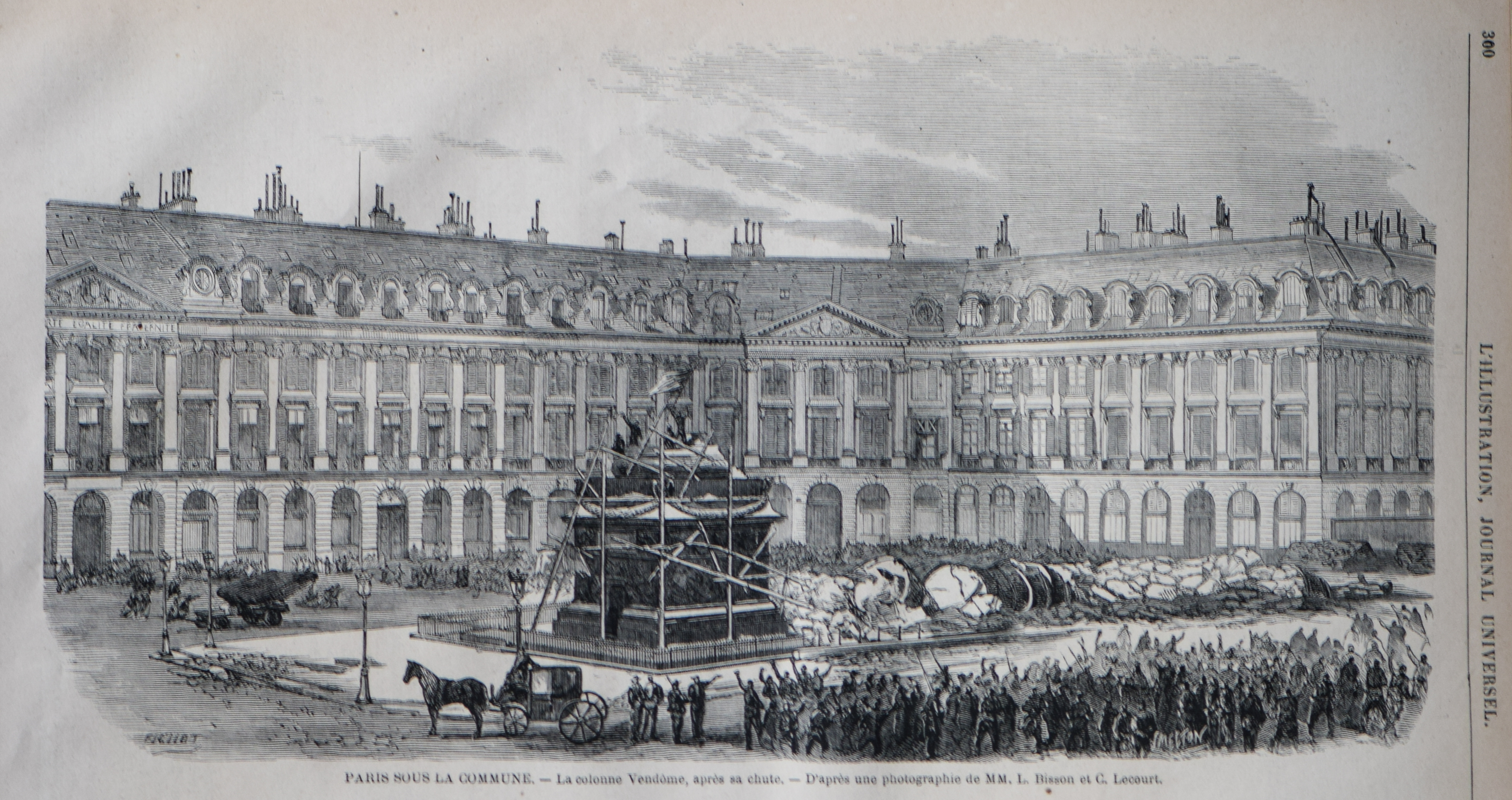
Aftermath of the destruction of the Vendôme Column

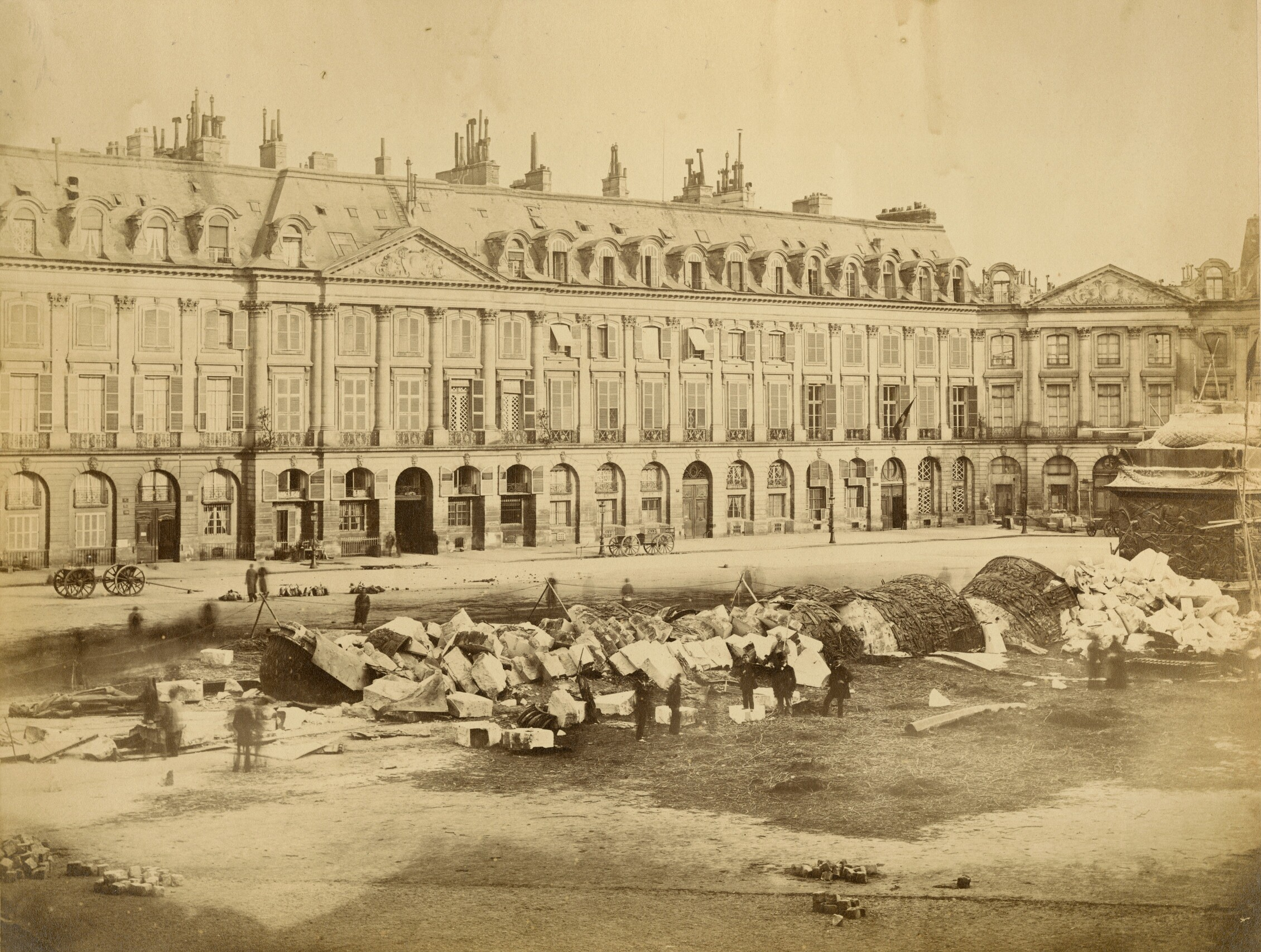
Toppled Vendôme Column by Alphonse Liebert

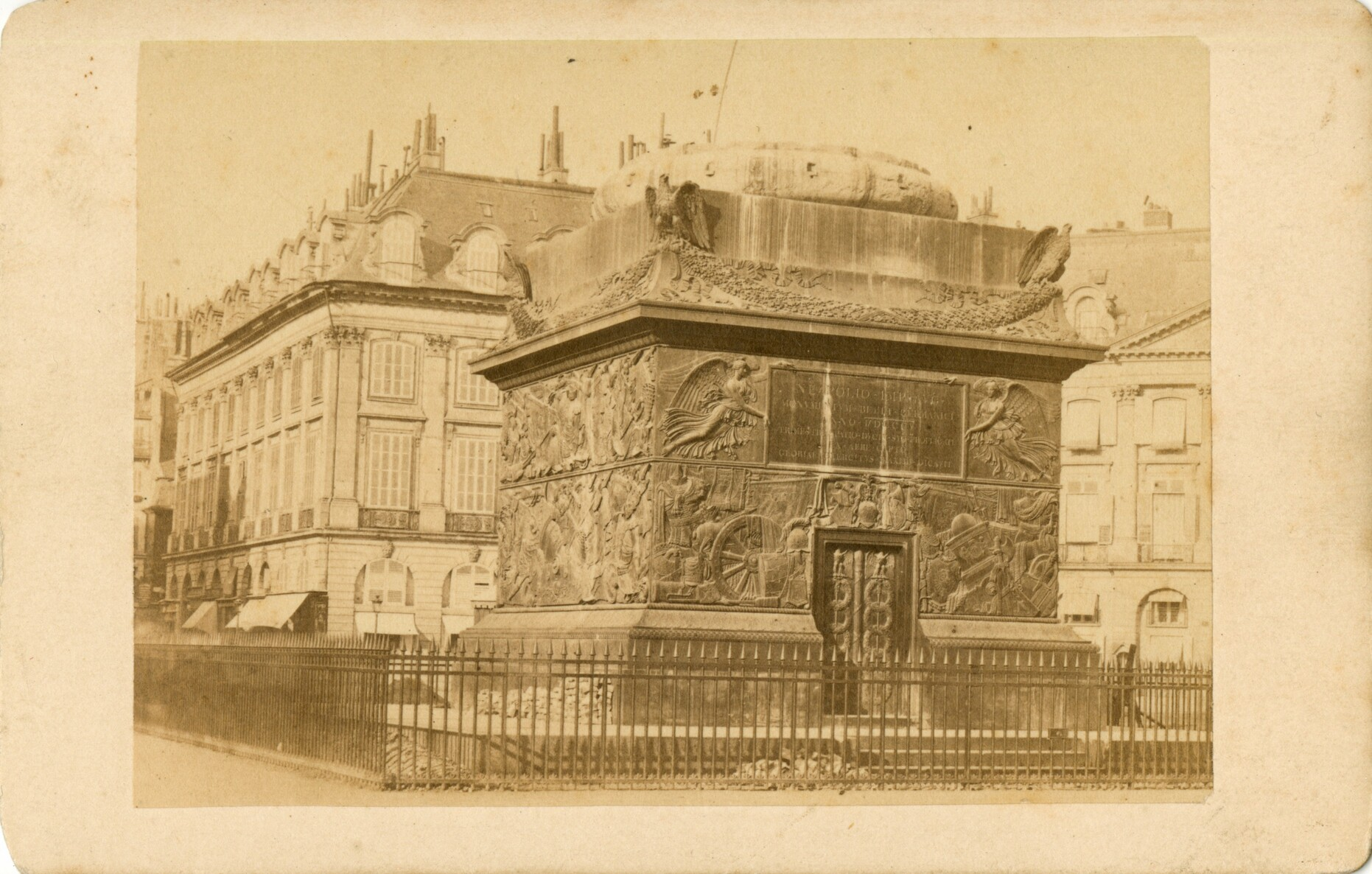
Base of the Vendôme Column after destruction

=== After the Paris Commune ===
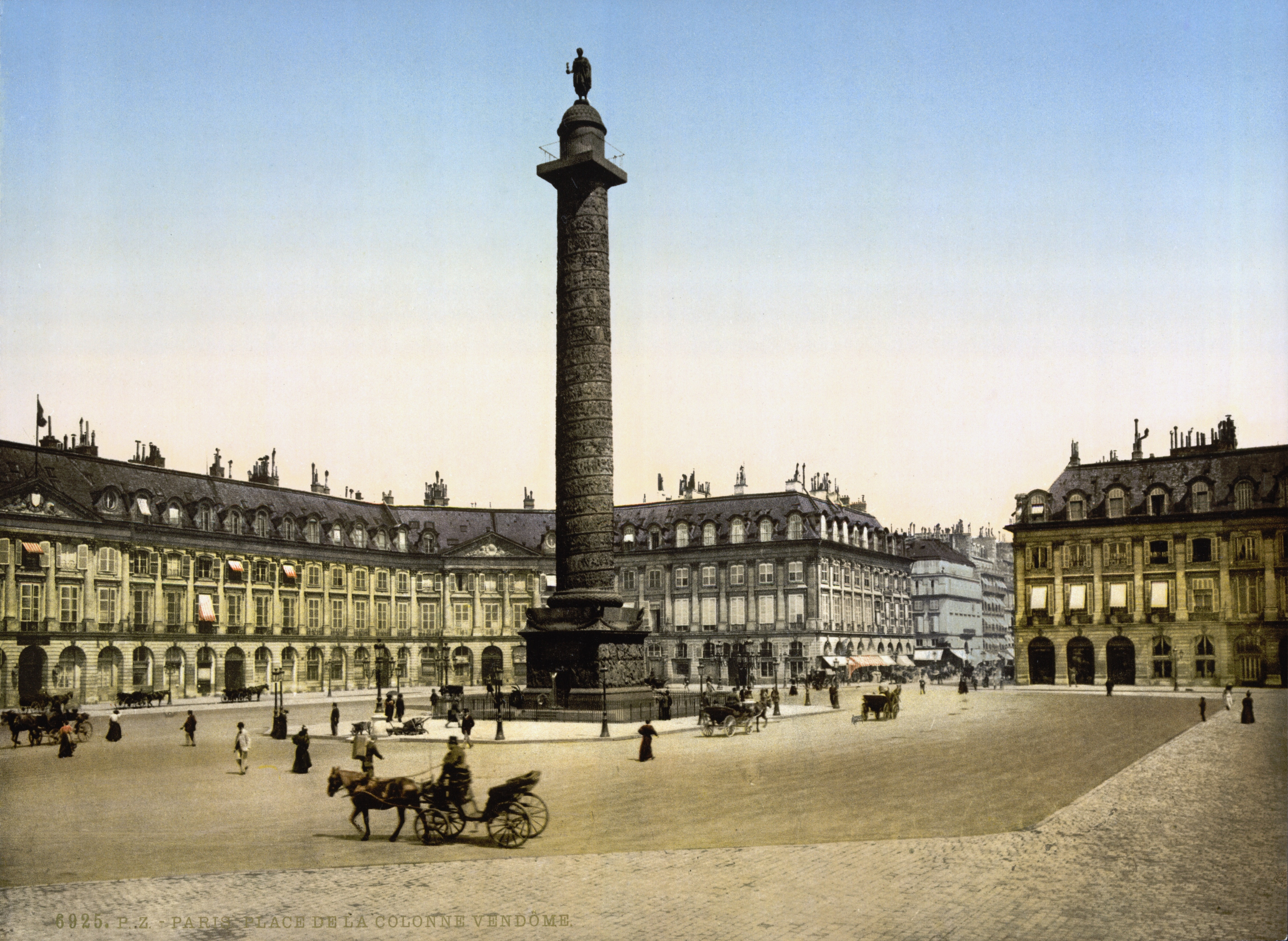
The Place Vendôme, circa 1900

After the suppression of the Paris Commune by Adolphe Thiers, the decision was made to rebuild the column with the statue of Napoleon restored at its apex. For his role in the Commune, Courbet was condemned to pay the costs of rebuilding the monument, estimated at 323,000 francs, in yearly installments of 10,000 francs. Unable to pay, Courbet went into self-imposed exile in Switzerland, the French government seized and sold the artist's paintings for a minor amount, and Courbet died in exile in December 1877. In 1874 meanwhile, the column was re-erected at the center of the Place Vendôme with a copy of the original statue on top. An inner staircase leading to the top is no longer open to the public.

== Features ==
At the centre of the square's long sides, Hardouin-Mansart's range of Corinthian pilasters breaks forward under a pediment, to create palace-like fronts. The arcading of the formally rusticated ground floors does not provide an arcaded passageway as at the Place des Vosges. The architectural linking of the windows from one floor to the next, and the increasing arch of their windowheads, provide an upward spring to the horizontals formed by ranks of windows. Originally the square was accessible by a single street and preserved an aristocratic quiet, except when the annual fair was held there. Then Napoleon opened the Rue de la Paix, and the 19th century filled the Place Vendôme with traffic. It was only after the opening in 1875 of the Palais Garnier on the other side of the Rue de la Paix that the centre of the Parisian fashionable life started gravitating around the Rue de la Paix and the Place Vendôme.

== Hôtels particuliers ==
Hôtels particuliers on the Place Vendôme:

- N°1 : Hôtel Batailhe de Francès
- N°3 : Hôtel de Coëtlogon
- N°5 : Hôtel d'Orsigny
- N°7 : Hôtel Le Bas de Montargis
- N°9 : Hôtel de Villemaré
- N°11 : Hôtel de Simiane
- N°13 : Hôtel de Bourvallais
- N°15 : Hôtel de Gramont
- N°17 : Hôtel de Crozat
- N°19 : Hôtel d'Évreux
- N°21 : Hôtel de Fontpertuis
- N°23 : Hôtel de Boullongne
- N°25 : Hôtel Peyrenc de Moras
- N°2 : Hôtel Marquet de Bourgade
- N°4 : Hôtel Heuzé de Vologer
- N°6 : Hôtel Thibert des Martrais
- N°8 : Hôtel Delpech de Chaumot
- N°10 : Hôtel de Latour-Maubourg
- N°12 : Hôtel Baudard de Saint-James
- N°14 : Hôtel de La Fare
- N°16 : Hôtel Moufle
- N°18 : Hôtel Duché des Tournelles
- N°20 : Hôtel de Parabère
- N°22 : Hôtel de Ségur
- N°24 : Hôtel de Boffrand
- N°26 : Hôtel de Noce
- N°28 : Hôtel Gaillard de la Bouëxière

== In popular culture ==
The Place Vendôme has been renowned for its fashionable and deluxe hotels such as the Ritz. Many famous dress designers have had their salons in the square. The only two remaining are the shirtmaker Charvet, at number 28, whose store has been on the Place Vendôme since 1877, and the couturier Chéruit, at number 21, reestablished in 2008. Since 1718, the Ministry of Justice, also known as the "Chancellerie", is located at the Hotel de Bourvallais located at numbers 11 and 13. Right on the other side of the Place Vendôme, number 14 houses the Paris office of JP Morgan, the investment bank, and number 20 the office of Ardian (formerly AXA Private Equity).

After his death in 1990, American artist Keith Haring was cremated and his ashes were sprinkled out on a hillside near Kutztown, except for one handful, that Yoko Ono brought to the Place Vendôme because she believed the spirit of Haring had told her to.

The Place Vendôme is described in detail in the 1924 novel The Green Hat by Michael Arlen.

In the 1920s, American architect, Alonzo C. Webb worked making advertisements and designs in English for some of the fashionable houses along the Place Vendôme.

Place Vendôme was a 1998 movie by Nicole Garcia starring Catherine Deneuve.

Mark Twain made reference to the Vendôme Column in his speech "Some Thoughts on the Science of Onanism".

The Place Vendôme is the setting for the theft of the Black Pearl in Episode 1 of Season 3 of the Netflix series Lupin.

The Modern Jazz Quartet has composed a song called "Vendome" and published an album with The Swingle Singers with the name "Place Vendôme"

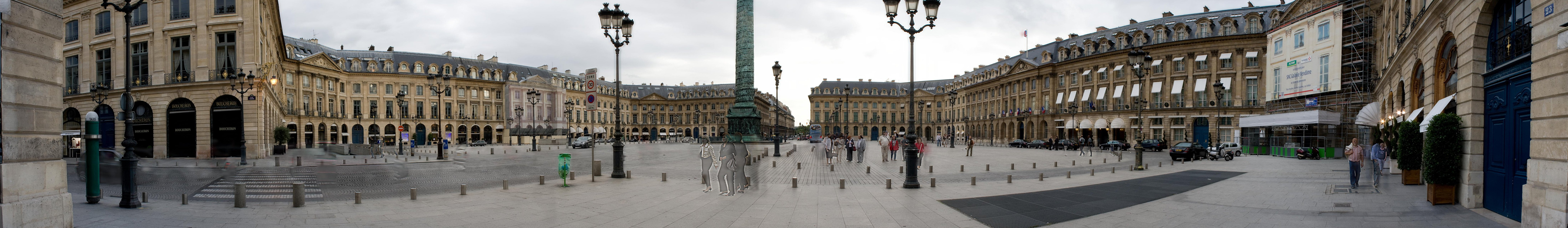
Panoramic view of the Place Vendôme

== Notable residents ==
- Claude Dupin, (1686–1769), the financier and contracted tax-collector (fermier-général), at 10, Place Vendôme.
- Augustin Blondel de Gagny (1695–1776).
- Abel-François Poisson, marquis de Marigny, (1727–1781), the brother of Madame de Pompadour, at 8, Place Vendôme.
- Franz Mesmer, (1734–1815), the German physician and discoverer of animal magnetism, at 16, Place Vendôme.
- Anne Lister (1791–1840), the English landowner and diarist, stayed at 24, Place Vendôme, a guesthouse run by M. and Mme de Boyve in 1824–25. This is where she met and carried on an affair with Maria Barlow.
- Frédéric Chopin, (1810–1849), the Polish composer, at 12, Place Vendôme, where he died.
- Virginia Oldoini, Countess di Castiglione (1837–1899), the former mistress of Napoleon III, lived in seclusion from the 1870s until the 1890s at 26, Place Vendôme, above Boucheron.
- Samuel Jean de Pozzi, (1846–1918), the surgeon and gynaecologist, at 10, Place Vendôme.
- Coco Chanel, (1883–1971), the fashion designer, at 15, Place Vendôme, (the Hôtel Ritz Paris).
- Prince Jefri Bolkiah, at 3–5, Place Vendôme.

== Metro station ==
The Place Vendôme is:

Located near the Metro stations: Opéra, Pyramides, Madeleine and Tuileries.

It is served by lines.

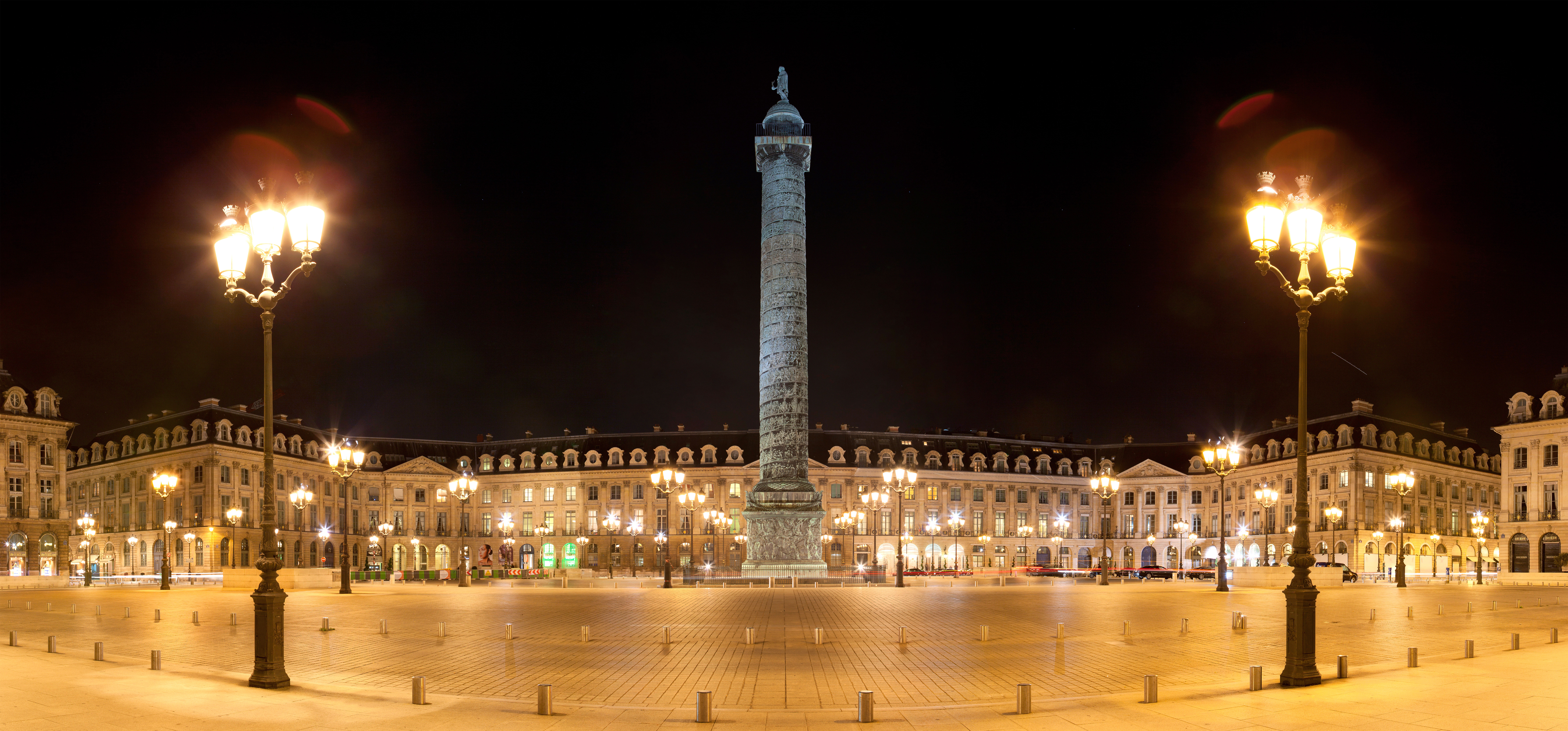
The Place Vendôme by night

== See also ==
- List of tourist attractions in Paris
