= France–Republic of Texas relations =

France-Republic of Texas relations
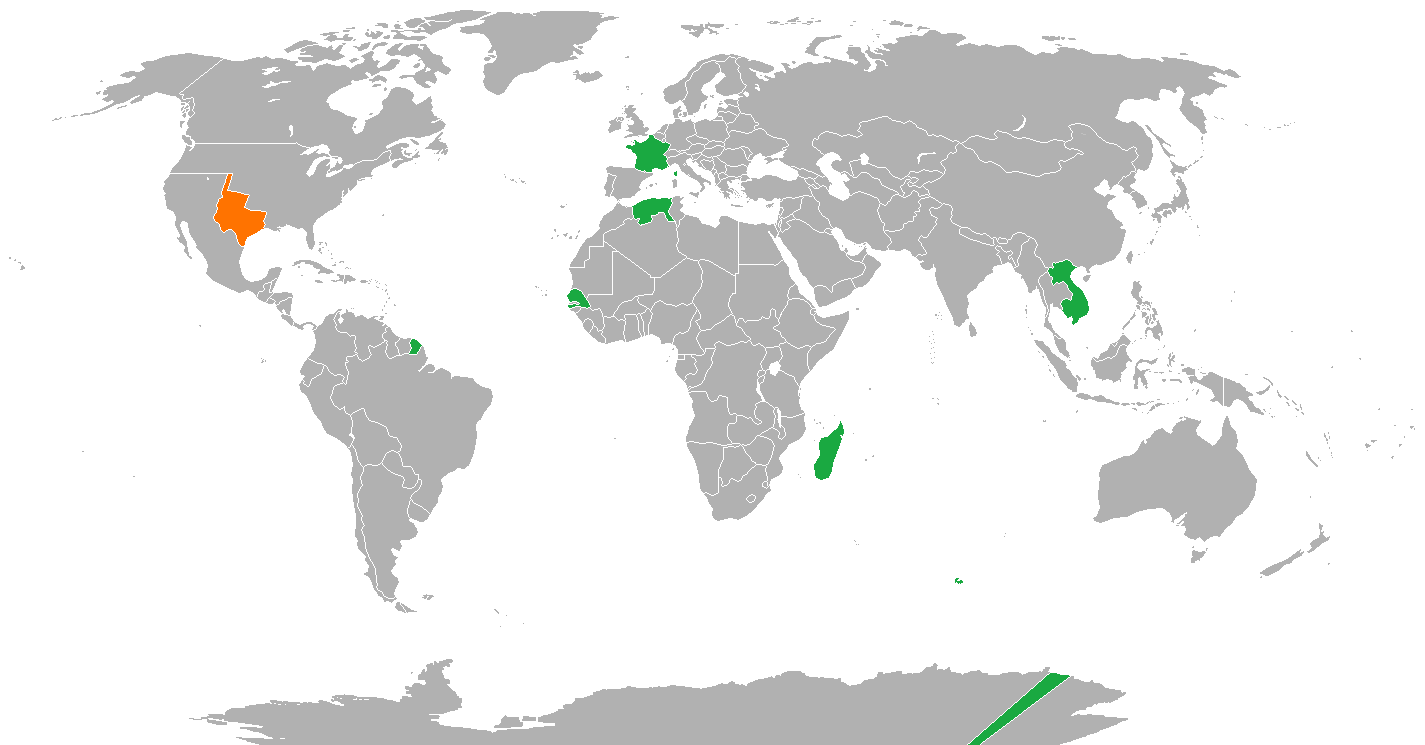
- France: Texas

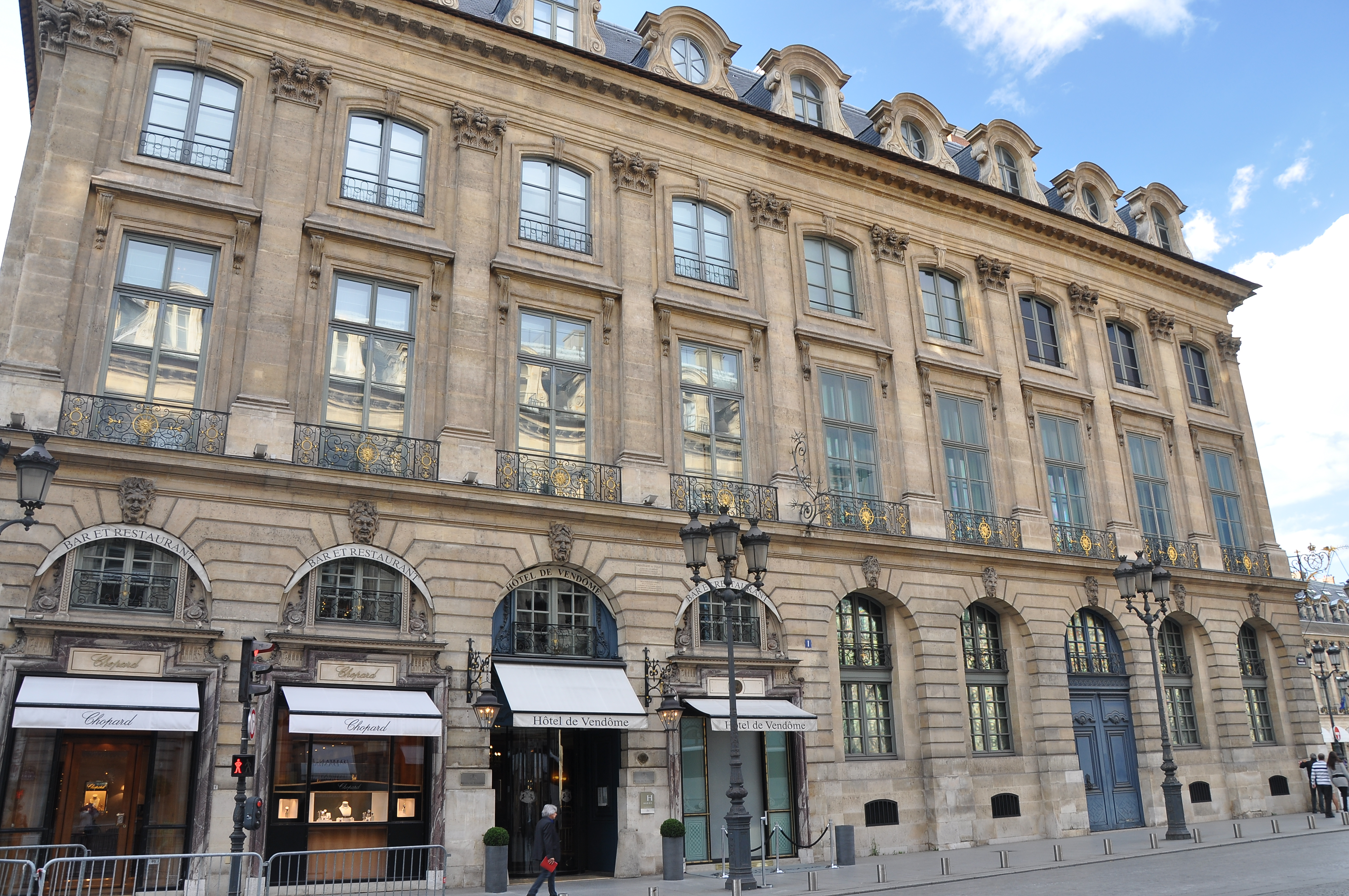
The Hôtel Bataille de Francès, place Vendôme in Paris, housed the Embassy of the Republic of Texas

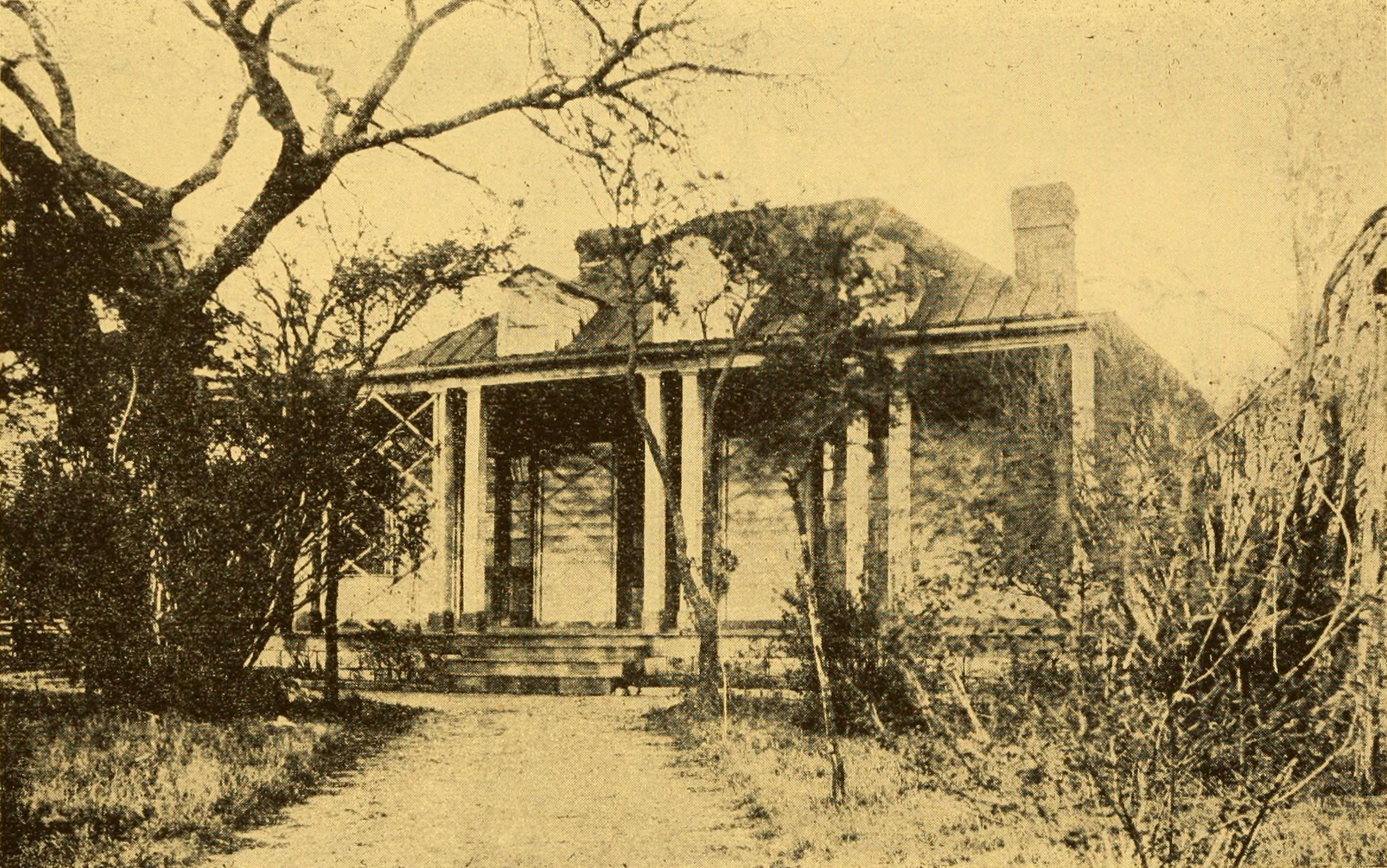
Mansion in Texas that housed the French Embassy of the Republic of Texas

France – Republic of Texas relations refers to the historical foreign relations between the Republic of Texas and France. Relations began in September 1839 when France appointed Alponse Dubois de Saligny to serve as chargé d'affaires. Relations officially ceased upon annexation of Texas by the United States in 1845.

== French recognition of Texan independence ==
Following Texas' separation from Mexico, the major European powers were reluctant to take any steps toward recognizing the self-proclaimed Republic until it became clear that it could survive in the long-term and what international ramifications formal recognition might produce. France was one of the few nations to grant semi-official recognition of Texas on September 25, 1839. In 1841 the French opened a legation which still stands in Austin, (a few miles from the site of the current Texas Capitol building), and Texas in turn opened an embassy in Paris. France had wanted to set up a consulate general in Washington-on-the-Brazos and a consulate in Houston as well.

== Trade ==
Texas exported cotton, which by the 19th century was fast becoming a vital commodity in Europe and an increasing cause of tension between France and the UK, and other raw materials to France, while France exported iron, machinery and finished goods to Texas. Both the French and Texian navies patrolled the Gulf of Mexico, although, while the French Navy was never at war with the Mexican Navy, the Texian navy often was. French ships began making less frequent visits to Mexican Ports, and increased trade with Texas.

== See also ==
- French Texas, 1684–1689
- Texas Revolution
