= Bullock Texas State History Museum =

Museum in Austin, Texas

Bob Bullock Texas State History Museum

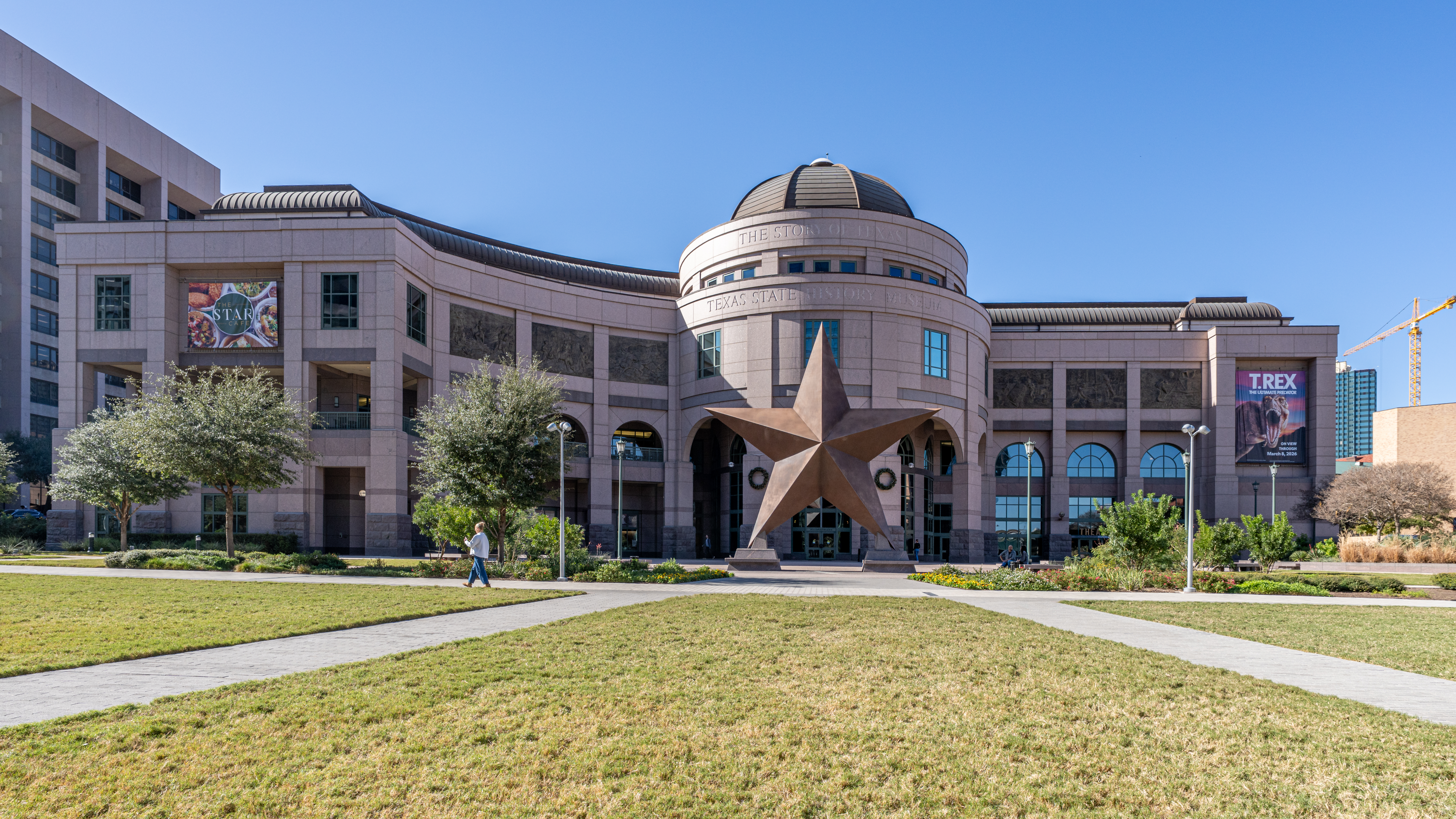

- Location within Texas
- Established: 2001
- Location: 1800 N. Congress Avenue; Austin, Texas
- Coordinates: 30.2802°N 97.7388°W
- Type: History museum
- Owner: Texas State Preservation Board
- Website: Official web site

The Bullock Texas State History Museum (often referred to as the Bob Bullock Texas State History Museum or Bullock Museum) is a history museum in Austin, Texas. The museum, located a few blocks north of the Texas State Capitol at 1800 North Congress Avenue in Austin, Texas, is dedicated to interpreting the continually unfolding "Story of Texas" to the broadest possible audience through meaningful educational experiences. The museum is operated by the Texas State Preservation Board, which also operates the Texas State Capitol, the Texas Capitol Visitors Center, the Texas Governor's Mansion, and the Texas State Cemetery.

== History ==
The Bullock Texas State History Museum is named after the 38th Lieutenant Governor of Texas Bob Bullock, who championed the preservation and exhibition of Texas history and worked to establish its creation. Bullock was the guest of honor at the groundbreaking ceremony for the museum in April 1999 and died the following June before the museum was completed. The museum held its grand opening celebration on April 28, 2001.

== Exhibitions ==
In 2018, the Bullock Museum unveiled its newly renovated long-term first floor Texas History Gallery titled Becoming Texas. The exhibition explores more than 16,000 years of Texas history beginning with one of the earliest known objects created by humans in the Americas, a projectile point discovered at the Gault archaeological site 40 miles (64 km) north of Austin. The exhibition also examines the early American Indian civilizations that cultivated the area prior to European arrival, European ambitions to colonize the land, and the global politics that influenced the growth of early Texas. A centerpiece of the museum is the entire preserved hull from the French explorer La Salle's ship La Belle, along with thousands of artifacts recovered from that 1686 shipwreck.

The third floor explores land, culture and technology in Texas and includes sections dedicated to Texas ranching, oil, civil rights, science and space exploration, as well as Texas sports and music. The museum's Austin City Limits Theater features musical performance clips from the long-running PBS television series based in Austin.

== Programs and events ==
The Bullock Museum offers a year-round calendar of programs and events. Large-scale community events include H-E-B Free First Sunday, Austin's celebration of World Refugee Day, American Indian Heritage Day, and Spooktacular. The museum also hosts shows and social gatherings, lectures and discussions, drop-in preschool programs, film screenings, and seasonal family activities each spring break and summer. A popular attraction at the Bullock Museum is the Bullock IMAX and Texas Spirit Theatre which showcases current movie releases as well as films corresponding to the current museum exhibitions.
