= Valle del Pilón =

Valle del Pilón (Spanish for 'Pilón Valley') was an alcaldía mayor in the New Kingdom of León of New Spain, which encompassed the lands now known as the Nuevo León municipalities of Montemorelos, Doctor Coss, China, General Bravo, and General Terán in Mexico.

== History ==
Valle del Pilón was established by Spanish explorer Alonso de León, who in 1701 co-founded the town of San Mateo de Pilón (now Montemorelos).

The administrative centre of the alcaldía mayor was San Mateo de Pilón. Following the Mexican War of Independence in 1821, the Valle del Pilón became a part of the modern state of Nuevo León.

In 1825, the Valle del Pilón was divided into the five current municipalities of Montemorelos, Doctor Coss, China, General Bravo, and General Terán under the leadership of Nuevo León's first governor José María Parás. The Valle del Pilón no longer has any sort of recognized status in the state of Nuevo León, but the name is sometimes used to refer to the former historical region.

== Valle del Pilón Museum ==
The Valle del Pilón Museum is a museum in Montemorelos, Nuevo León. It is located in a region once known for its citrus production during the former Valle del Pilón. It occupies 3 hectares of land, including buildings and gardens. It was inaugurated on May 27, 2008, by then-governor of Nuevo León José Natividad González Parás, and became open to the public the next day.

The museum is housed in the former Montemorelos Vocational School, and goes over the history and origins of the Valle del Pilón, as well as the development of the region's main industries, such as citrus production and the industrial and medicinal uses of citrus fruits. The museum features six galleries that chronicle Valle del Pilón's history and has two additional spaces for temporary exhibitions. The museum also offers rooms for dance, music, and painting workshops.
