= Henri Joutel =

French explorer and soldier

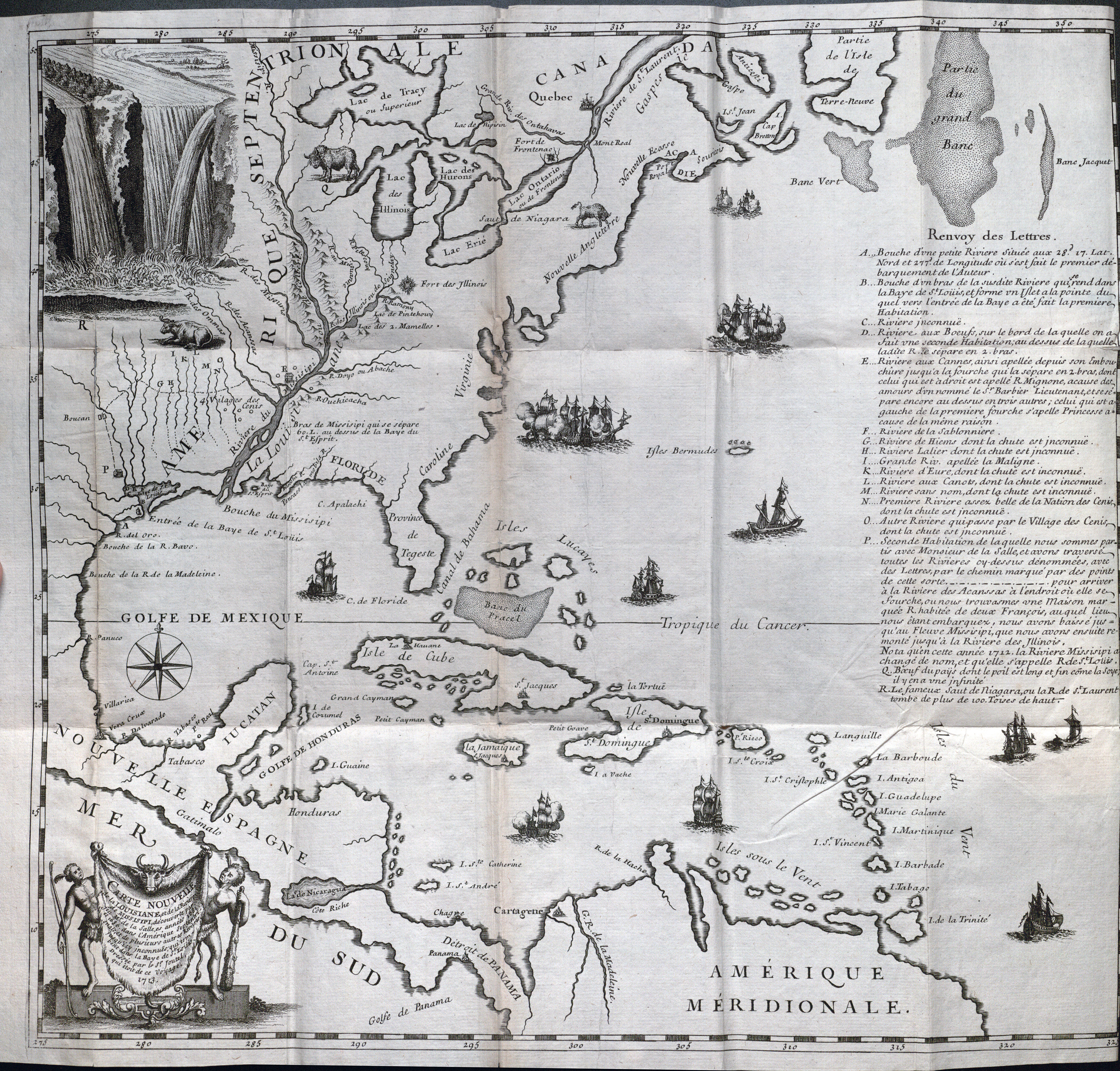
Carte Nouvelle de la Louisiane et de la Riviere de Missisipi (1713) prepared in part on the information provided by Joutel from the 1687–88 expedition

Henri Joutel (French pronunciation: [ɑ̃ʁi ʒutɛl]; c. 1643 – 1725), a French explorer and soldier, is known for his eyewitness history of the last North American expedition of René Robert Cavelier, Sieur de La Salle.

Joutel was born in Rouen. After serving as a soldier, he joined La Salle's expedition and became the commander of La Salle's southern colony and base of operations in the New World at Fort Saint-Louis (Texas). La Salle's expedition to plant a new settlement and secure earlier French claims had missed the approach to the mouth of the Mississippi River landing far to the southwest. After the loss of the colony's ships, a mutiny, and La Salle's murder by others, in 1687–88, Joutel led members of the expedition back to France, going north, over land and river, by way of the Illinois Country to New France in what became Canada. Joutel's journal provides some of the earliest written information on the interior, natural history, and ethnography of central North America.

After Joutel returned to France, he became a guard at the city gates of Rouen. He was unpersuaded by the Minister of Marine, Louis de Pontchartrain, to return to America but lent his journal. The journal returned to the Gulf Coast in the Iberville expedition that finally established a lasting French presence near the mouth of the Mississippi in 1699.

== Resources ==
- Henri Joutel, Joutel's Journal of La Salle's Last Voyage (London: Lintot, 1714; rpt., New York: Franklin, 1968).
- Pierre Margry, ed., Découvertes et établissements des Français dans l'ouest et dans le sud de l'Amérique septentrionale, 1614–1754 (6 vols., Paris: Jouast, 1876–86).
- Robert S. Weddle, The French Thorn: Rival Explorers in the Spanish Sea, 1682–1762 (College Station: Texas A&M University Press, 1991).
