= La Belle (ship) =

One of Robert de La Salle's four ships when he explored the Gulf of Mexico

Coordinates: 28.4481°N 96.3222°W

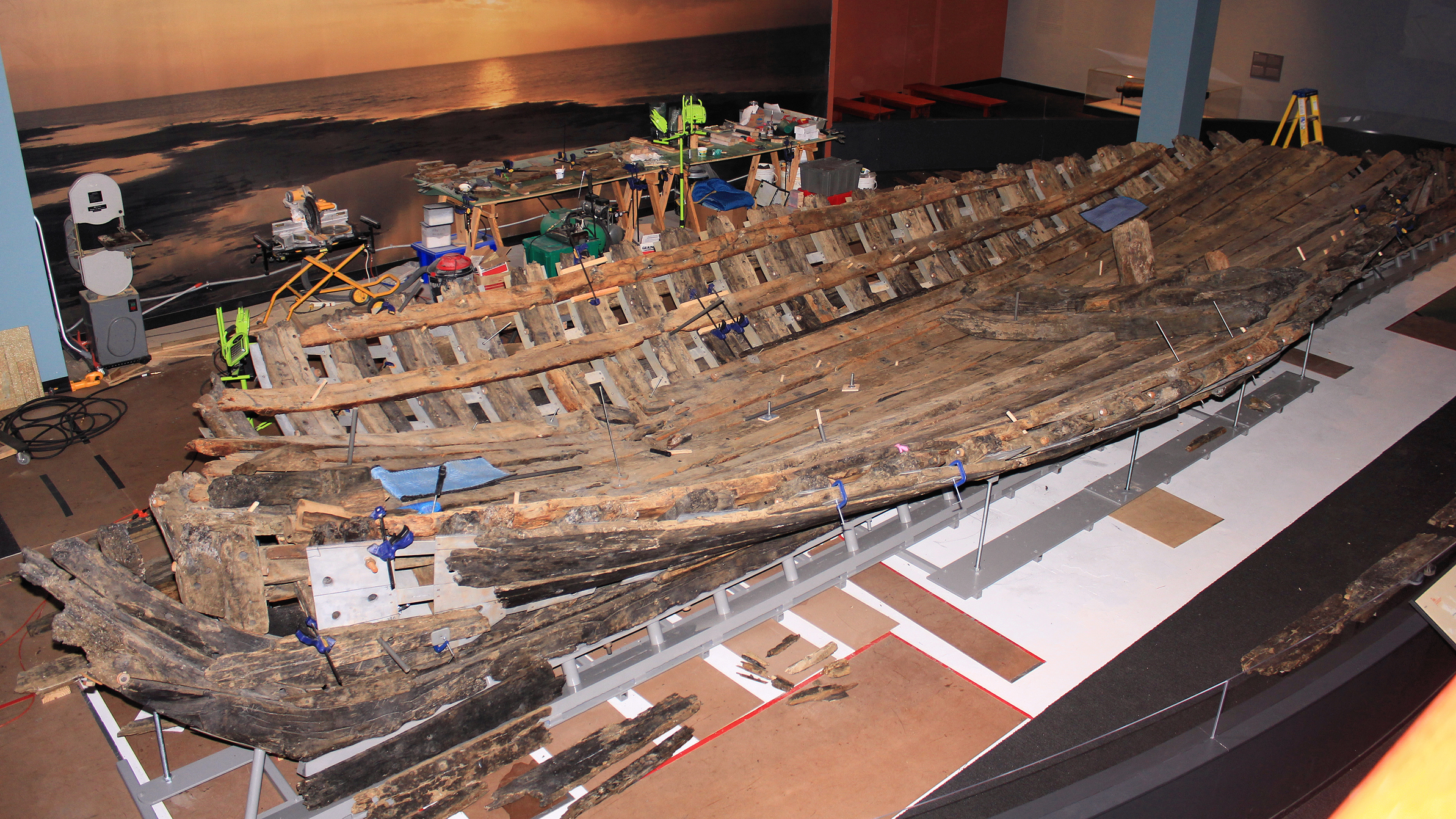
- The hull remains of La Belle undergoing reconstruction

History

France
- Name: La Belle
- Owner: Louis XIV
- Operator: René-Robert Cavelier, Sieur de La Salle
- Builder: Honoré Mallet
- Fate: Shipwrecked
- Status: Hull raised and on display at the Bullock Texas State History Museum

General characteristics
- Type: barque longue
- Tonnage: 40–45
- Length: 54 ft 4 in (16.56 m)
- Beam: 14 ft 9 in (4.50 m)
- Draft: 8 ft (2.4 m)

La Belle was one of Robert de La Salle's four ships when he explored the Gulf of Mexico with the ill-fated mission of starting a French colony at the mouth of the Mississippi River in 1685. La Belle was wrecked in present-day Matagorda Bay the following year, dooming La Salle's Texas colony to failure. The wreckage of La Belle lay forgotten until it was discovered by a team of state archaeologists in 1995. The discovery of La Salle's flagship was regarded as one of the most important archaeological finds of the century not only in Texas but in all of North America, and a major excavation was launched by the state of Texas that, over a period of about a year, recovered the entire shipwreck and over a million artifacts.

== Historical background ==
In the late 17th century, much of North America had been claimed by European countries. Spain claimed Florida, and New Spain included both today's Mexico and much of the southwestern part of the continent. The northern Atlantic coast was claimed by Britain, and New France included much of what is now Canada as well as the Illinois Country. France feared that their colonies in the center of the continent were vulnerable to potential attacks from their neighbors. In 1681, French nobleman René-Robert Cavelier, Sieur de La Salle, launched an expedition down the Mississippi River from New France, expecting to find a path to the Pacific Ocean. Instead, La Salle found a route to the Gulf of Mexico. Although Hernando de Soto had explored and claimed this area for Spain 140 years before, on April 9, 1682 La Salle claimed the Mississippi River valley for the French king, Louis XIV, naming the territory Louisiana in his honor.

La Salle knew that French control of the Mississippi would split Spanish Florida from New Spain, and he believed that the Mississippi River was near the edge of New Spain. On his return to France in 1683, La Salle argued that a small number of Frenchmen could successfully invade New Spain by relying on the help of 15,000 Indians who were angry over Spanish enslavement. This had been suggested as early as 1678 by Diego de Penalosa, the former governor of New Mexico who had fled to France after being targeted by the Inquisition. La Salle proposed establishing a colony at the mouth of the Mississippi, providing a base for promoting Christianity among the native peoples as well as a convenient location for attacking Nueva Vizcaya and gaining control of its lucrative silver mines. After Spain declared war on France in October 1683, Louis agreed to back La Salle, whose official duties now included "confirming the Indians' allegiance to the crown, leading them to the true faith, and maintaining intertribal peace".

== Construction ==
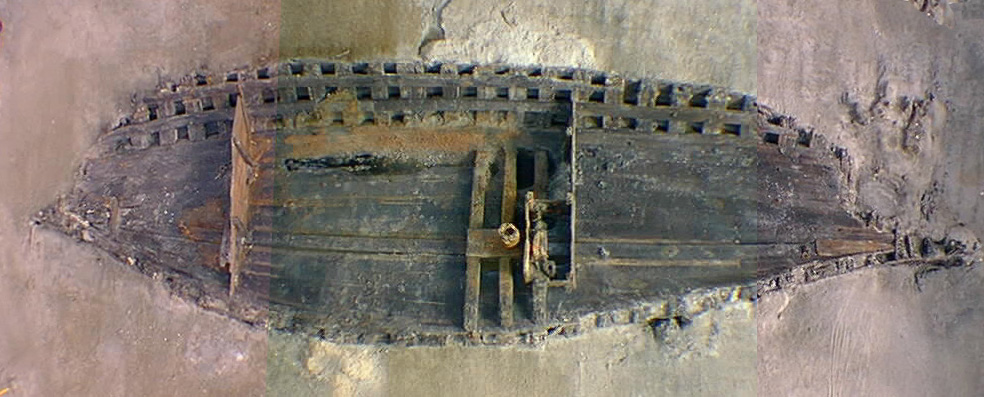
Remains of La Belle after excavation

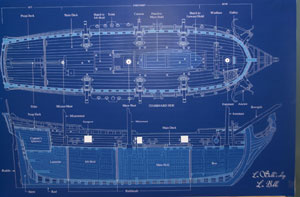
This blueprint of what La Belle would have looked like was created in the late 20th century, after excavation.

La Salle originally intended to sail to New France, journey overland to the Illinois Country, and then sail down the Mississippi River to its mouth, where he would plant his colony. To carry his supplies, he would need a large ship to traverse the Atlantic Ocean and a smaller one to transport the supplies from Illinois to the Gulf of Mexico. Louis XIV gave La Salle the use of two ships, Le Joly and La Belle. Originally, La Belle was built as a kit, with the ship frames assigned to one of four quadrants and numbered sequentially so that the pieces could be assembled later. The pieces were intended to be loaded onto Le Joly for transport to North America, and then would be carried overland to the Mississippi River. At that point, La Salle's men would assemble the ship, and it would be used to carry the supplies to their final destination. At the king's urging, the expedition chose instead to sail directly to the Gulf of Mexico rather than to New France, eliminating the need for a ship to be built in the New World. As the Joly was already heavily laden, La Salle decided that the ship should be assembled in France and sailed across the ocean. Although there were some questions as to whether the ship would survive an ocean crossing, it was nevertheless assembled in France in less than two months and prepared for its journey.

In the late 17th century, the French shipbuilding industry had stagnated. In an effort to "invigorate" the industry, Secretary of State of the Navy, Jean-Baptiste Colbert, brought shipbuilders trained in the Mediterranean methods of shipbuilding to Rochefort, where the industry primarily used what was known as the Atlantic shipbuilding method. One of these transplanted shipwrights was Honoré Mallet, who had been raised in Toulon in the south of France. In the official order authorizing the building of La Belle, Mallet was listed as the master shipbuilder, and his son-in-law, Pierre Masson, was responsible for the ship design.

La Belle was a barque-longue, with three masts and a relatively shallow draft of about 8 feet (2 m). Her beam was officially 14 feet 9 inches (4.50 m), and she was 54 feet 4 inches (16.56 m) long with a cargo capacity of 40–45 tons. The ship was designed to be highly maneuverable, with the mainmast and foremast holding two sails each, while the mizzenmast supported a single triangular sail, and another small square sail hung from the bowsprit.

== Voyage ==
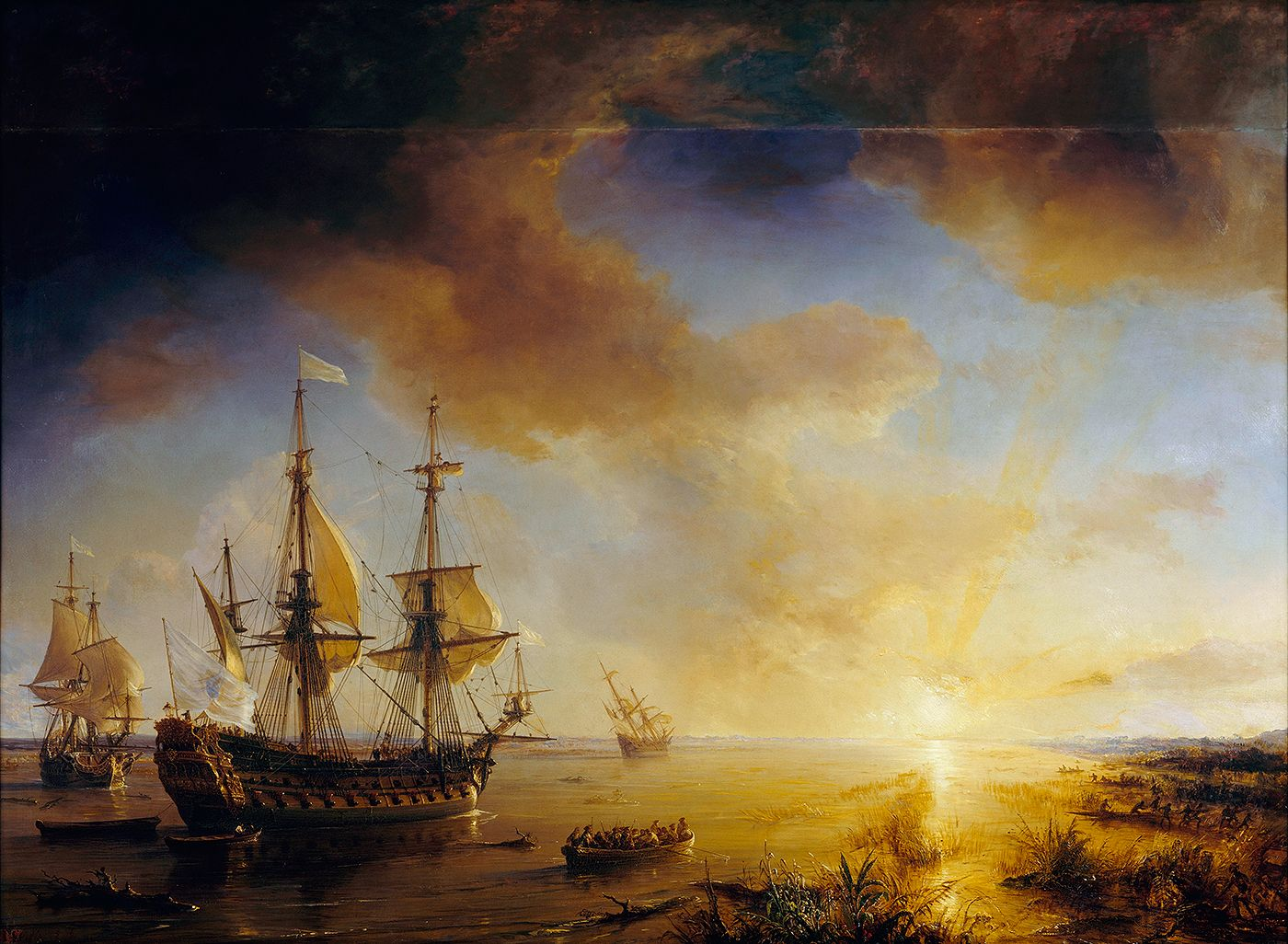
La Salle's Expedition to Louisiana in 1684, painted in 1844 by Jean Antoine Théodore de Gudin. La Belle is on the left, Le Joly is in the middle, and L'Aimable is grounded on the right.

On July 24, 1684, La Salle left La Rochelle with four ships: the 36-gun man-of-war Le Joly, the 300-ton storeship L'Aimable, the barque La Belle, and the ketch St. Francois. The ships carried almost 300 people, including 100 soldiers, six missionaries, eight merchants, over a dozen women and children, and artisans and craftsmen. The St. Francois and its full load of supplies, provisions, and tools for the colony were captured by Spanish privateers in Santo Domingo. In late November 1684, the three remaining ships continued their search for the Mississippi River delta. Before they left, local sailors warned them that the Gulf currents flowed east, and would carry the ships toward the Florida straits unless they corrected for it. On December 18, the ships reached the Gulf of Mexico and entered waters that Spain claimed as their sole territory. None of the members of the expedition had ever been in the Gulf of Mexico or knew how to navigate it. The expedition was unable to find the Mississippi due to a combination of inaccurate maps, La Salle's previous miscalculation of the latitude of the mouth of the Mississippi River, and overcorrecting for the currents. Instead, they landed at Matagorda Bay in Spanish Texas in early 1685, 400 miles (644 km) west of the Mississippi.

Although La Belle was able to easily navigate the pass into the Bay, the Aimable was grounded on a sandbar. A bad storm prevented them from recovering more than food, cannons, powder, and a small amount of the merchandise from the ship, and by March 7 she had sunk. Beaujeu, having fulfilled his mission in escorting them, returned to France aboard the Joly in mid-March, leaving La Belle the only ship available to the remaining settlers.

Supplies loaded onto the La Belle in October 1685
4800 livres	dried meat or bacon
2000 livres	gold, arms, tools
2 livres	butter
108 hundredweights	bread or flour
90 hundredweights	powder and lead
8	pigs
10 casks	wine or brandy
3 casks	vinegar
salt and oil
cannons, petards
forge
all items belonging to La Salle

La Salle chose to establish Fort Saint Louis on a bluff overlooking Garcitas Creek, 50 miles (80 km) from their initial campsite. With their permanent camp established, the colonists took several short trips within the next few months to further explore their surroundings. At the end of October La Salle decided to undertake a longer expedition and reloaded the La Belle with much of the remaining supplies. He took 50 men, plus the La Belle's crew of 27 sailors, leaving behind 34 men, women, and children. The bulk of the men traveled with La Salle in canoes, while the La Belle followed further off the coast. Several of the men, including the captain of the La Belle, Canil Maraud, died on this expedition from eating prickly pear. Soon after, the Karankawa killed a small group of the men, including the new captain of La Belle, former pilot Eli Richaud, who had camped on the shore at night. In January 1686, La Salle left the ship 30 miles (48 km) from Fort Saint Louis. La Salle took 20 men with him to travel overland to reach the Mississippi, leaving Pierre Tessier, the former second in command of the La Belle, in charge of the ship. After three months of searching overland, La Salle's group returned, but were unable to find the La Belle where they had left her and were forced to walk back to the fort.

=== Loss ===
While La Salle was gone, the ship began to run low of drinking water. Tessier sent the five best sailors ashore in the La Belle's only longboat to search for water. The men were seen struggling against a strong wind to return to the ship as night fell, and were presumed lost when the longboat never arrived at the ship. The remaining sailors drank wine in place of water, but the alcohol further dehydrated them, and several died.

Tessier finally decided that the ship must return to Fort Saint Louis for more supplies. As they got underway, a cold front blew in. Since the remaining crewmembers were unskilled, they were unable to keep control of the ship, and because they had lost their second anchor, there was no way to stop the ship from drifting in the wind. Within a short amount of time, the La Belle had run aground at the southern end of the bay, approximately a quarter of a mile (400 m) from shore.

When the storm had abated, the men built a raft from planks and barrels and sent two men to shore. The raft broke up in the waves, and both men drowned. After making a second, more solid, raft, the others were able to make it safely to shore. Over the next few days they returned to the ship daily to retrieve cargo, managing to salvage some of La Salle's papers and clothes, barrels of flour, casks of wine, glass beads, and other trade items. Before long, however, a strong southerly wind drove the hull into the muddy bottom, and soon only the rear deck remained above water. Of the 27 people originally assigned to the ship, the only survivors were Tessier, a priest, a military officer, a regular soldier, a servant girl, and a small boy. They remained on the peninsula for three months, as the only way to the fort was to walk through Karankawa territory. After a small Indian canoe washed ashore one day, the survivors were able to paddle across the bay and return to the fort. The destruction of their last ship left the settlers stranded on the Texas coast, with no hope of any assistance from the French colonies in the Caribbean Sea.

== Discovery by the Spanish ==
The Spanish authorities learned of La Salle's expedition when a former member of the colony, Denis Thomas, was captured aboard a pirate ship. In an attempt to save his life, Thomas related that La Salle had planned to establish a colony near the Mississippi River and eventually take over Spanish silver mines. Although Thomas was quickly hanged, the Spanish believed his information to be reliable and began searching for the French colony. On December 25, 1686, a Spanish expedition led by Captain Martin de Rivas and Captain Pedro de Yriarte left Veracruz to sail along the Gulf Coast. On April 4, they reached Matagorda Bay and dispatched several canoes to explore the area. 3 miles (4.8 km) from their ship, they discovered La Belle, which they described as a "broken ship" with three fleur-de-lys on her stern.

The Spanish salvaged two swivel guns and five cannons from the ship, as well as the anchor, some cordage, and the masts, which they made into oars. As final proof that this ship had belonged to the French colony, the expedition also discovered the campsite where the French survivors had lived for three months. Among the remains of the campsite were pages from books written in French.

== Rediscovery ==
The wreck lay forgotten for over three hundred years in the dark murky waters of Matagorda Bay. In the 1970s, Kathleen Gilmore of Southern Methodist University analyzed historical accounts of the La Salle shipwrecks, and gave general guidance as to where they might be found. In 1977, the Texas Historical Commission (THC) asked an independent researcher to search the archives in Paris for information on the shipwrecks. She found original copies of maps made by La Salle's engineer, Jean-Baptiste Minet. Before Minet returned to France aboard the Joly, he had created detailed maps of Matagorda Bay and the pass and had marked the spot where L'Aimable had sunk. Other researchers discovered additional historical maps, including several that marked La Belle's resting place.

In 1978, Barto Arnold, the State Marine Archaeologist for the Texas Antiquities Committee (the predecessor to the Texas Historical Commission), proposed a ten-week search for La Salle's ships. In a magnetometer survey of the area of the bay deemed a high probability to be La Belle's location, the expedition found several more recent shipwrecks. A lack of funding for the next seventeen years stymied further attempts to locate La Belle.

In June 1995 the Texas Historical Commission organized a second magnetometer survey, led by Barto Arnold, to search high-probability areas not included in earlier surveys. The most important technological development since the original survey was the advent of the differential GPS positioning system, which made navigation and the relocation of targets considerably easier and more accurate. This survey lasted the entire month and utilized a Geometrics 866 proton precession magnetometer which identified 39 "magnetic features that required further investigation". These were prioritized, and on 5 July 1995 divers were sent to the highest priority location.

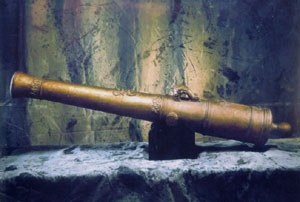
The first of three bronze 4-pounder cannons discovered in the hold of La Belle, recovered in July 1995. The remaining two guns are pictured below.

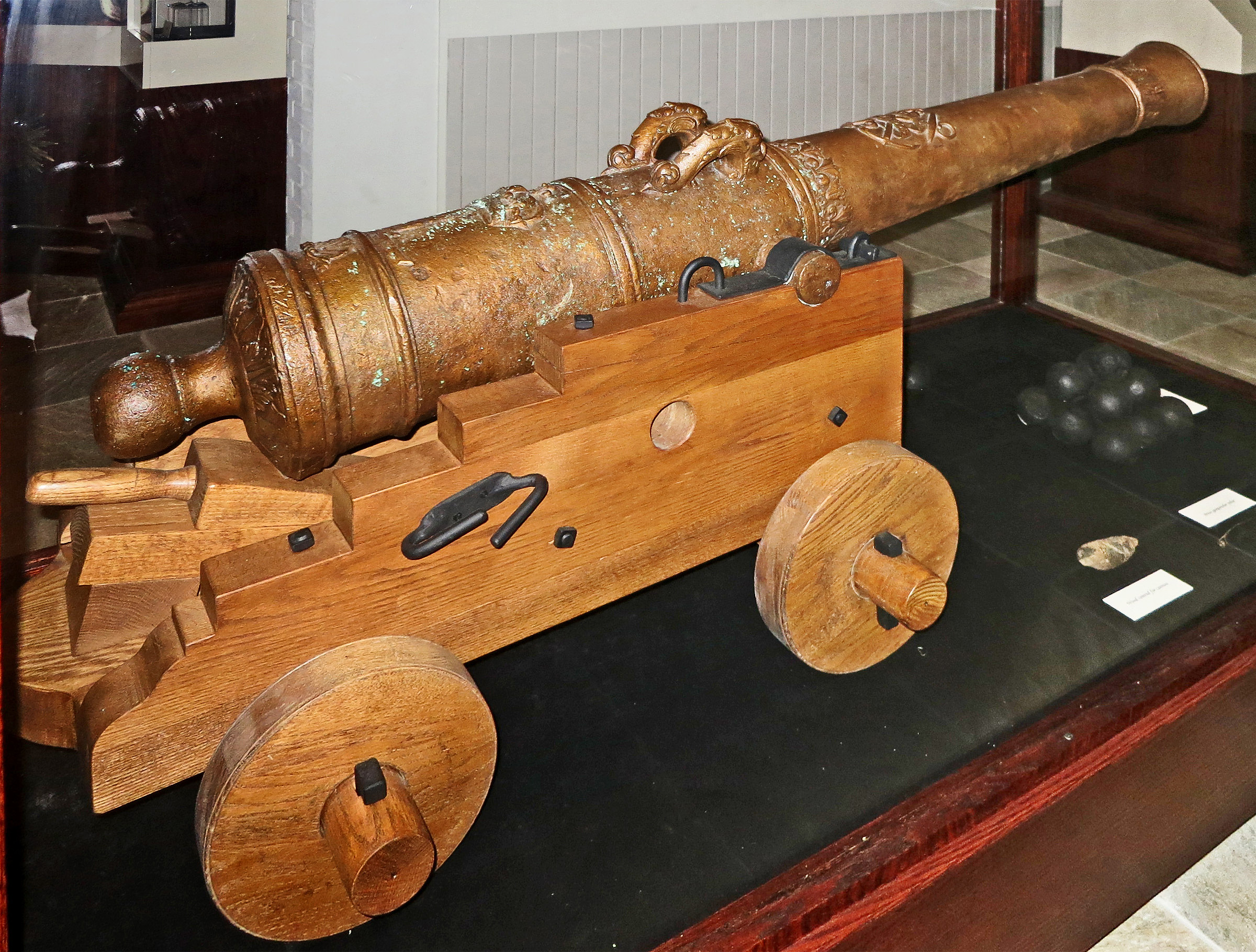
One of the three cannons recovered.

During the initial diving operations, a prop-wash blower (metal pipe fitted over the propeller to deflect its force down to the seafloor) was used, ostensibly to improve water visibility by forcing surface water down towards the bottom. It was later decided by the archaeologists that the blower should be turned off as it was visibly damaging the delicate material of the cargo remains. It is not known exactly how much sediment covered the shipwreck at the time of its discovery because the prop-wash blower was deployed before sending divers down. The first team of divers reported feeling musket balls on the seafloor along with loose fragments of wood moving in the current created by the blower. These materials strongly suggested that this was indeed a shipwreck site. During the second dive, archaeologist Chuck Meide discovered a bronze cannon which, when subsequently recovered, proved that this shipwreck was indeed that of La Belle. The cannon was ornately decorated, and bore the crest of King Louis and the Count of Vermandois, the Admiral of France. An illegitimate son of Louis XIV, Vermandois served as Admiral of the French fleet until his death in 1683, meaning the cannon would have been cast no later than 1683, the time when La Salle was preparing for his voyage. This was considered strong circumstantial evidence that the ship was La Belle. A serial number on the gun (and two others found in 1997) was later matched in a French archival record discovered by Dr. John de Bry with the numbers of four bronze cannons that had been loaded onto La Belle, providing definitive proof of the wreck's identity.

The shipwreck may have been known to one or more local watermen before its discovery by archaeologists. During the 1996 excavations, Texas Historical Commission archaeologists observed direct evidence that one of the four bronze cannons known to have been on La Belle had been removed from the wreckage some time before the 1995 discovery of the wreck, possibly decades earlier. It was surmised that this may have been the action of a local shrimper who may have accidentally snagged and recovered the gun in his nets. The whereabouts of this cannon remain a mystery, and no other clear signs of prior artifact recovery were observed at the wreck site.

== Archaeological excavation ==
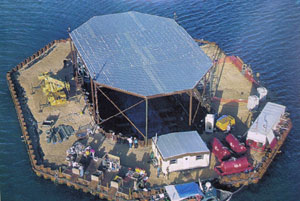
The cofferdam built around La Belle

The team of state archaeologists spent one month diving on the wreckage, documenting its extent and condition, and recovering a number of artifacts. Because of the historical significance of the wreck, and because of the dark waters of the Bay which severely limited visibility for divers, the decision was made to construct a cofferdam around the wreck site. This was a double-walled steel structure, with compacted sand between the two walls, surrounding the entire wreck. The 1.5 million dollar structure was paid for by the state of Texas, though private funding and federal grants would fund much of the subsequent excavation. After completion in September 1996, the water inside the cofferdam was pumped out and the ship was exposed to air for the first time in centuries.

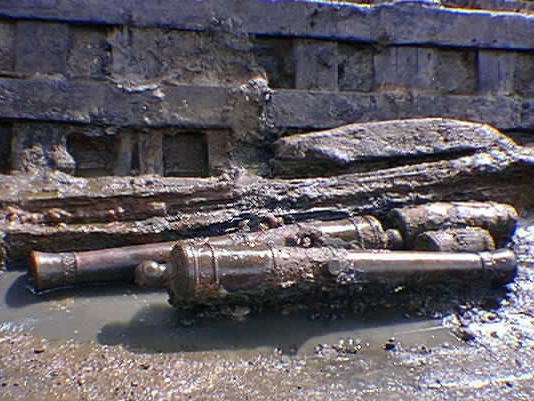
Bronze cannon and other artifacts exposed in the lowermost part of the hull remains as seen during the final stages of excavation in February 1997.

A much larger team of archaeologists, numbering around 20, had been assembled in the nearby town of Palacios and were charged with the complete excavation of the shipwreck, under the direction of Barto Arnold at first, and then Dr. Jim Bruseth. This endeavor lasted from July 1996 to May 1997, and was considered one of the most significant maritime archaeological excavations of its time. As the muddy sediments were carefully removed from the wreckage, many wooden boxes and casks were exposed loaded with a wide variety of artifacts. La Belle had contained all of the salvaged supplies from La Salle's wrecked storeship (L'Amiable) and thus offered a unique insight into the supplies deemed necessary for a successful colonization venture. As this was considered enemy territory by the French (Texas was claimed by their Spanish rivals) and local Indians proved hostile, there was a wide array of weapons on board the vessel, including three bronze cannons, one iron swivel gun, several boxes of muskets, many casks of lead shot and gunpowder, a handful of ceramic firepots (used like hand grenades), several sword handles, and several petards. There were also numerous trade goods, including hundreds of thousands of blue, white, and black glass beads, brass finger rings with Catholic religious symbols, brass pins, brass hawk bells, wooden combs, and a barrel of iron axe heads. Tools and supplies such as a cooper's plane, a shovel, rope, long bars of iron stock, and a barrel of axe heads were also recovered, as were a wide variety of ship's hardware and rigging components. Faunal remains included the remains of salt pork, skeletons of rats, and the trophy skulls of deer, complete with antlers. One complete human skeleton was discovered, that of a middle-aged male with signs of arthritis. Part of this individual's brain was intact, preserved by the anaerobic environment caused by the thick muddy sediments at the bottom of the bay. After osteological analysis, these human remains were buried at the Texas State Cemetery.

All of the artifacts were removed from the hull by the start of March 1997. From that point on, the archaeologists concentrated on the remains of the ship itself. The entire ship was disassembled, each timber being carefully recorded before and after its removal from the hull remains. Fieldwork was completed by May 1997, after which the cofferdam was disassembled and sold. The recovered timbers were eventually reassembled in a special cradle and vat designed at Texas A&M University's Nautical Archaeology Program, the institution in charge of the conservation of all the artifacts recovered from the shipwreck site after 1995. The hull was treated by long-term soaking in polyethylene glycol and freeze-drying, a process which took over ten years.

== Exhibit ==
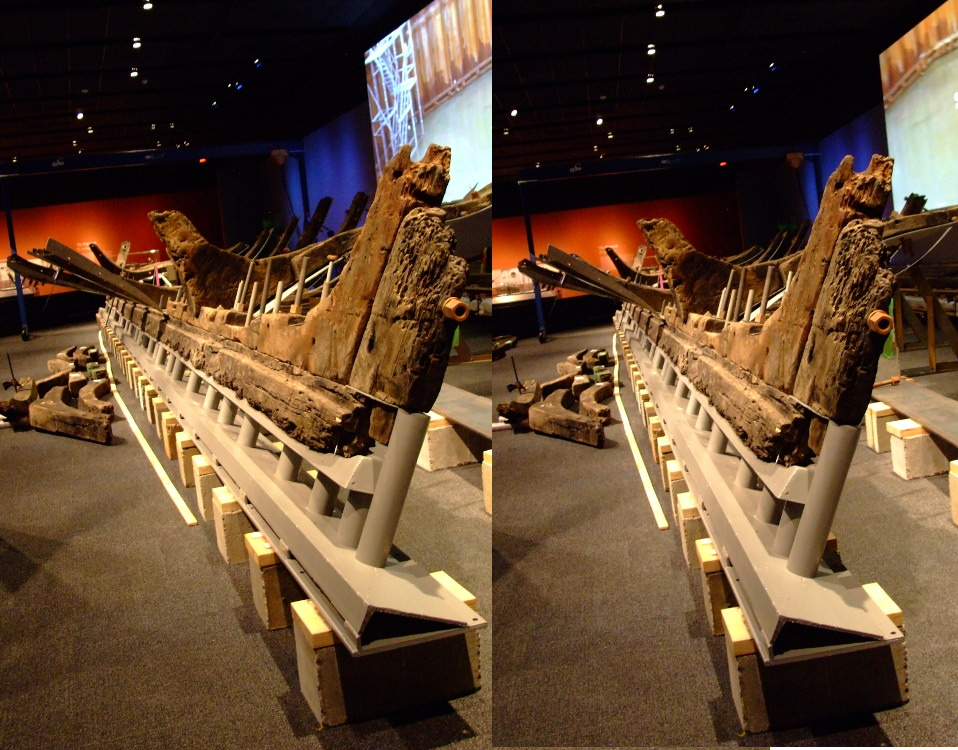
Stereoscopic view from the stern of the hull of La Belle undergoing reassembly in Austin, December 2014

In October 2014 the La Belle: The Ship That Changed History exhibit officially opened. The hull of the ship and many of the recovered artifacts, including colored glass beads, brass pots, a colander, a ladle, muskets, powder horns, an early explosive device called a fire pot and a bronze cannon with lifting handles shaped like dolphins, are on display at the Bullock Texas State History Museum in the state capital of Austin. Many more artifacts can be seen in the multi-location La Salle Odyssey exhibit, located in museums around Texas. The Corpus Christi Museum of Science and History is the official repository of artifacts. The Museum of the Coastal Bend in Victoria, Texas also has many artifacts from the La Belle, mainly the other seven cannons from Fort St. Louis.

== Ownership ==
After the excavation was completed, the French government filed an official claim for the ship and its contents. Under international naval laws, an official naval vessel is owned by the country for which the ship flies its flag. Despite a long-standing tradition repeated by American historians that La Belle was a personal gift from the King to La Salle, no documentary evidence confirming this claim could be produced. Instead, archival research conducted in French depositories provided two official documents which listed La Belle as being owned by the King but provided to La Salle for his colonization mission. Madeleine Albright conceded the claim in favor of France just before the end of the Clinton administration. After a several-year negotiation, an agreement was signed on March 31, 2003 which gives official title to the wreck and its artifacts to the Musée national de la Marine in Paris. Day-to-day control was granted to the Texas Historical Commission for 99 years.
