= Jean Gery =

French explorer

Jean Gery (before 1638 – 1690?) (also spelled Jean Jarry, Yan Jarri or Jean Henri) was a French explorer and a deserter from the La Salle expedition of 1685. After leaving the expedition, Gery became chief of a group of Coahuiltecan Indians, claiming that he had been sent by God to rule over them. He was brought to Monclova, and later to Mexico City, by Alonso de León, the Spanish governor of Coahuila.

Gery was interrogated by Spanish officials, and could not tell a coherent tale, though he consistently claimed to have originally come from a French fort to the east. Despite the fact that the Spanish had concluded that Gery was insane, he was sent along with de León on an expedition to locate this French fort. Despite Gery's mental instability, he was invaluable as a translator and guide, eventually leading de León to the remains of Fort St. Louis on April 20, 1689.

After returning to Coahuila, de León sent Gery to rendezvous with representatives of an Indian tribe at the Rio Grande. This is the last known mention of Gery, who presumably died before de León's next Texas expedition. "On this journey I sorely missed the old Frenchman," de León later wrote, "because of his knowledge of all the Indian languages of the region. He was always found faithful. Only with his help was it possible to discover the settlement he came from."
