= Alonso de León =

Explorer and governor in New Spain

- Born: 1639; Cadereyta (presently Montemorelos), New Kingdom of León, New Spain
- Died: 21 March 1691 (aged 51–52); Cadereyta, New Kingdom of Leon, New Spain
- Occupations: explorer and governor

Alonso "El Mozo" de León González (c. 1639 – 1691) was an explorer and governor in New Spain who led several expeditions into the area that is now northeastern Mexico and southern Texas.

== Early life ==
Alonso de León González was born in 1639, in the settlement of Cadereyta, Nuevo León in New Spain. He was the third son of General Alonso Perez de Leon (Ciudad de Mexico, 30 August 1608 – Valle del Pilón, 17 July 1661), a celebrated chronicler, historian and conquistador of the frontier of Nuevo León, and Josefa González. To distinguish him from his father, who was also a prominent leader in the colony, sometimes the phrase, El Mozo, would later be appended to his name (or its English equivalent, "the younger").

Alonso de León

De León trained in Spain for a naval career and joined the Spanish navy in 1657. By 1660 he had returned to Nuevo León. He was frequently appointed to lead exploratory parties, and he became an entrepreneur, most notably in salt mining. De León married Agustina Cantú and had six children with her.

== Expeditions ==
In 1684, French explorer La Salle led an ill-fated expedition which was intended to establish a colony at the mouth of the Mississippi River. Instead, the colonists ended up on the Texas coast, where La Salle established a settlement. When Spanish leaders received word that the French had founded a settlement in the northern portion of their territory, De León was chosen to lead the effort to locate and expel the French colonists.

The first two expeditions, in 1686 and 1687, yielded no evidence of the French colony. One Frenchman, Jean Gery, was captured during the third expedition in 1688. It was during De León's fourth expedition, in 1689, that he finally discovered La Salle's settlement, which had been abandoned by that time.

== Political offices and later life ==
De León served as mayor of Cadereyta from 1667 to 1675. He was governor of Nuevo León from 1682 to 1684. In 1687, he was appointed governor of Nueva Extremadura, New Spain.

He was involved in establishing San Francisco de los Tejas in 1690, the first Spanish mission in East Texas. In doing so, he blazed the trail for much of the Old San Antonio Road. During his expeditions, he named several Texas rivers, including the San Marcos River, the Guadalupe, the Medina, the Nueces, and the Trinity.

De León died in Coahuila on March 21, 1691.
