= Gudin =

Gudin is a surname. Notable people with the name include:

- Charles-Étienne Gudin de la Sablonnière (1768–1812), French general
- Eugênio Gudin (1886–1986), Brazilian liberal economist and finance minister
- Henriette Gudin (1825–1892), French marine painter
- Maurice Gudin de Vallerin (1897–1981), French equestrian
- Théodore Gudin (1802–1880), French marine painter and court painter
- Vasily Gudin (born 1977), Russian curler and curling coach
