= Henriette Gudin =

French painter

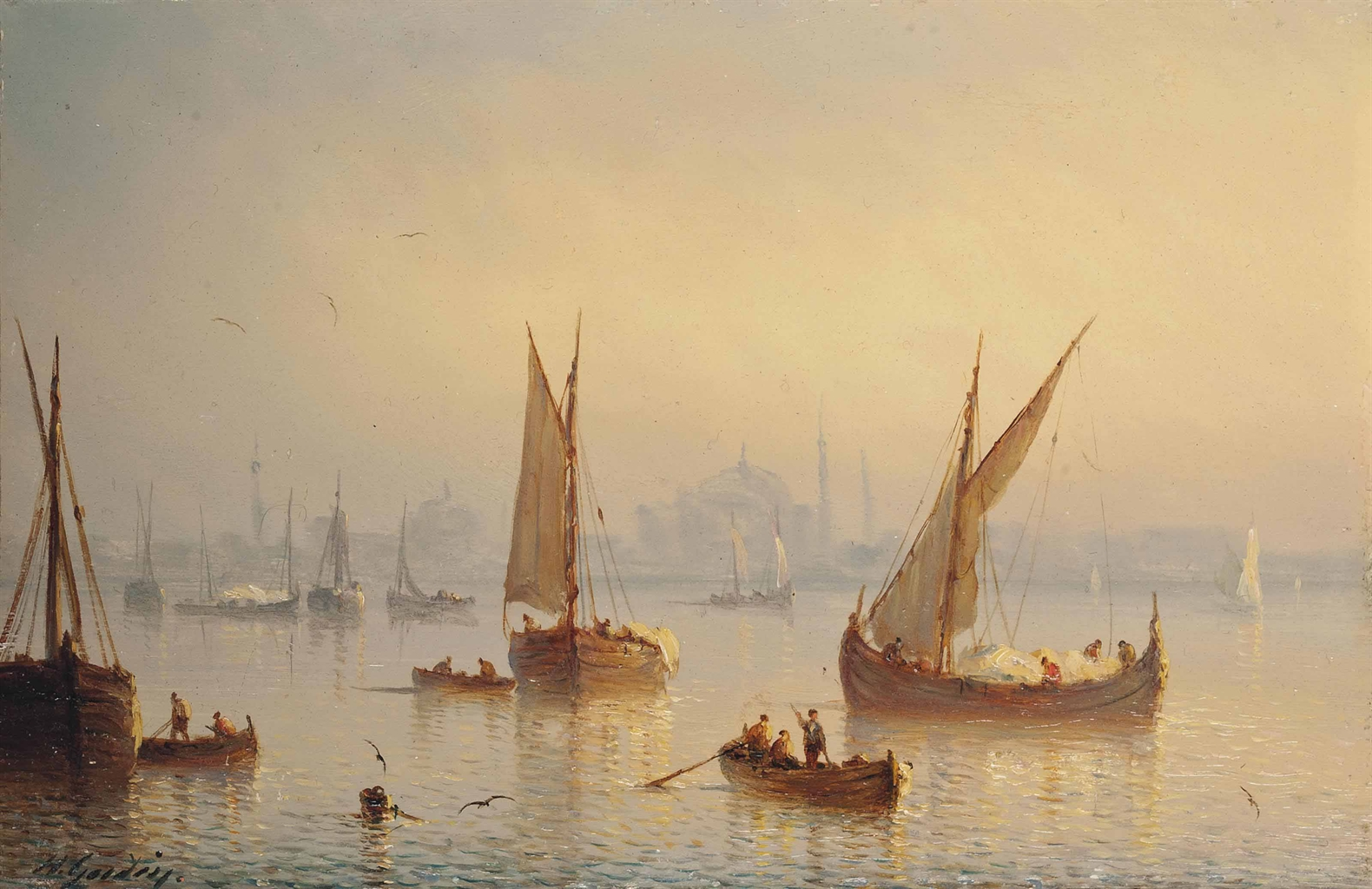
Henriette Gudin, Vessels on the Bosphorus, c. 1850.

Henriette Gudin (May 17, 1825 – July 14, 1892) was a French marine painter.

== Biography ==
Henriette Herminie Louise Gudin was born in Paris, the daughter of the painter Jean Antoine Théodore de Gudin. Like her father, she became a marine painter. Her generally serene compositions emphasize boats in the middle distance under hazy skies with diffuse, otherworldly light. She exhibited at the Paris Salon of 1849, 1850, and 1853, and her work is in the collection of the Calvet Museum in Avignon.

In 1850, she married Étienne François Fauchier. For a time, she continued to sign her paintings with her birth name, only beginning to use the name 'Mme Fauchier' on her paintings around 1864.
