= Théodore Gudin =

French painter

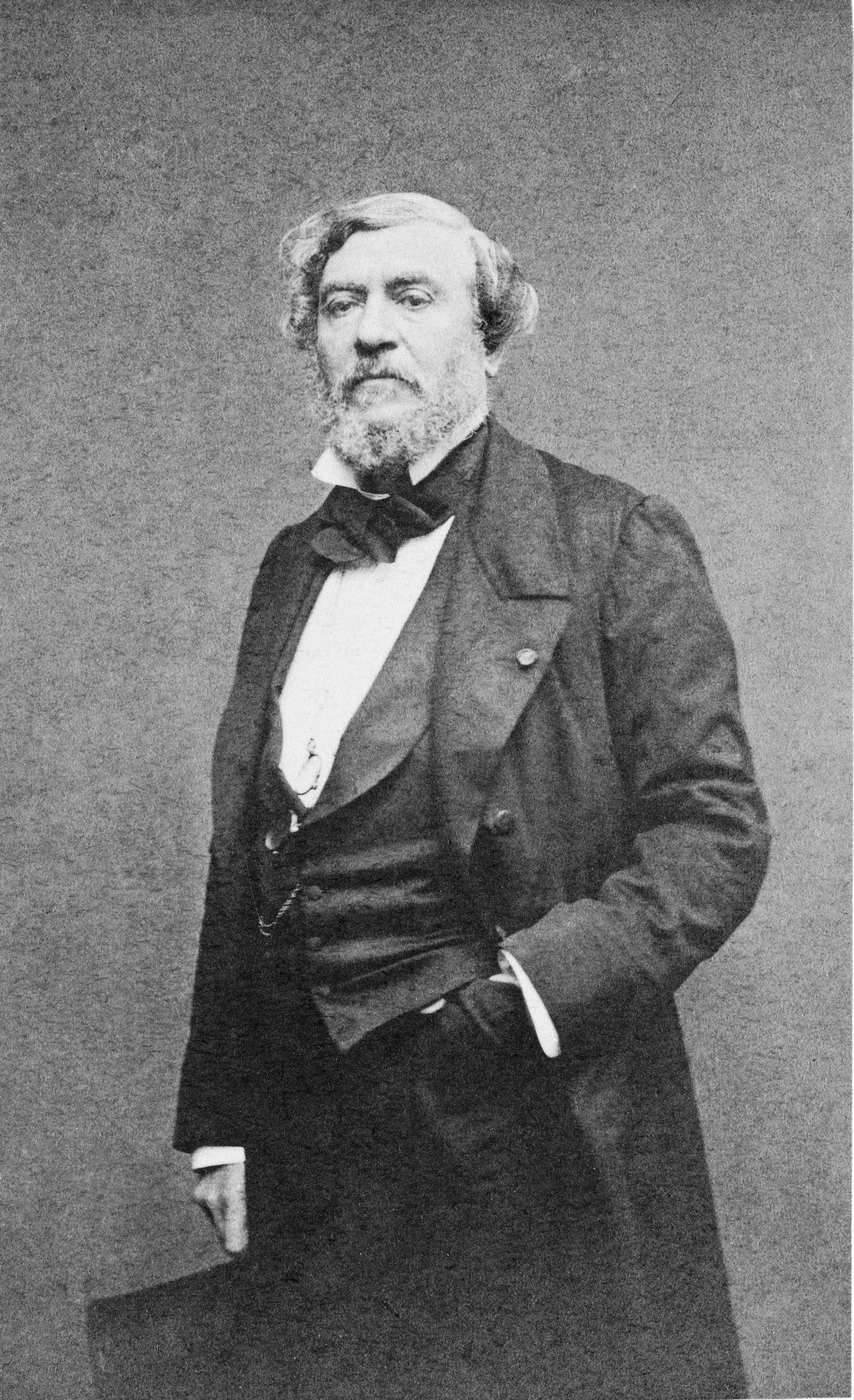
- Théodore Gudin, photograph by Étienne Carjat (c.1865)
- Born: 8 August 1802, 12 August 1802, 15 August 1802; Paris
- Died: 11 April 1880, 12 April 1880 (aged 77); Boulogne-Billancourt
- Occupation: Painter, visual artist, etcher, lithographer, graphic artist

Signature
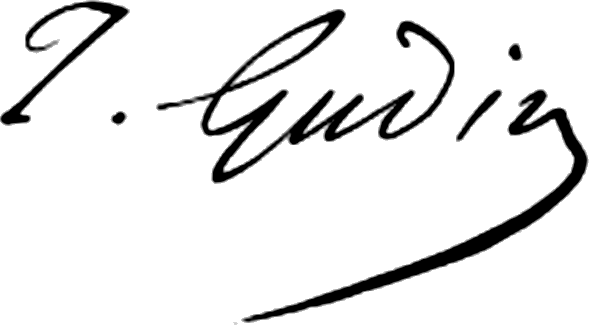

Jean Antoine Théodore Gudin (15 August 1802 – 11 April 1880) was a French painter who specialised in marine art and served as a court painter to Louis Philippe I and Napoleon III. Along with Louis-Philippe Crépin, he became one of the first two official Peintres de la Marine in 1830.

== Life ==
Gudin was born in Paris. Nothing is known of his father and, in his memoirs, he seems to suggest that his mother was a widow who took full responsibility for raising him and his older brother, Jean-Louis (1799–1823). He was enrolled at a naval school, but quit his studies to go to New York, where he mingled with the Bonapartists in exile. In 1819, he joined the United States Navy and sailed aboard the Manchester Packet, a 250-ton brig.

In 1822, he returned to Paris and, inspired by his brother (who had become a student of Horace Vernet) he decided to pursue a career in art and found a position in the studios of Anne-Louis Girodet. He made his debut at the Salon that same year. The following year, he and his brother were involved in a shipwreck on the Seine, from which he escaped. His brother drowned, however, and this affected him deeply for the rest of his life. In 1824, he had another exhibition at the Salon of 1824 and won the support of future King Louis Philippe I with a painting of the ship that had taken him on a visit to America. In 1828, King Charles X commissioned him to paint a depiction of Ensign Hippolyte Bisson who, the year before, had blown up his ship rather than surrender it to pirates. Shortly after, Gudin went with his friend, French Navy officer Abel Aubert du Petit-Thouars, to participate in the Algerian Expedition, where he made numerous sketches.

Upon his return, he was named a "Peintre de la Marine" at the court of Louis Philippe. Over the next few years, he made painting trips to Italy, Switzerland and Russia. He was then created a Baron by the King and commissioned to produce ninety paintings on French naval history for the Palace of Versailles, a monumental task that apparently undermined his health.

He was named an officer in the Legion of Honor in 1841. Following an exhibit in Berlin in 1845, he received the cross Pour le Mérite. In 1844, he married Louise Margaret Hay (1820–1890), daughter of the British General James Hay (1788–1862) and goddaughter of the King. They had three children, including the painter Henriette Gudin.

During the French Revolution of 1848, he divided his time between France and England and remained neutral. However, during the Coup d'État of 1851, he came down firmly on the side of the Republicans. In 1857, he was named a Commander in the Legion of Honor. In 1865, back in favor with the Bonapartes, he accompanied the Emperor, Napoléon III, to Algeria and returned by way of Tangiers on the Imperial corvette Reine Hortense.

He served as vice-president of the Société centrale de sauvetage des naufragés, which he helped to create in 1864, in memory of his late brother Jean Louis. After the fall of the Empire in 1870, he went into self-imposed exile in England and used the name "Gordon". He was able to return to France in 1879, following the death of Louis-Napoléon Bonaparte, and died at Boulogne-Billancourt in 1880.

== Gallery ==
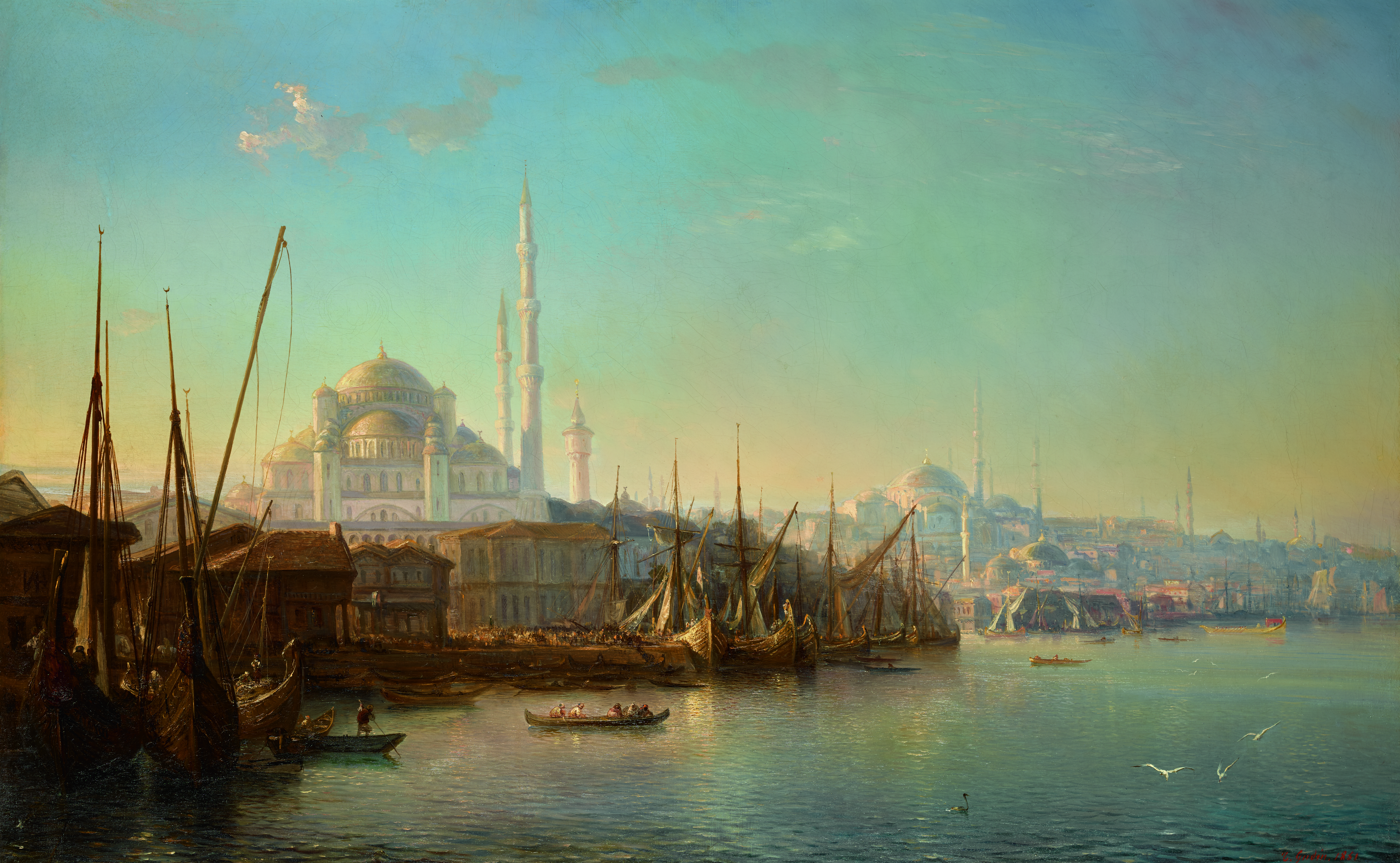
The Golden Horn (1851)

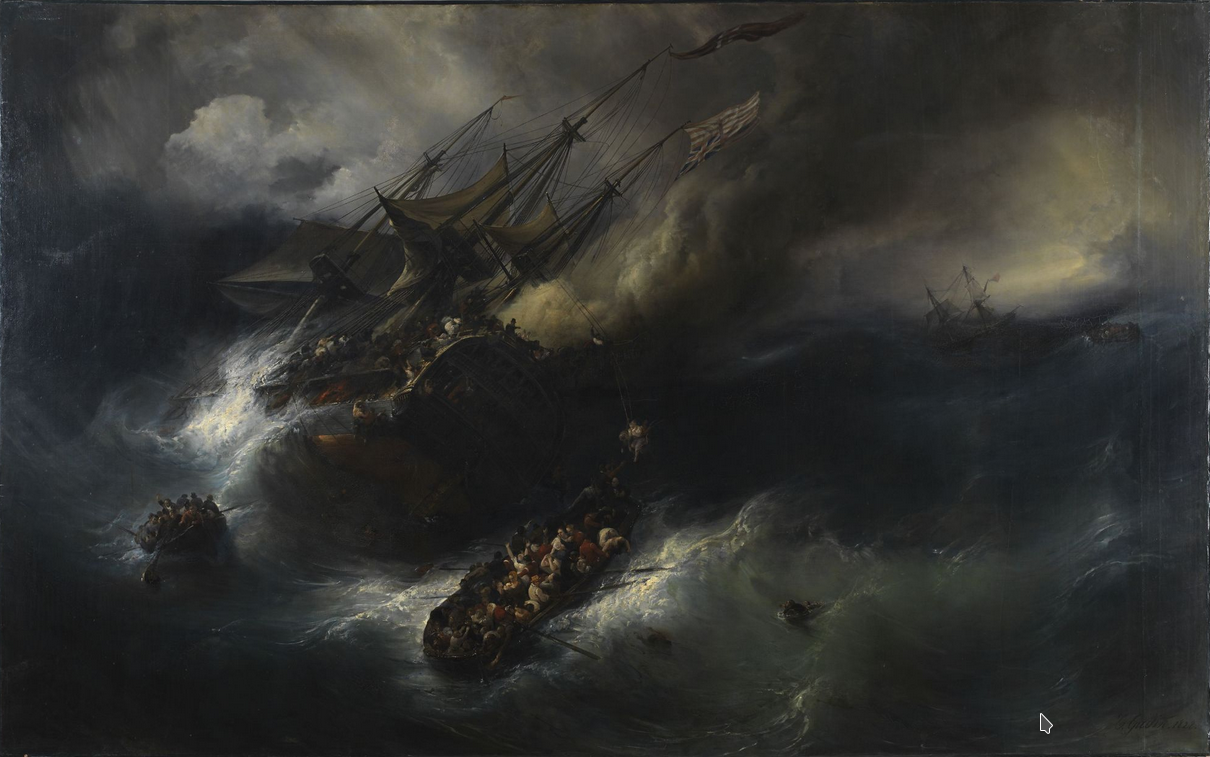
Burning of Kent (1827)

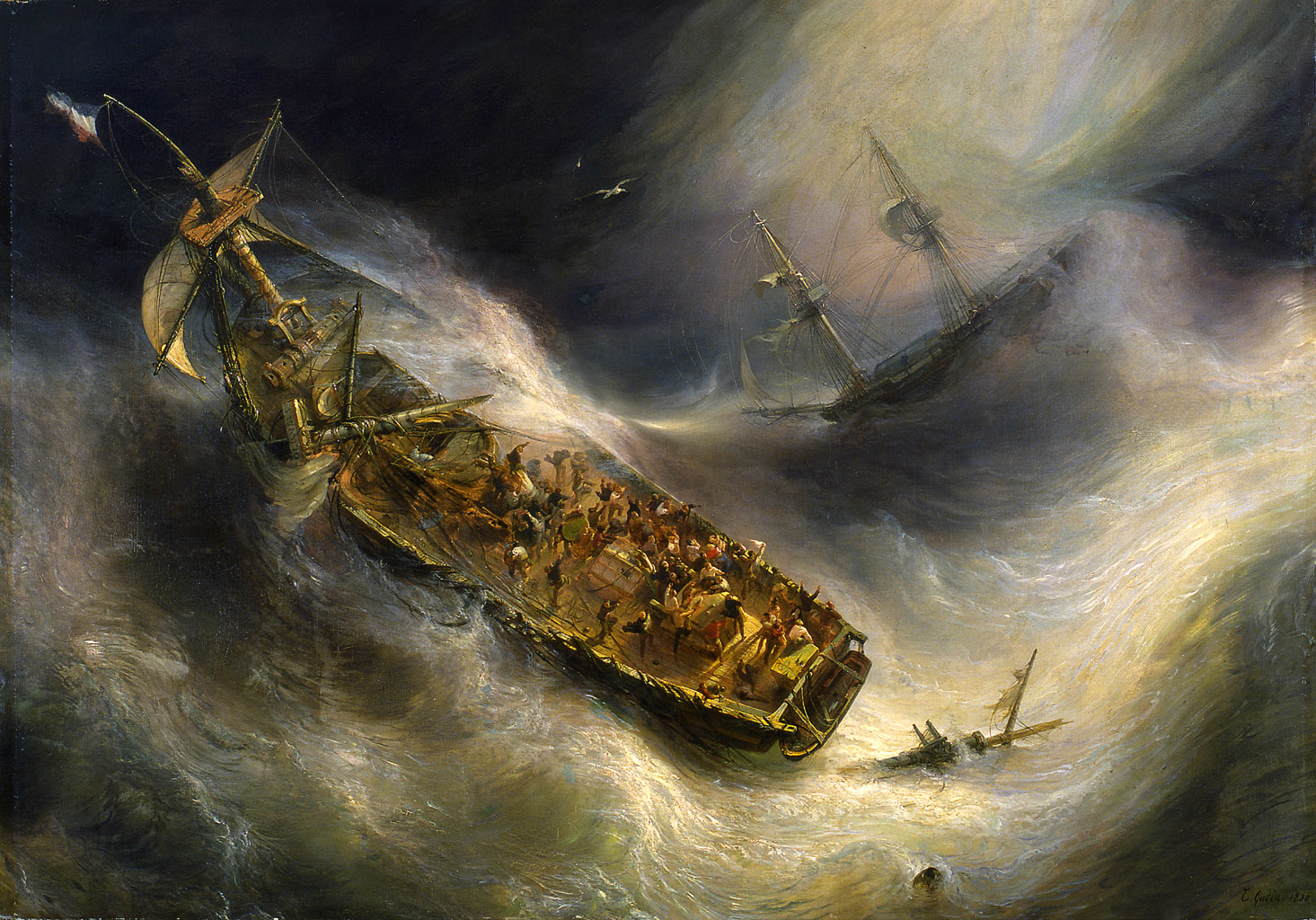
An act of devotion by Captain Desse, of Bordeaux, towards the Columbus, a Dutch ship (1829)

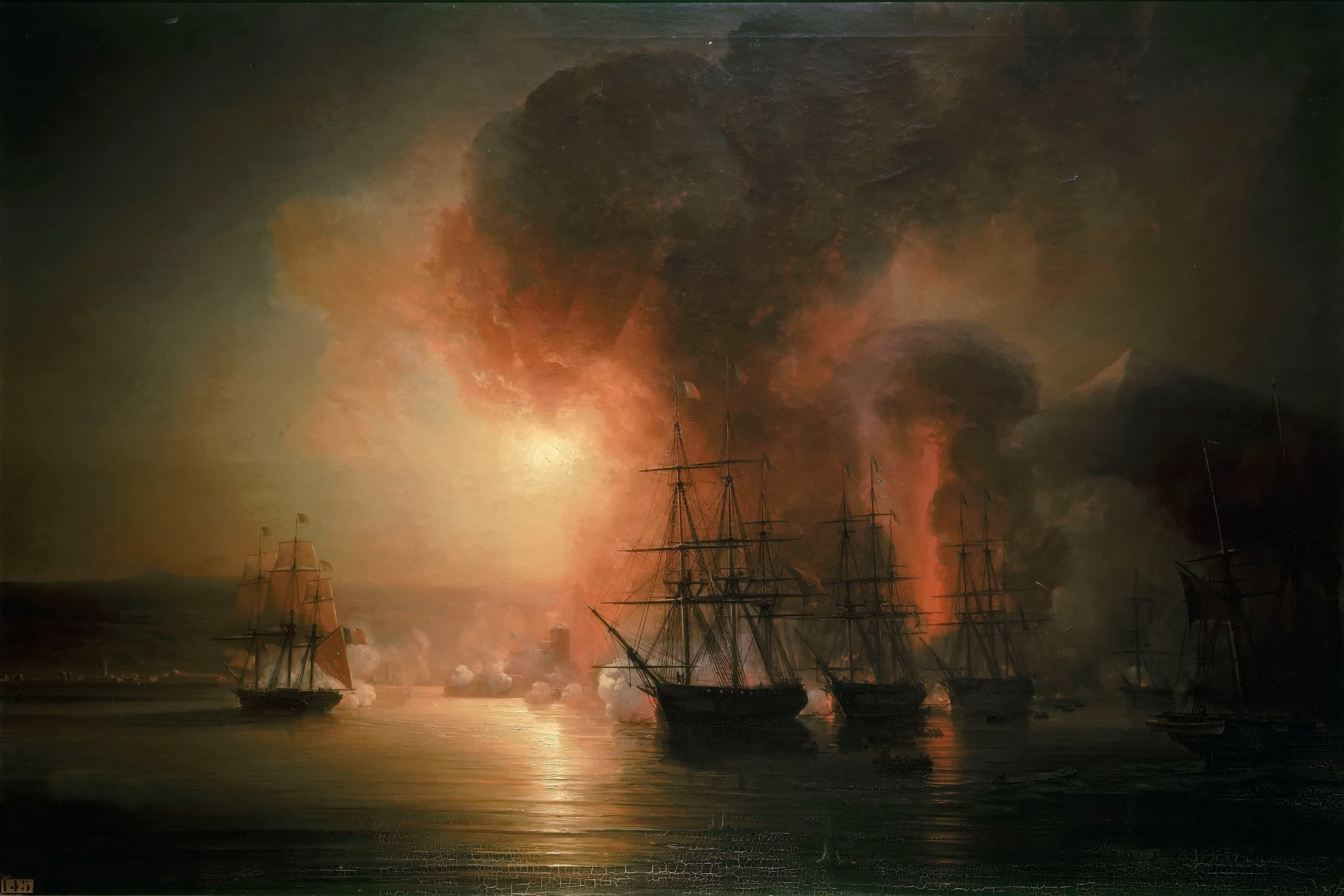
Bombardment of St Jean d Ulloa in 1838 in front of Veracruz (1839)

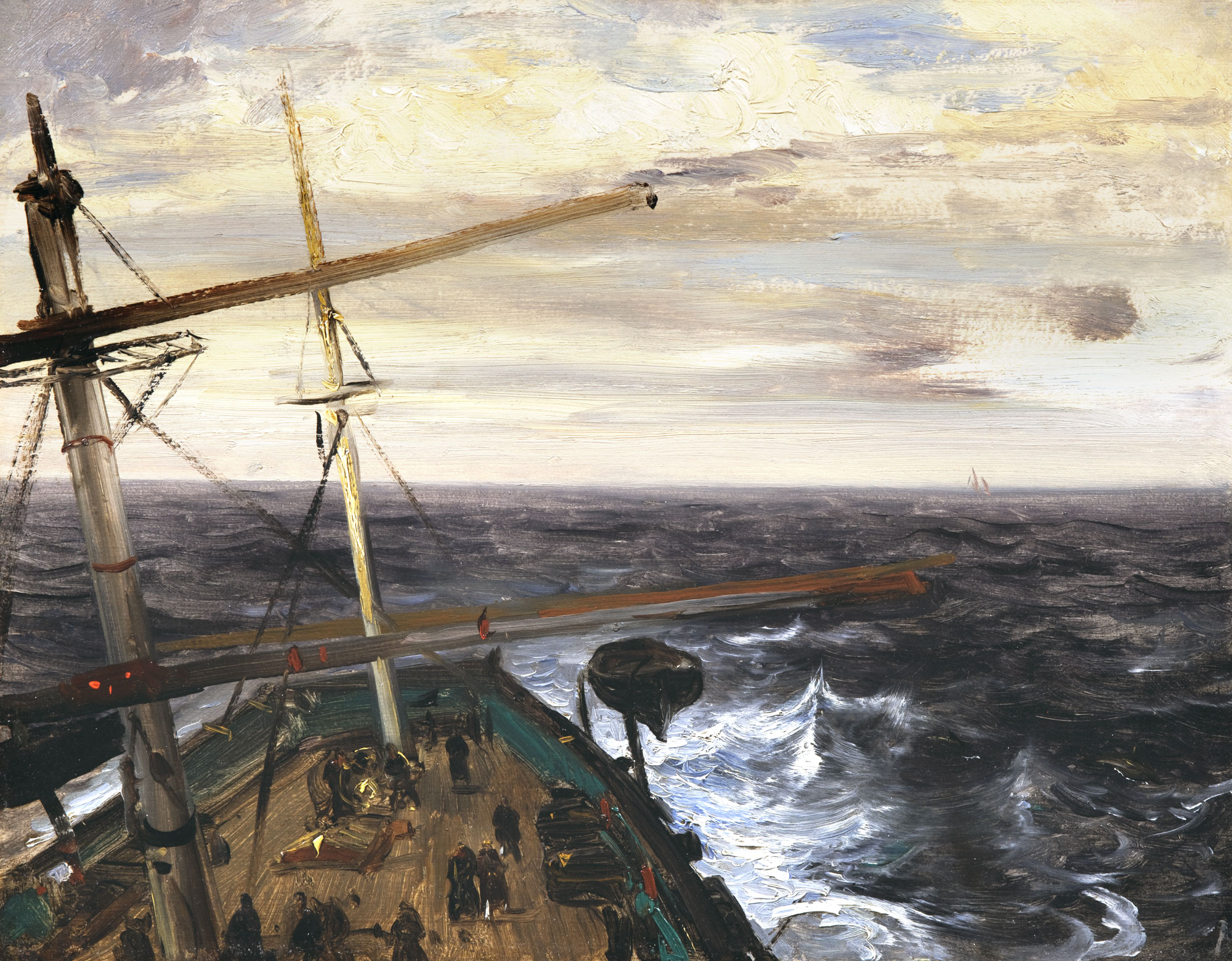
Seascape with a storm as seen from the ship Véloce, 1839 (1839)

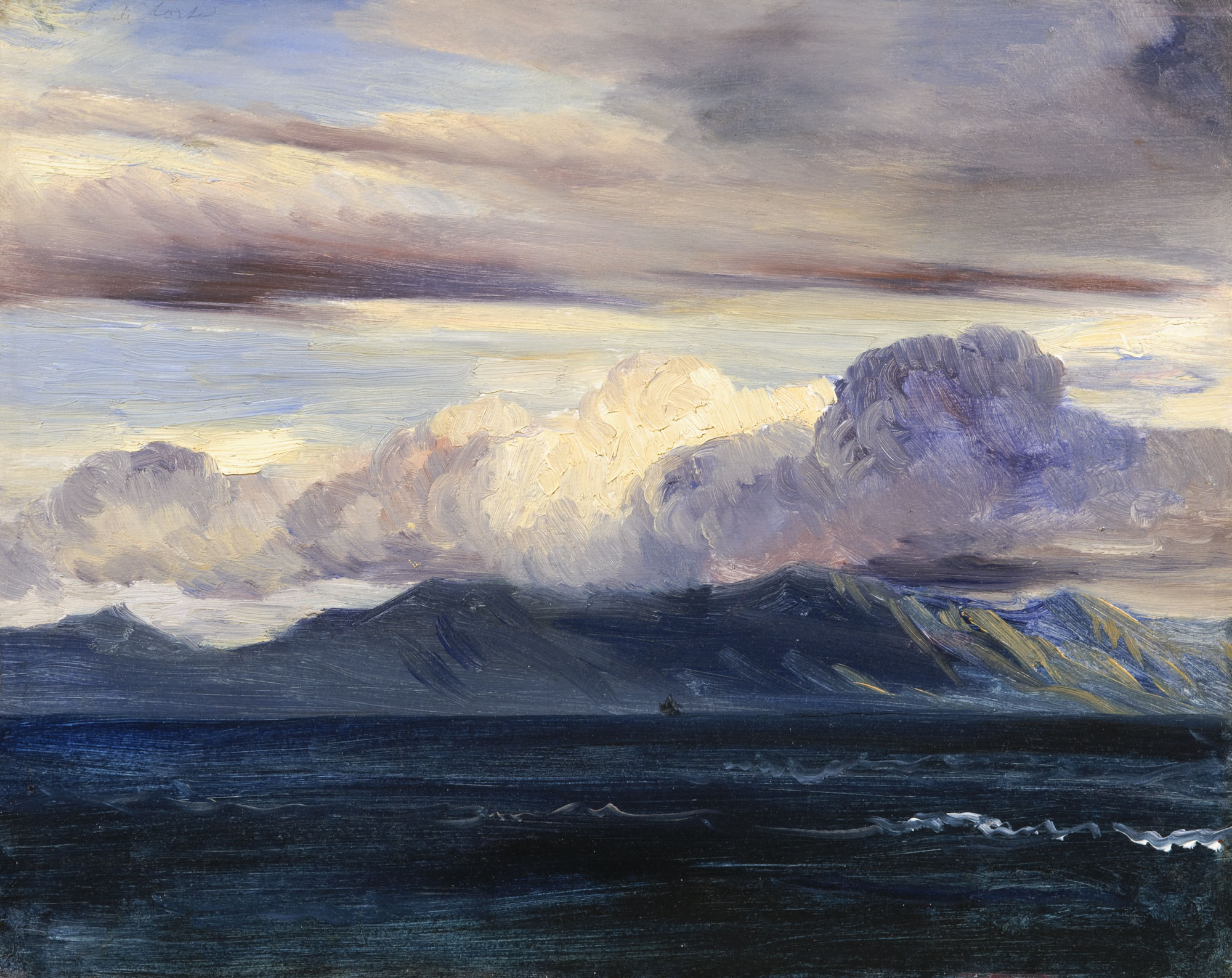
View of Corsica from the ship Véloce (1839)

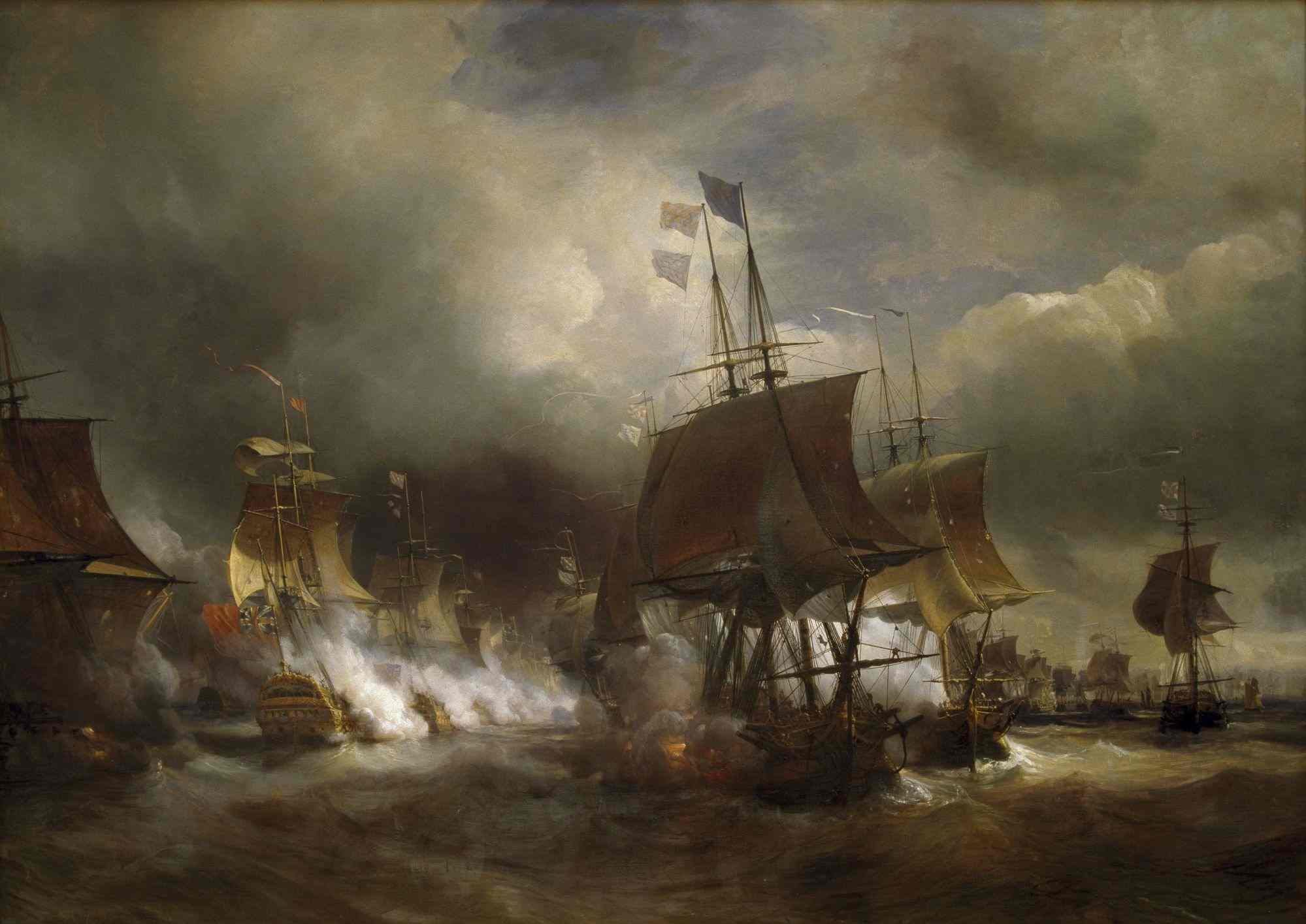
Battle of Ushant, 23 July 1778 (1839)

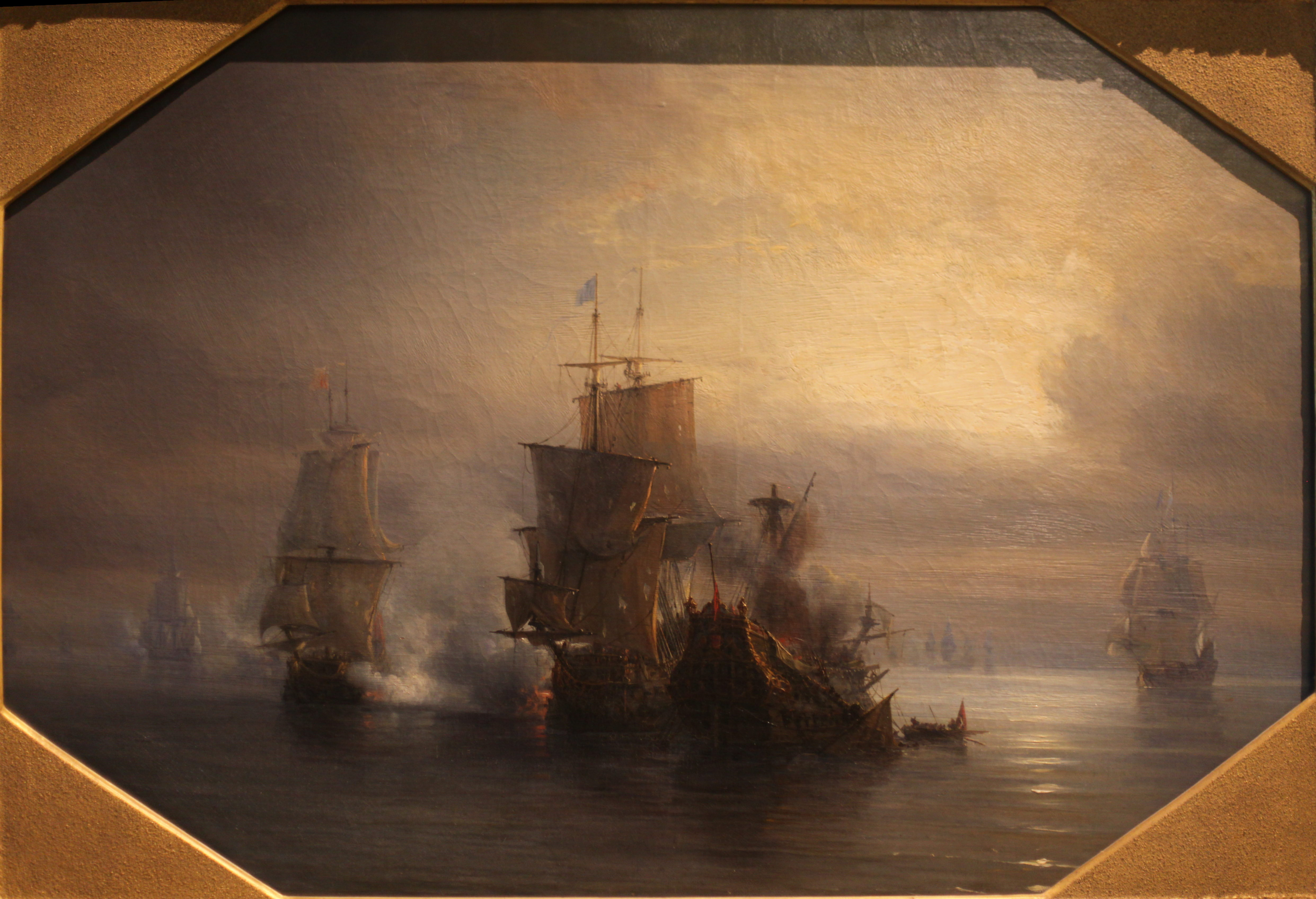
Victory and death of the chevalier of Saint Pol, 31 October 1704 (1839)

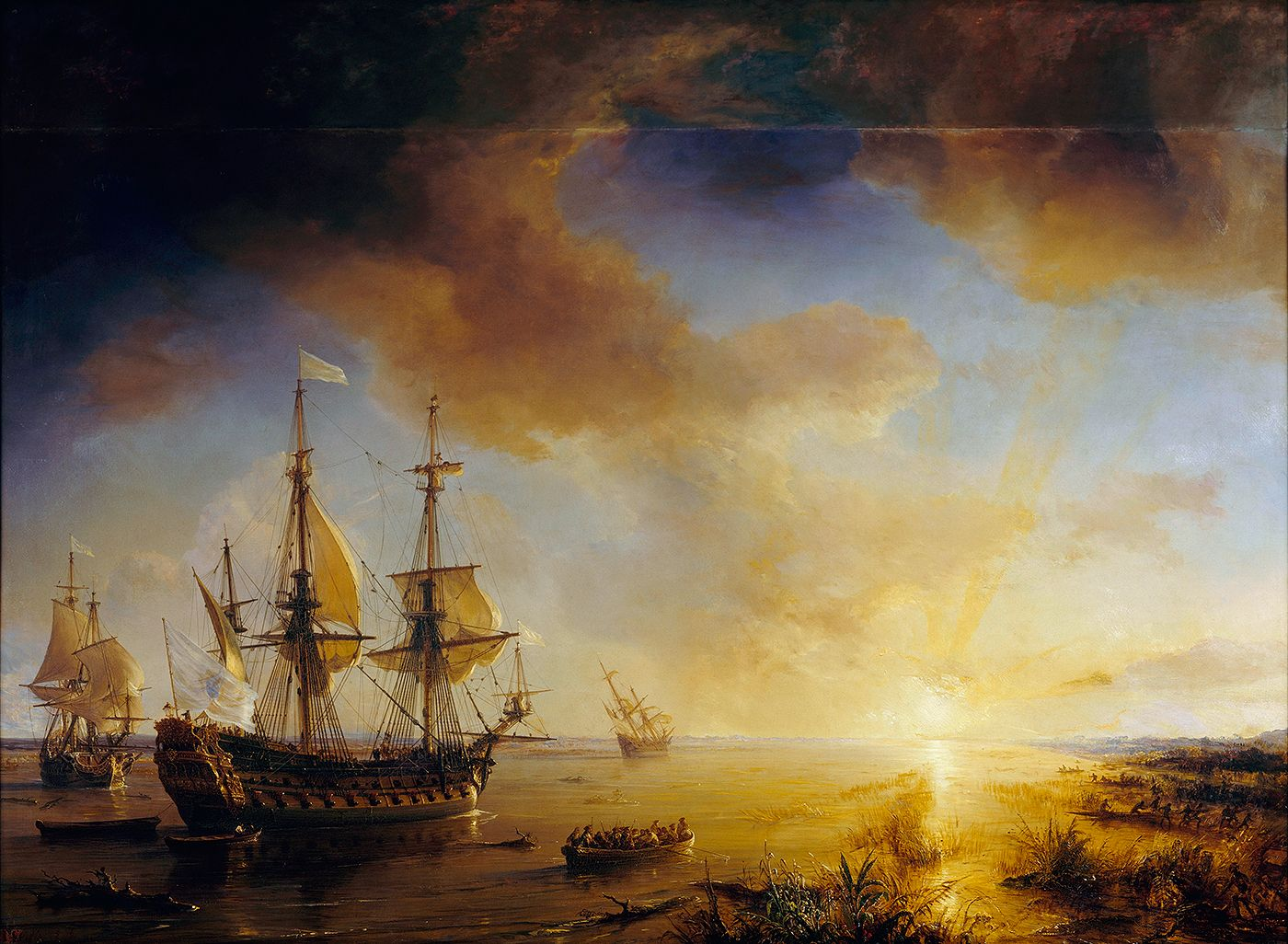
La Salle's Expedition to Louisiana in 1684 (1844)

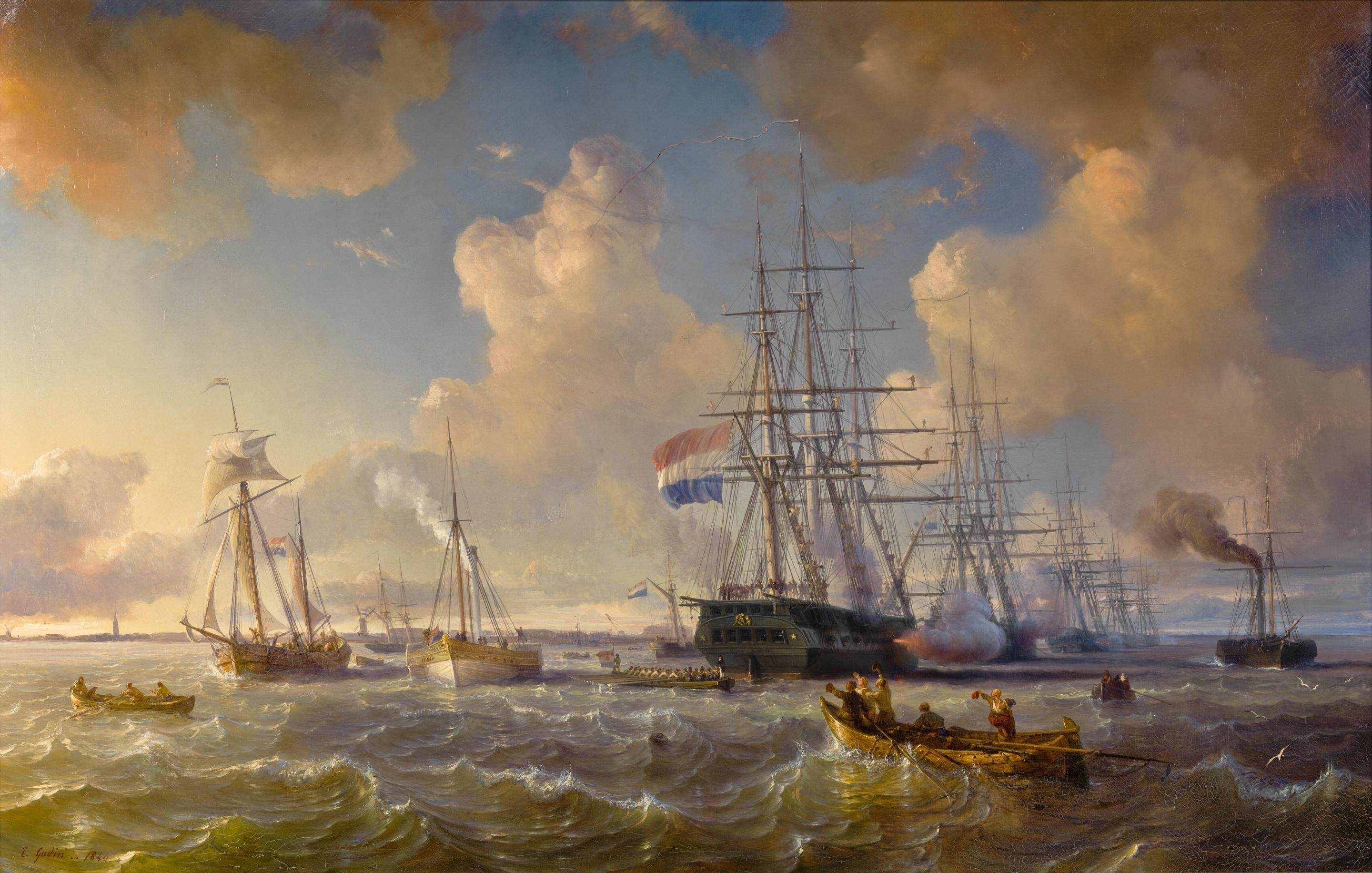
King William II visits the squadron in Vlissingen on 14 July 1843 (1844)

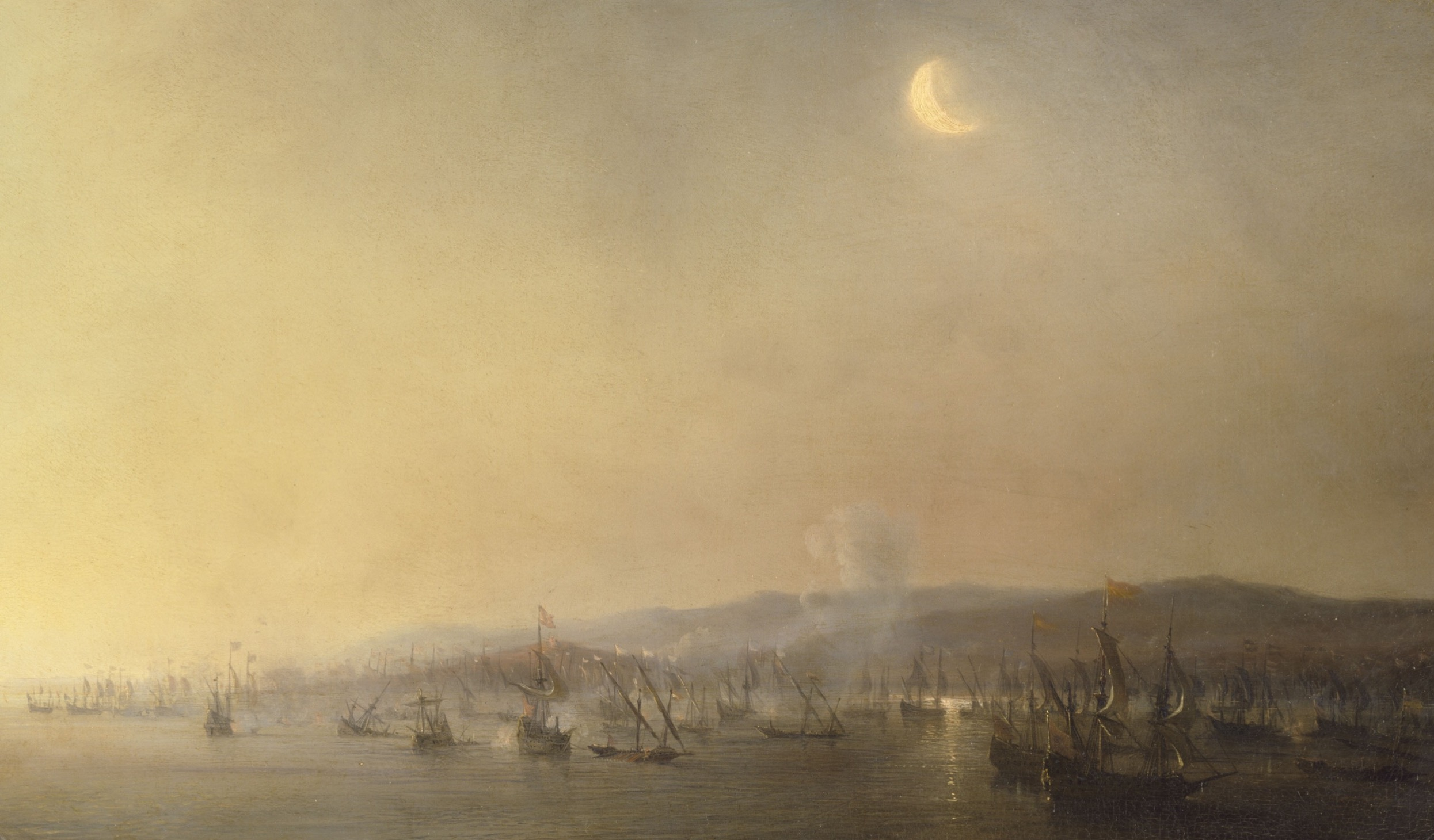
Naval battle of Cartagena on 3 September 1643 (1844)

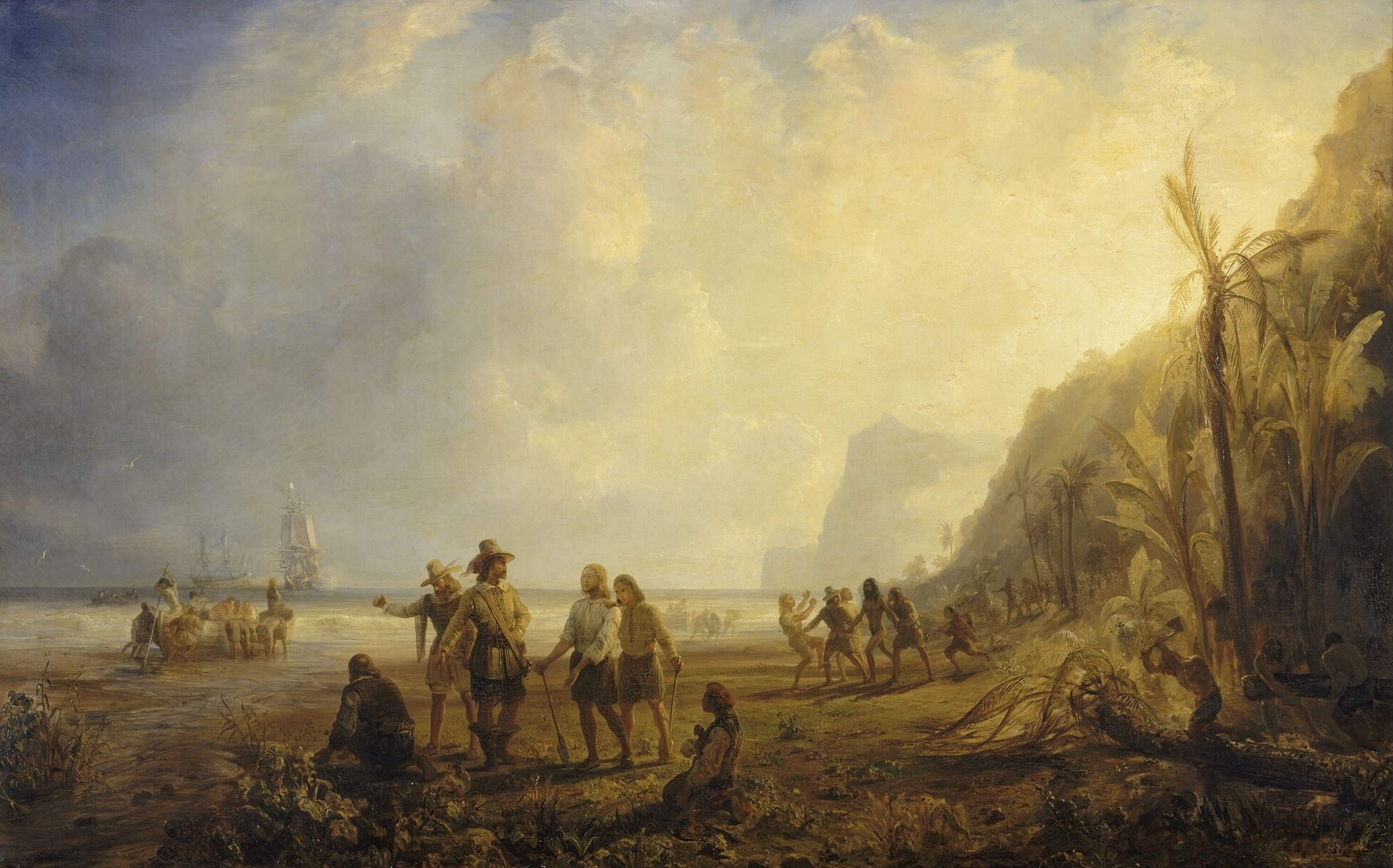
Foundation of The Colony of Martinique, 1635 (1844)

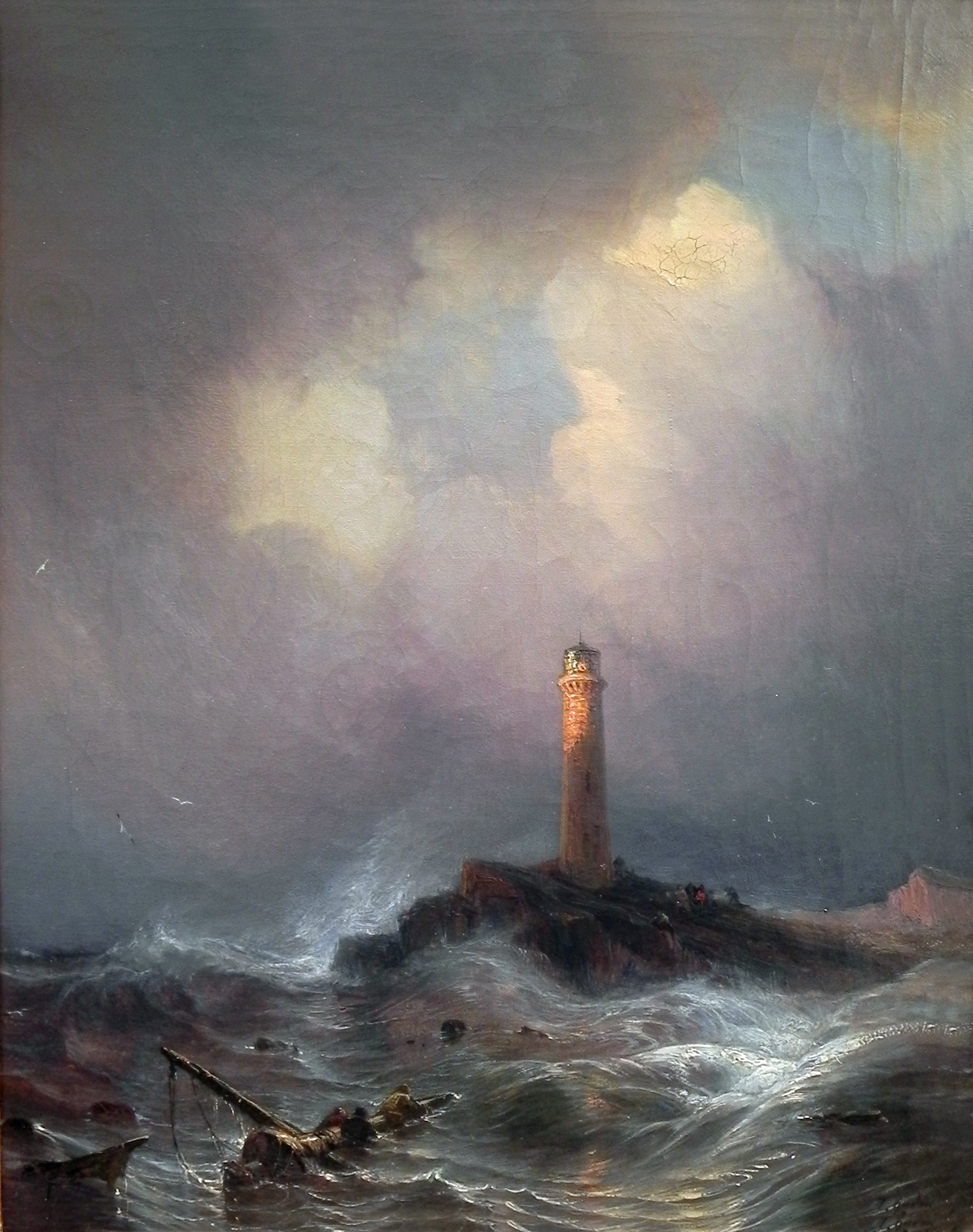
Lighthouse on the Coast of Brittany (1845)

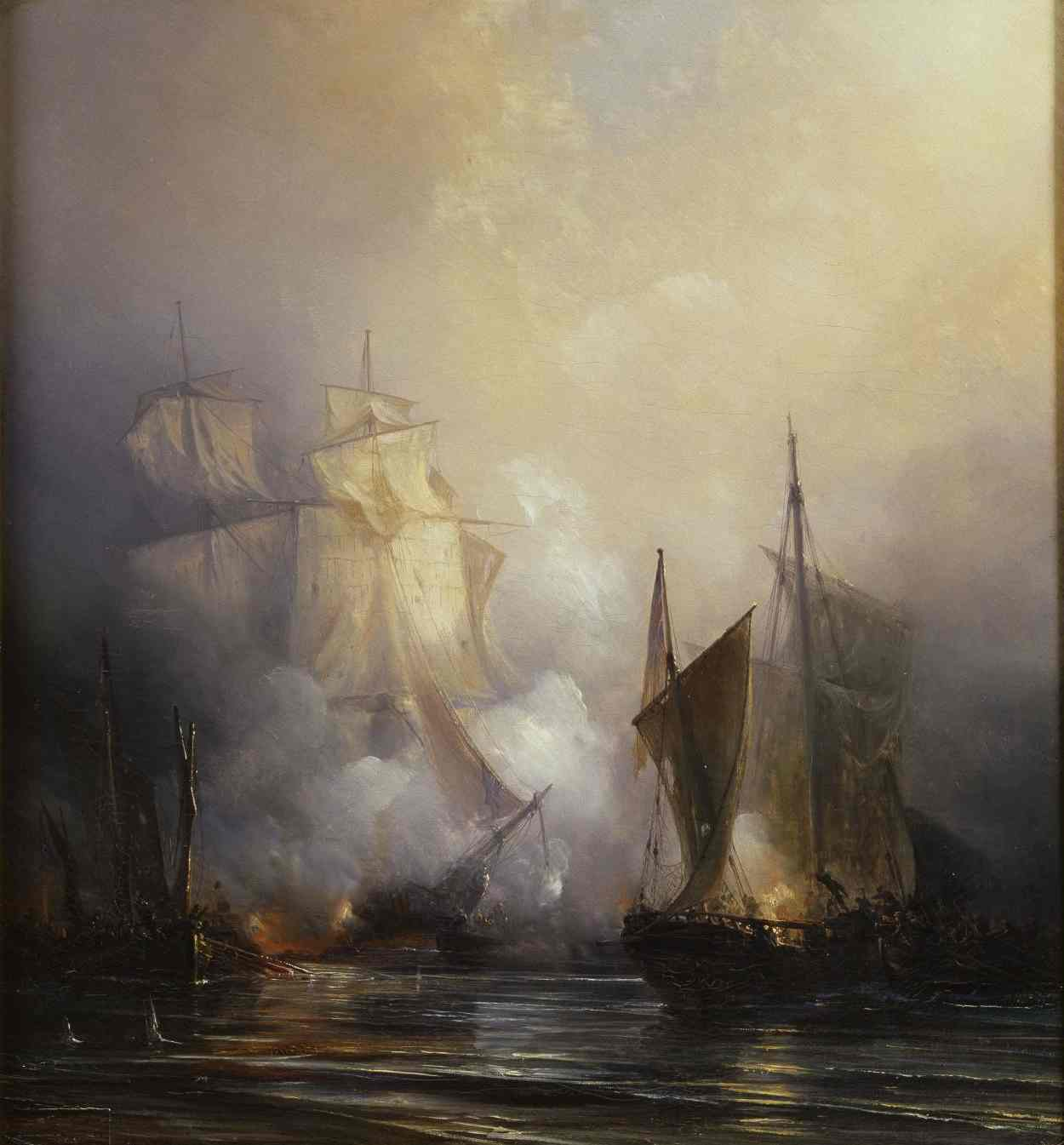
The Poursuivante forcing the Pertuis d'Antioche, 1804 (1848)

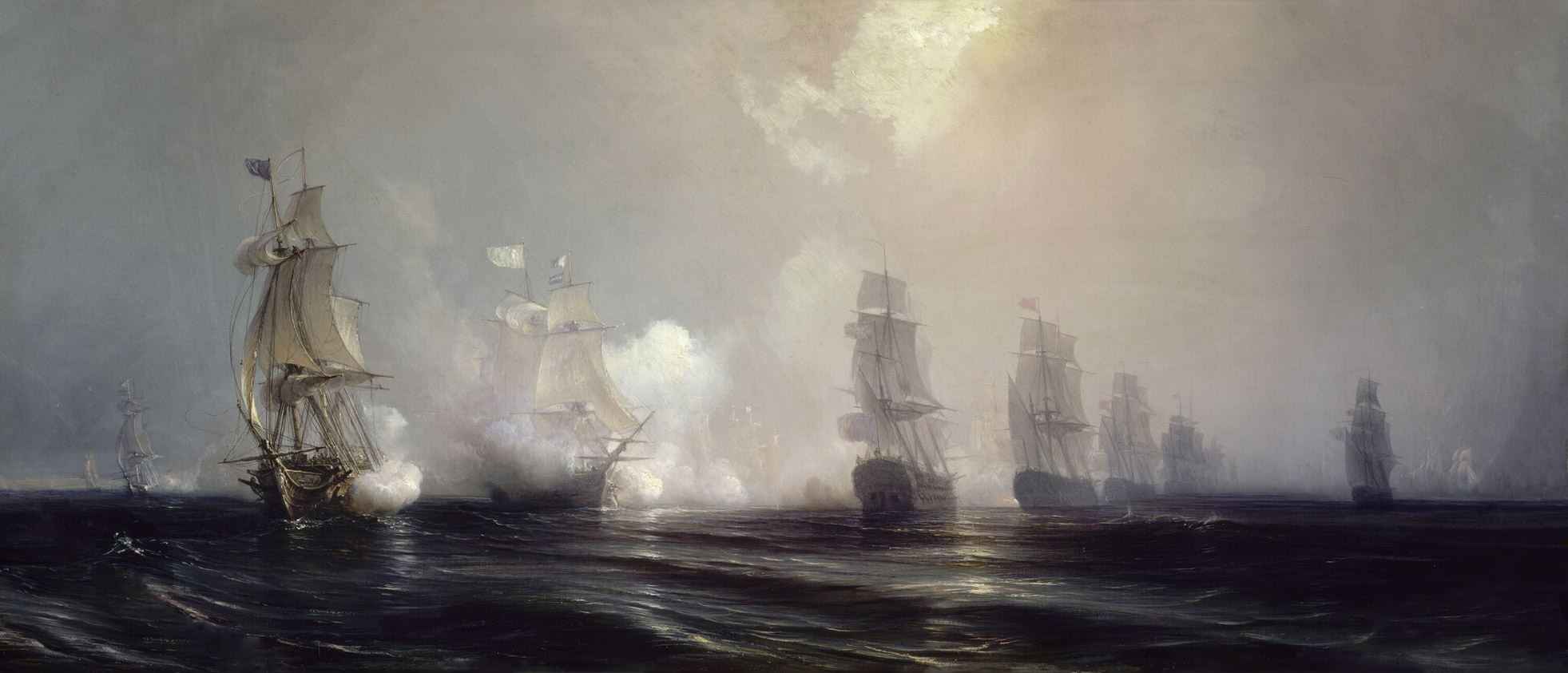
Naval battle off the Chesapeake, 3 September 1781 (Date unknown)

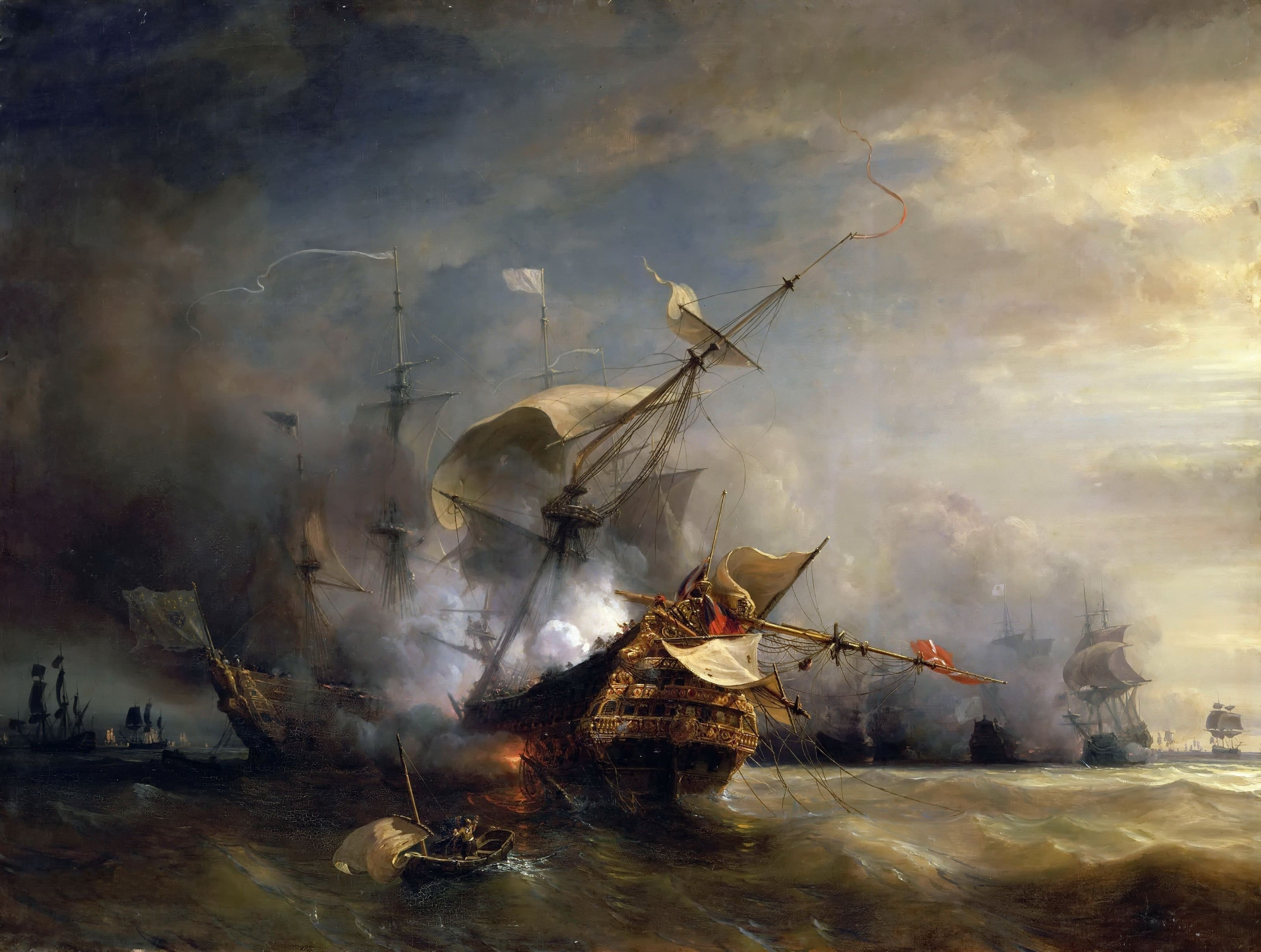
The Naval Battle Near Lizard Point, 1707 (Date unknown)

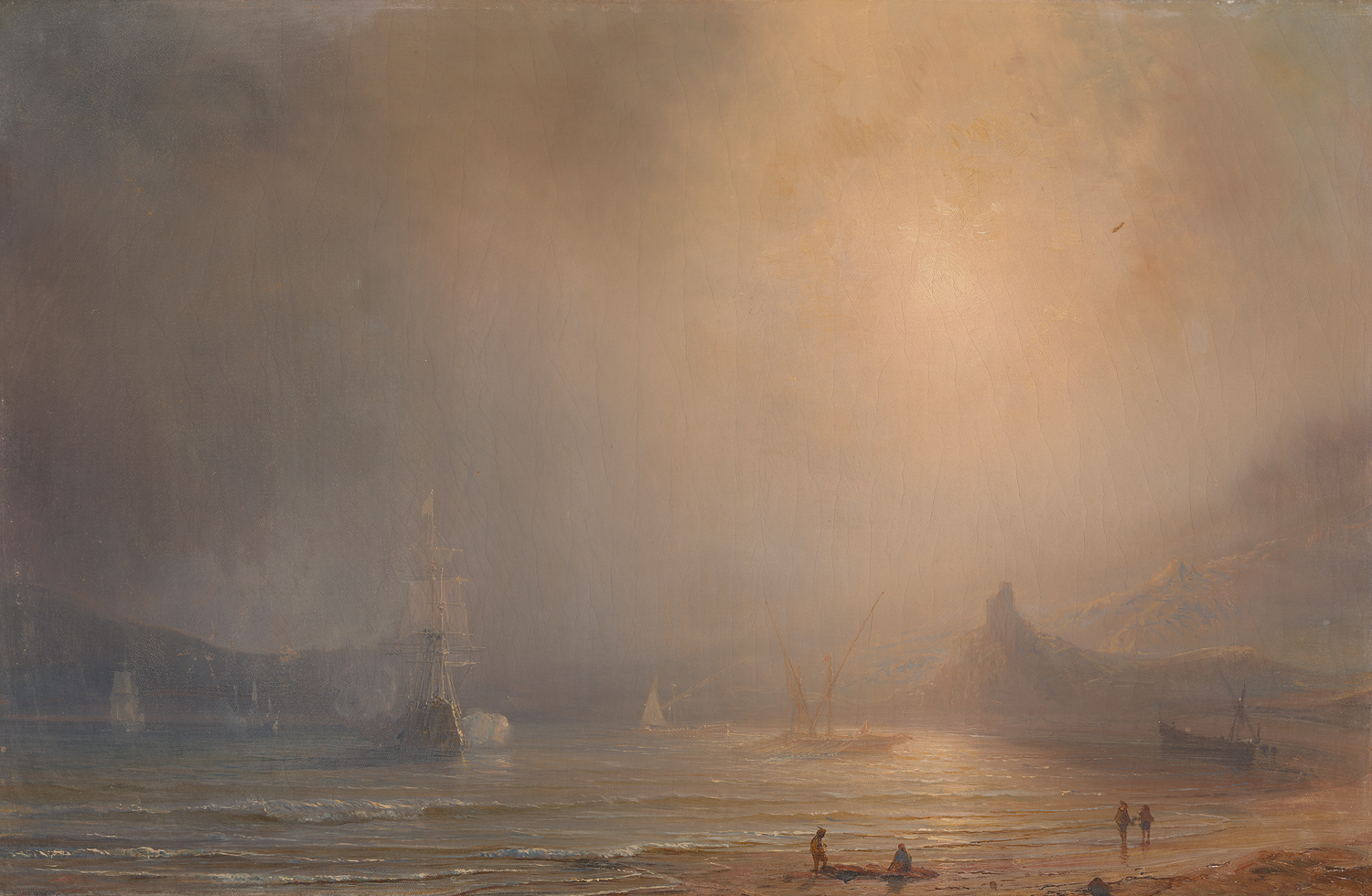
Fog over the Mediterranean Sea (Date unknown)

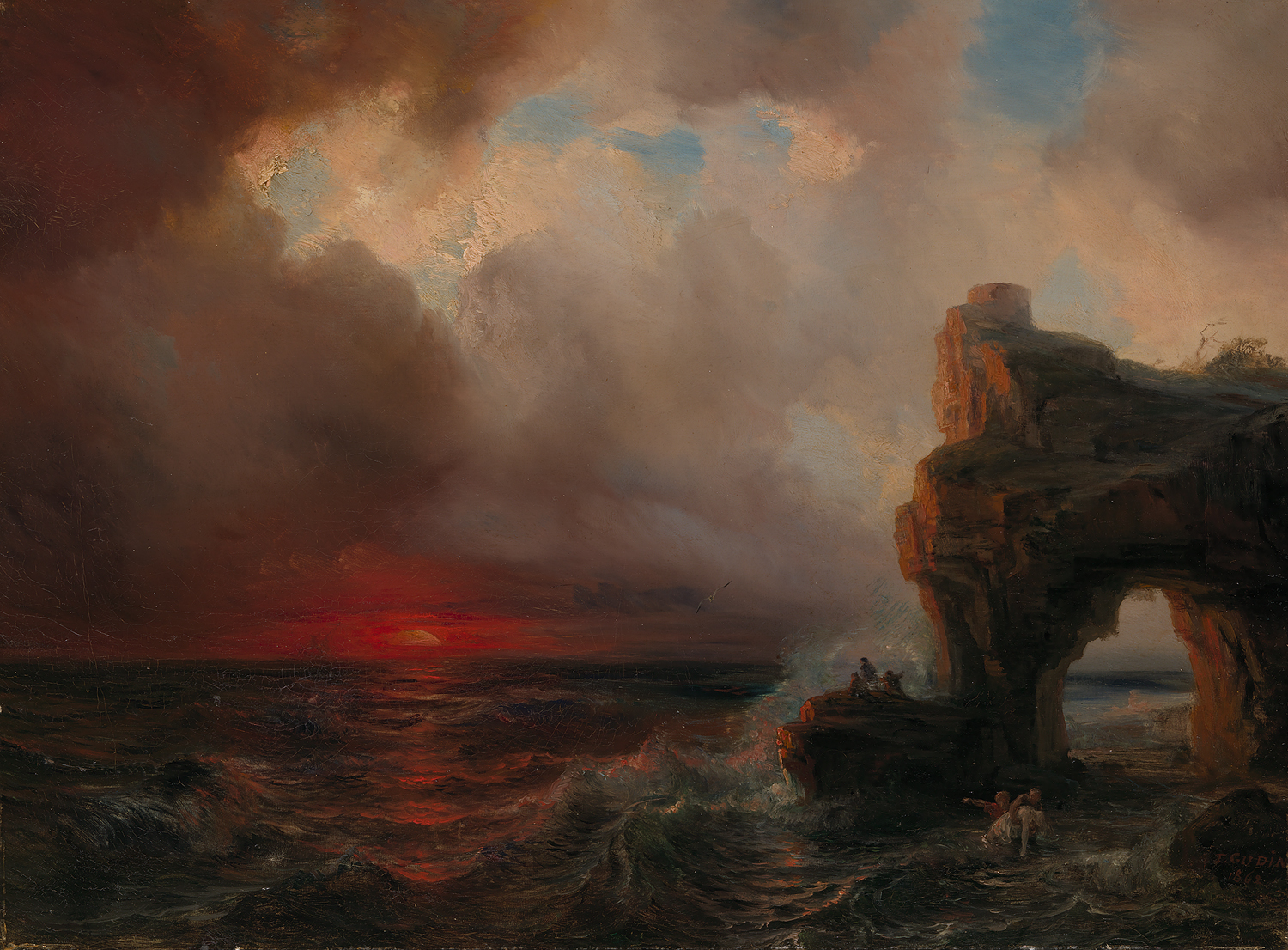
Stormy landscape at sunset (1862)

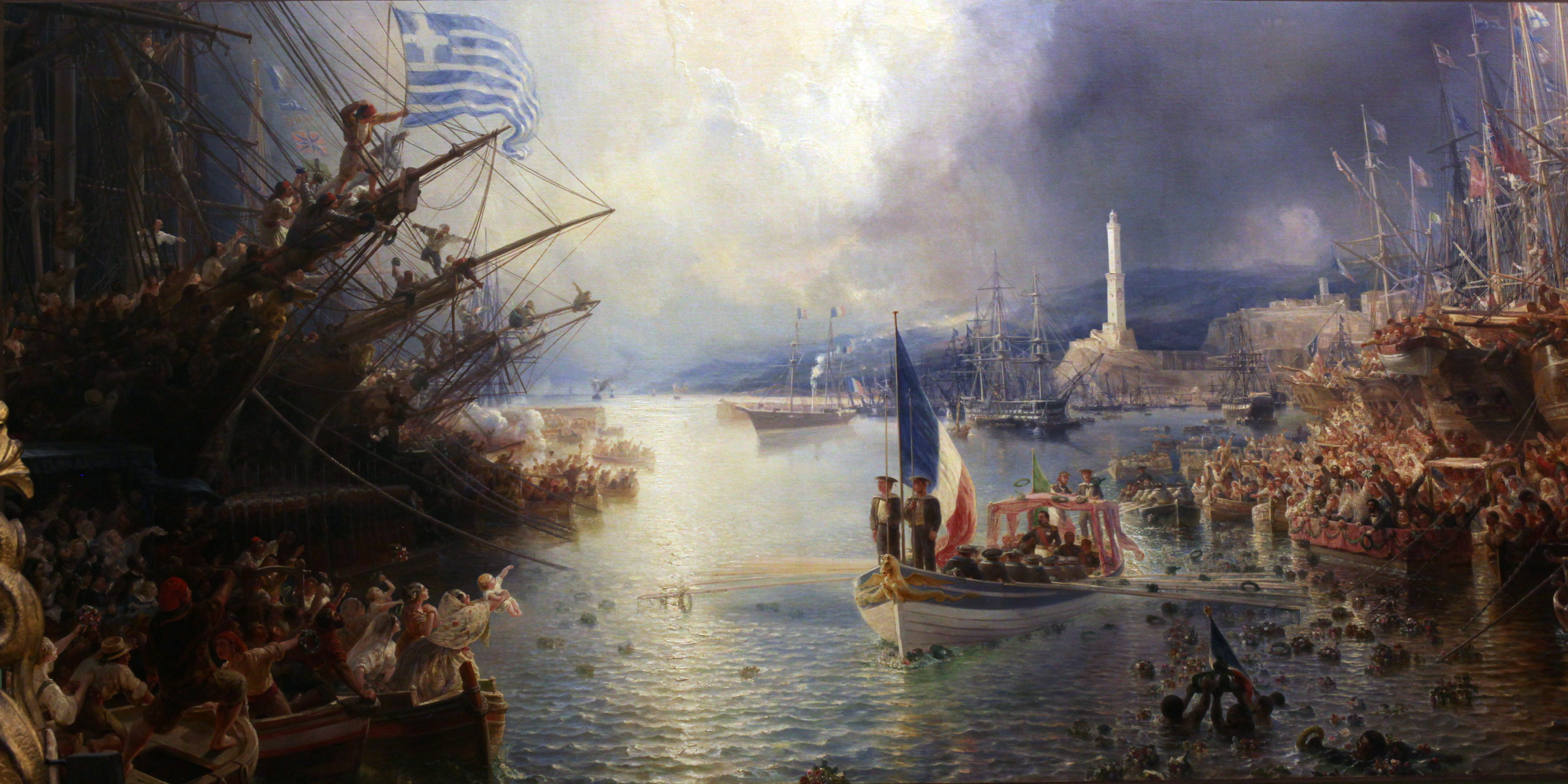
Napoleon III in Genoa (1865)

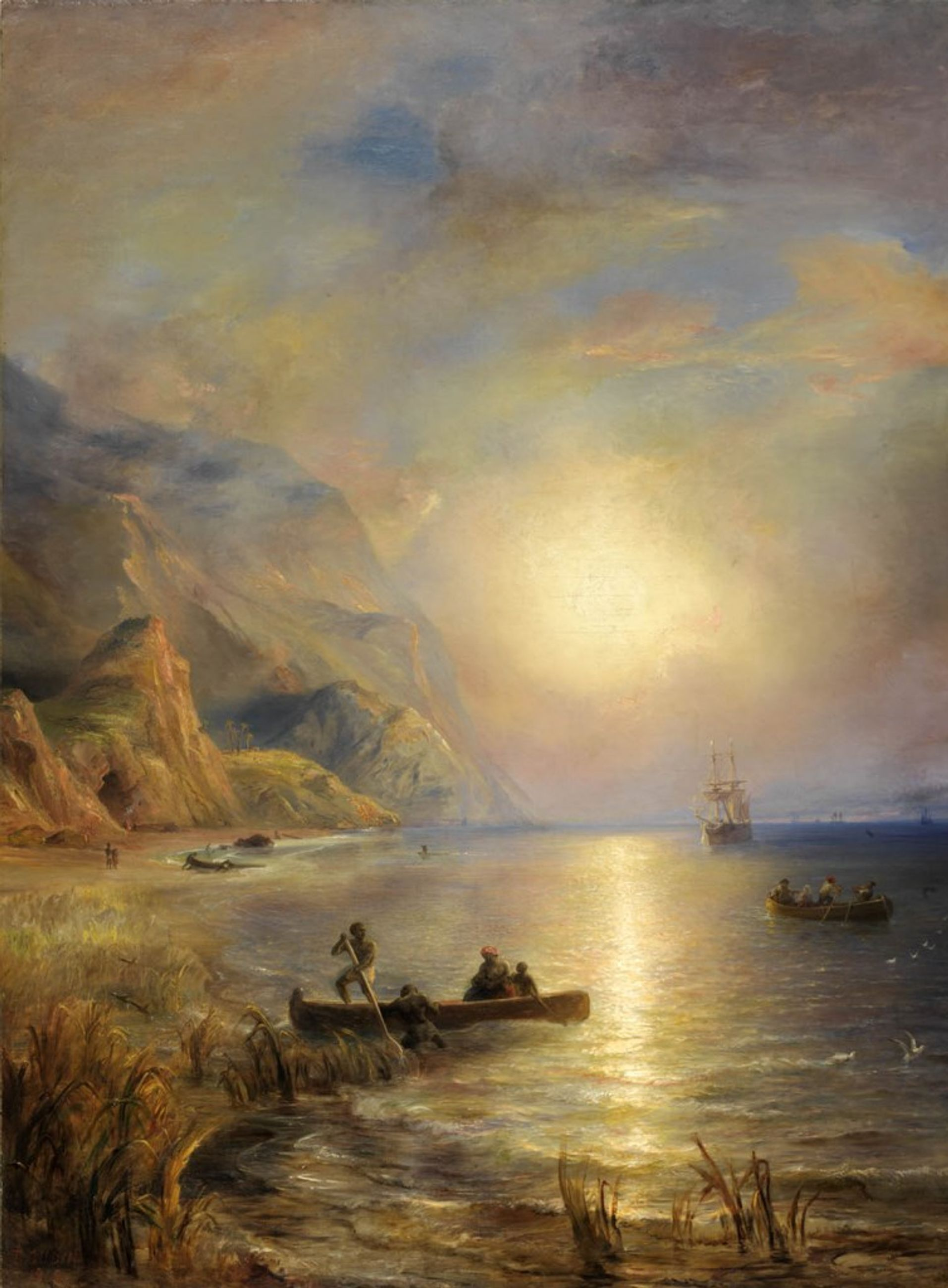
Sunrise over Isle Bourbon (1867)

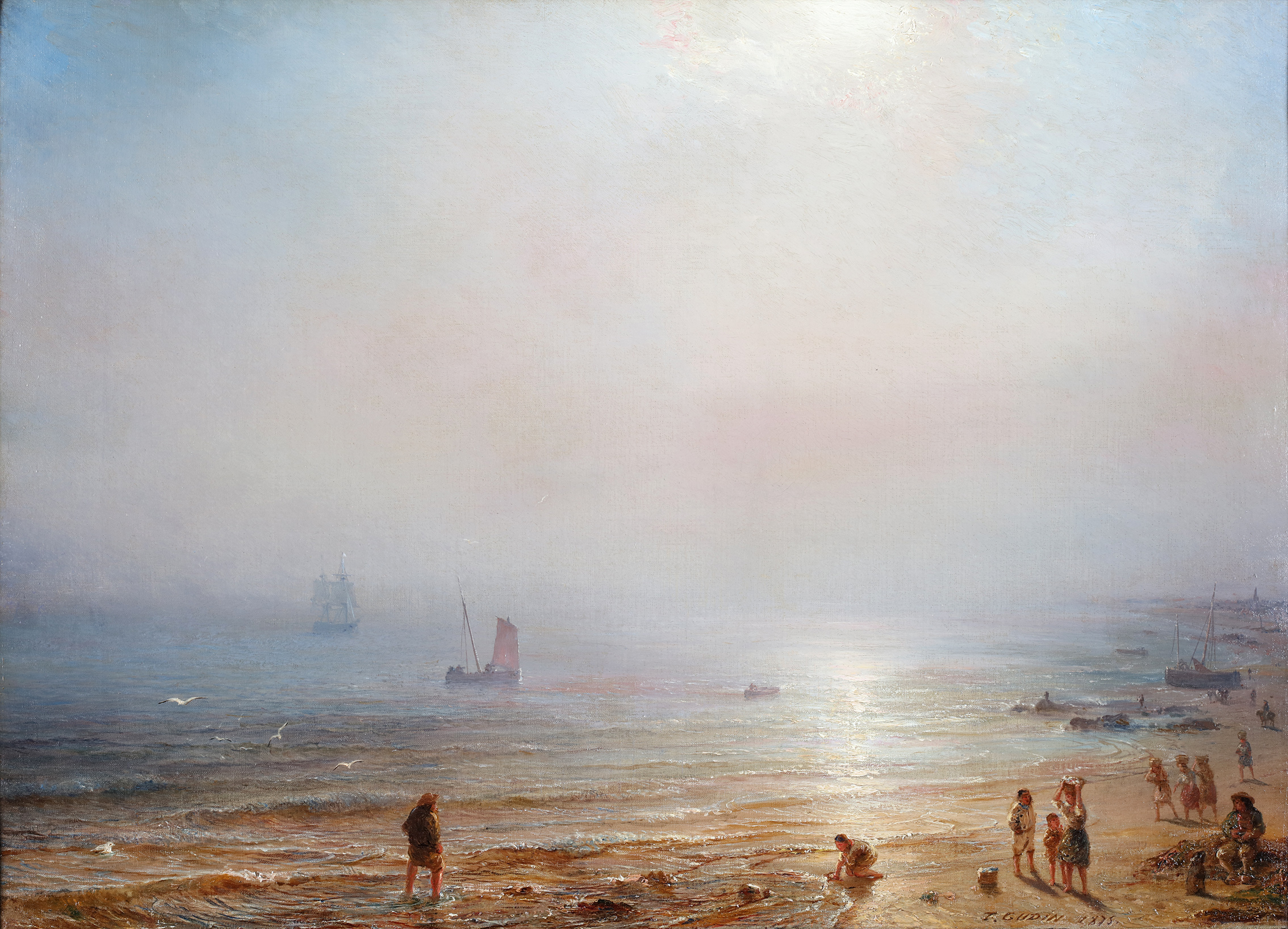
Fisherfolk on the beach (1875)
