= Interstate 69 in Texas =

Interstate Highway in Texas

Interstate 69
- I-69 Future or proposed segments

Route information
- Maintained by TxDOT
- Length: 75.3 mi (121.2 km)
- Existed: 2011–present
- NHS: Entire route

Major junctions
- South end: US 59 / Spur 529 in Rosenberg
- I-45 in Houston; I-10 / US 90 in Houston
- North end: US 59 near Cleveland

Location
- Country: United States
- State: Texas
- Counties: Fort Bend, Harris, Montgomery, Liberty

Highway system
- Interstate Highway System; Main; Auxiliary; Suffixed; Business; Future; Highways in Texas; Interstate; US; State; Former; Toll; Loops; Spurs; FM/RM; Park; Rec
← SH 68	→ I-69C

Interstate 69 (I-69 (Note: Some sources use "IH-69", as "IH" is an abbreviation used by TxDOT for Interstate Highways.)) is an Interstate Highway that is in the process of being built in the U.S. state of Texas. It is part of a longer I-69 extension known as the NAFTA superhighway, that, if fully realized, would connect Canada to Mexico via controlled-access highways. In Texas, it is intended to connect Tenaha and the Louisiana segment of the route through the eastern part of the state and along the Texas Gulf Coast to Victoria, where it would split into three branches: I-69E to Brownsville, I-69C to Pharr, and I-69W to Laredo.

The first segment of I-69 in Texas was opened in 2011 near Corpus Christi. The American Association of State Highway and Transportation Officials (AASHTO) approved an additional 58 miles (93 km) of U.S. Highway 77 (US 77) from Brownsville to the Willacy–Kenedy county line for designation as I-69, which was to be signed as I-69E upon concurrence from the Federal Highway Administration (FHWA). FHWA approval for this segment was announced in 2013. By 2015, a 74.9-mile (120.5 km) section of US 59 had been completed and designated as I-69 through Greater Houston. As of 2024, short segments near the southern termini of the three branch routes (I-69E, I-69C, and I-69W) have also all been completed. These branches are planned to be connected to the rest of Interstate 69.

== Route description ==
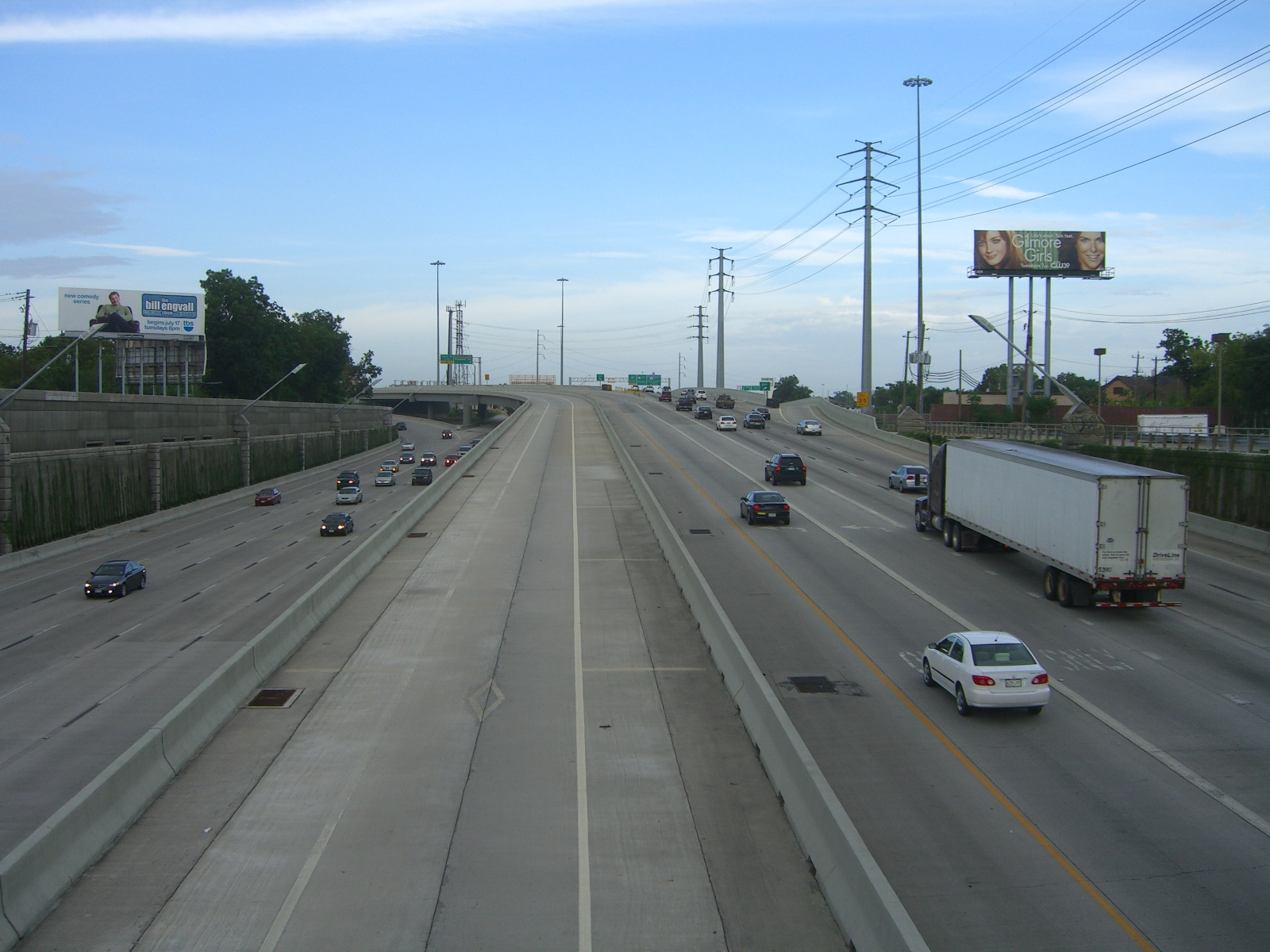
I-69 (along with US 59) in Houston looking east

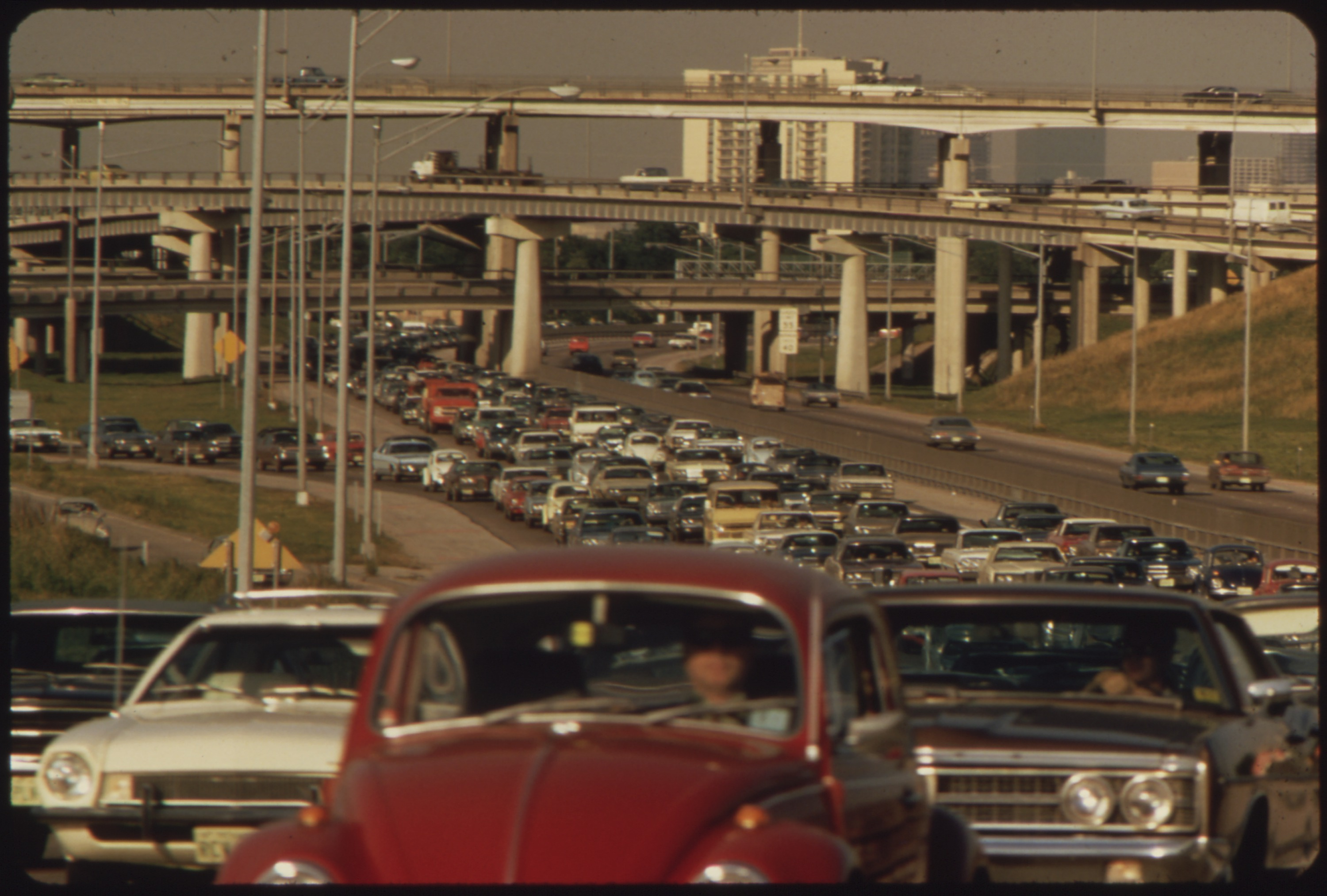
What is now I-69/US 59 (Southwest Freeway) in 1972

Currently, the mainline I-69 begins just south of Rosenberg then continues to Sugar Land before entering through Downtown Houston before exiting through New Caney and ending at Cleveland where the route continues as US 59.

If completed, I-69W and I-69E would merge together just south of Victoria, where mainline I-69 will follow US 59 northeast to Fort Bend County. In Greater Houston, I-69 follows US 59 (Southwest Freeway) from Fort Bend County to the west loop of I-610. I-69 then follows US 59 (Eastex Freeway) from the north loop of I-610 to the Montgomery–Liberty county line.

From Houston, I-69 is intended to follow US 59 to the north, serving Cleveland, Shepherd, Livingston, Lufkin, Nacogdoches, and Tenaha. From Tenaha, the I-69 mainline would head east into Louisiana along the US 84 corridor. In Texas, an Interstate route designated I-369 would proceed north along US 59 from Tenaha to Texarkana. I-69 was originally planned to go to Carthage then leave US 59 to head in an east direction into Louisiana.

== History ==
=== Funding schemes ===
Texas originally sought a public–private partnership to construct much of the route through Texas as a privately operated toll road under the failed Trans-Texas Corridor project. On June 26, 2008, however, TxDOT announced that they had approved a proposal by Zachry American and ACS Group to develop the I-69 corridor in Texas, beginning with upgrades to the US 77 corridor between Brownsville and I-37; the Zachry American/ACS Group plan calls for the majority of the freeway to be toll-free; the only two tolled sections would be bypasses of Riviera and Driscoll.

=== Route designation intrigue ===
The federal legislation designating the south Texas branches as I-69 suggested that these routes may be designated as "I-69E" (east, following US 77), "I-69C" (central, following US 281), and "I-69W" (west, following US 59). The AASHTO Special Committee on Route Numbering rejected the Texas Department of Transportation (TxDOT)'s request for these three designations along the proposed I-69 branches, citing that AASHTO policy no longer allows Interstate Highways to be signed as suffixed routes. Stating that the I-69E, I-69C, and I-69W designations for the three I-69 branches south of Victoria were written into federal law, the initial denial of TxDOT's applications were subsequently overturned by the AASHTO Standing Committee on Highways, and the approval for the I-69E, I-69C, and I-69W branch designations were confirmed by the AASHTO Board of Directors, pending concurrence from the FHWA during the AASHTO Spring Meeting on May 7, 2013. During this same meeting, the section of US 83 between Harlingen and Peñitas was conditionally approved to be designated as I-2, with FHWA concurrence. The US 83 freeway in south Texas was widely anticipated to receive an I-X69 designation instead of I-2. In any case, Texas is proceeding in the same fashion as Indiana, conducting environmental studies for its portion of I-69 in a two-tier process. The mainline route through Texas will be approximately 500 miles (800 km). On June 11, 2008, TxDOT announced they planned to limit further study of I-69 to existing highway corridors (US 59, US 77, US 84, US 281, and State Highway 44 [SH 44]) outside transition zones in the lower Rio Grande Valley, Laredo, Houston, and Texarkana.

Original plans for the route included a potential overlap with the "TTC-35" corridor component as well, but the preferred alternative for that component follows I-35 south of San Antonio instead of entering the Lower Rio Grande Valley.

TxDOT submitted an application to the FHWA and AASHTO to designate 75 miles (121 km) of US 59 in the Houston area and eight miles (13 km) of US 77 near Corpus Christi as I-69, as these sections are already built to Interstate standards and connect to other Interstate Highways. In August 2011, TxDOT received approval from the FHWA for a six-mile (9.7 km) segment of US 77 between I-37 and SH 44 near Corpus Christi and was approved by AASHTO in October 2011. Officials held a ceremony on December 5, 2011, to unveil I-69 signs on the Robstown–Corpus Christi section. On May 29, 2013, the Robstown–Corpus Christi section of I-69 was resigned as I-69E.

At the May 18, 2012, AASHTO meeting, 35 miles (56 km) of US 59 (Eastex Freeway) from I-610 in Houston (on the loop's northern segment) to Fostoria Road in Liberty County were also approved as ready for I-69 signage, pending concurrence from the FHWA. The FHWA later granted concurrence and with the final approval of the Texas Transportation Commission, the 35-mile (56 km) stretch was officially designated as I-69. It was announced on February 6, 2013, that the FHWA had approved a 28.4-mile (45.7 km) segment of US 59 (Southwest Freeway) from I-610 in Houston (on the loop's western segment) to just southwest of Rosenberg; the transportation commission gave final approval later that month and signage was erected on April 3, 2013. The remaining segment of the original 75-mile (121 km) submission (the section within Houston between the northern and western sections of I-610) was approved for designation as I-69 by the FHWA on March 9, 2015, and approved for signage as I-69 by the transportation commission on March 25, 2015.

On May 29, 2013, the transportation commission gave approval to naming completed Interstate-standard segments of US 77 and US 281 as I-69. On July 15, 2013, the Interstate markers were unveiled. US 77 through Cameron and Willacy counties are signed as I-69E. That includes 53 miles (85 km) of existing freeway starting at the international boundary in the middle of the Rio Grande in Brownsville and running north past Raymondville. The 13 miles (21 km) of US 281 freeway in Pharr and Edinburg are signed as I-69C.

On November 20, 2014, the transportation commission voted to add two new sections totaling 6.1 miles (9.8 km) to I-69 in south Texas. The first section is 1.6 miles (2.6 km) of newly finished freeway near Robstown in Nueces County and was co-designated as I-69E/US 77, and the second section is a 4.5-mile (7.2 km) section of new freeway on the north side of Edinburg in Hidalgo County which was codesignated as I-69C/US 281. The segment of US 59 inside the I-610 loop, through Downtown Houston, was approved for designation as I-69 by the FHWA on March 9, 2015, and approved for signage as I-69 by the Texas Transportation Commission on March 25, 2015. The designations were approved by the FHWA and by AASHTO making a total of 192 miles (309 km) of I-69 in Texas (including I-2).

On May 24, 2019, both the Texas House of Representatives and Senate approved a 10-year extension of highway funding needed for I-69.

=== Improvements in the teens and twenties ===
Since July 2011, Texas has been proceeding with upgrading rural sections of US 59, US 77, and US 281 to Interstate standards by replacing intersections with interchanges and converting two-lane stretches to four lanes by adding a second roadway to the existing roadway and adding one-way frontage roads.

The extension of the southern terminus of the I-69 designation to the Fort Bend–Wharton county line, and the extension of the northern terminus to Cleveland, were completed after several years of delays, and the designation approved by AASHTO in 2024.

Although the Riggs Cemetery, established in 1892, lies in the path of the freeway in Liberty County, TxDOT is choosing to preserve it. Work to extend I-69 northward to Shepherd and south to Victoria are in various stages of planning, development, design, and construction.

=== Future timeline uncertainties ===
As of 2022, there is no timeline of when I-69 in Texas will be completed as there is no funding to complete it entirely. Various portions of US 59 are being upgraded to Interstate standards to be eligible for an I-69 designation with some bypasses being constructed at smaller towns. Construction on building a new alignment in Nacogdoches to bypass the existing US 59 at Loop 224 interchange began in 2019 and is scheduled to be completed by 2026, after delays attributed to supply chain issues. TxDOT held a public meeting on August 3, 2023, on the planned $115-million reconfiguration of the US 59 and US 259/Business US 59-F interchange just north of Nacogdoches, although construction is not scheduled to start until 2029. TxDOT discussed about one year after their last public meeting and negotiated on how the horseshoe-style intersection would be removed with the addition of more flyover bridges. Construction in the area is not expected to be funded until 2034.

Currently, a bypass for Diboll is under construction and is scheduled for completion in 2025, with northbound lanes opening in May 2025. On May 25, 2023, US 59 was redesignated on the unfinished bypass, with the former alignment becoming Bus. US 59-H. The bypass for Corrigan started construction in late 2022 and is scheduled for completion in 2028.

== Exit list ==
County	Location	mi	km	Exit	Destinations	Notes
Gap in route
Wharton	Louise	51.0	82.1	51	US 59 south – Victoria	I-69 will continue south along US 59 to Victoria
Wharton	Louise	52.0	83.7	52	FM 647	
Wharton	Louise	54.0	86.9	54	FM 1160	
Wharton	Hillje	57.0	91.7	57	FM 441	
Wharton		58.0	93.3	58	CR 357	
Wharton	El Campo	59.0	95.0	59	CR 355	
Wharton	El Campo	60.0	96.6	60	FM 1163	
Wharton	El Campo	61.0	98.2	61	SH 71 – El Campo, Palacios	
Wharton	El Campo	62.0	99.8	62	FM 1162	
Wharton	El Campo	64.0	103.0	64	FM 960	
Wharton	Pierce	66.0	106.2	66	Loop 526 – Pierce	
Wharton		68.0	109.4	68	Wharton Municipal Airport Road	
Wharton	Wharton	70.0	112.7	70	FM 961	
Wharton	Wharton	71.0	114.3	71	Pump Station Road	No northbound exit
Wharton	Wharton	72.0	115.9	72	FM 102 – Wharton, Eagle Lake	
Wharton		75.0	120.7	75	Bus. US 59-R / SH 60 – Wharton, Bay City	Partially completed; to be southbound exit only and northbound entrance only; under reconstruction
Wharton	Hungerford	77.0	123.9	77	FM 1161 – Spanish Camp	Partially completed; redesign interchange; under reconstruction
Wharton	Hungerford	79.0	127.1	79	Bus. US 59-R – Hungerford	Under construction
Wharton		82.0	132.0	82	CR 212	Under construction
Fort Bend	Kendleton	83.0	133.6	83	FM 2919 – Kendleton	Awaiting approval for I-69 desigination.
Fort Bend	Kendleton	86.0	138.4	86	Loop 541 (Doris Road) – Kendleton	Awaiting approval for I-69 designation
Fort Bend	Beasley	89.0	143.2	89	FM 360 / Loop 540 – Needville	Awaiting approval for I-69 designation
Fort Bend	Beasley	90.0	144.8	90	Isleib Road	Awaiting approval for I-69 designation
Fort Bend	Beasley	92.0	148.1	92	Loop 540 / Daily Road / Hamlink Road	Southbound exit only; awaiting approval for I-69 designation
Fort Bend	Rosenberg	93.0	149.7	93	Spur 10 (Hartledge Road / Stade Road)	Awaiting approval for I-69 designation
Fort Bend	Rosenberg	94.0	151.3	94	Spur 529 north / Cottonwood Church Road / Kroesche Road US 59 south	Current southern terminus of I-69; US 59 continues south; southbound exit signed for Spur 10
Fort Bend	Rosenberg	95.0	152.9	95	Spur 529 / Kroesche Rd	Southbound exit and northbound entrance
Fort Bend	Rosenberg	96.3	155.0	96	Bamore Road	Southbound exit and northbound entrance
Fort Bend	Rosenberg	96.9	155.9	97	SH 36 – Rosenberg	
Fort Bend	Rosenberg	98.9	159.2	99	FM 2218 (BF Terry Boulevard) – Richmond	
Fort Bend	Rosenberg	100.2	161.3	100	Reading Road	
Fort Bend		100.8	162.2	101	FM 762 – Richmond, Rosenberg	
Fort Bend		102.7	165.3	103	Richmond Parkway / Williams Way Boulevard	To Oak Bend Medical Center
Fort Bend	Sugar Land	104.4	168.0	104	SH 99 north (Grand Parkway) / FM 2759 south (Crabb River Road)	To Memorial Hermann Sugar Land Hospital; signed as exit 105 southbound
Fort Bend	Sugar Land	105.8	170.3	105	Brazos River Turnaround	Signed as exit 106 southbound; southbound turnaround closed permanently since 2016 due to flooding from May 2016 North American storm complex
Fort Bend	Sugar Land	107.3	172.7	107	University Boulevard	
Fort Bend	Sugar Land	108.3	174.3	108	First Colony Boulevard, Sweetwater Boulevard	To Methodist Sugar Land Hospital
Fort Bend	Sugar Land	109.3	175.9	109	SH 6 – Sugarland Airport	Former FM 1960
Fort Bend	Sugar Land	110.1	177.2	110	Sugar Lakes Drive, Williams Trace Boulevard	To St. Luke's Sugar Land Hospital
Fort Bend	Sugar Land	111.3	179.1	111	Dairy Ashford Road, Sugar Creek Boulevard	Dairy Ashford Road was formerly Spur 41
Fort Bend	Sugar Land	112.0	180.2	112	US 90 Alt. – Sugar Land, Stafford	
Fort Bend–Harris county line	Stafford	113.0	181.9	113	Kirkwood Road, West Airport Boulevard	Signed as exit 114 southbound
Harris	Houston	114.4	184.1	114	Wilcrest Drive, Murphy Road (FM 1092 south) / West Bellfort Avenue	Signed as exit 115A southbound
Harris	Houston	115.1	185.2	115	Sam Houston Tollway	Signed as exit 115B southbound
Harris	Houston	115.5	185.9	115C	Beltway 8 (Frontage Road)	No direct northbound exit (signed at exit 114)
Harris	Houston	116.5	187.5	117	Bissonnet Street	
Harris	Houston	117.6– 117.9	189.3– 189.7	118	South Gessner Road, Beechnut Street	To Memorial Hermann Southwest Hospital
Harris	Houston	118.7– 119.1	191.0– 191.7	119	Fondren Road, Bellaire Boulevard	
Harris	Houston	120.3	193.6	121A	Hillcroft Avenue, Westpark Drive	
Harris	Houston	121.1	194.9	121B	Westpark Tollway east	Northbound access to eastbound tollway, southbound access to westbound tollway only
Harris	Houston	121.3	195.2	121C	Westpark Drive	No direct northbound exit (signed at exit 121A); no access to or from HOV lane (access is via Edloe Street)
Harris	Houston	121.5	195.5	122B	Fountainview Drive	Southbound exit and northbound entrance
Harris	Houston	121.9	196.2	122A	Chimney Rock Road, Sage Road, South Rice Avenue	Signed as exit 122 northbound
Harris	Houston	122.9	197.8	123	I-610 (West Loop Freeway) – IAH Airport, Hobby Airport	I-610 exits 8A-B; redesigned stack interchange
Harris	Houston	123.5	198.8	124	Newcastle Drive	No direct northbound exit (signed at exit 125A)
Harris	Houston	124.1	199.7	125A	Weslayan Road	
Harris	Houston	124.6	200.5	125B	Edloe Street – Buffalo Speedway	Northbound and southbound are signed differently
Harris	Houston	125.5	202.0	126A	Kirby Drive	
Harris	Houston	125.8– 126.0	202.5– 202.8	126B	Greenbriar Drive, Shepherd Drive	
Harris	Houston	127.3	204.9	127B	Richmond Avenue – Downtown Houston	Via Louisiana Street (Spur 527); northbound left exit and southbound entrance
Harris	Houston	127.5	205.2	127A	Main Street	Northbound exit and southbound entrance; to Texas Medical Center
Harris	Houston	127.6	205.4	128A	Fannin Street	Southbound exit and northbound entrance; to Texas Medical Center
Harris	Houston	128.3	206.5	128B	SH 288 south (South Freeway) to SH 288 Toll (Brazoria County Expressway) – Lake Jackson, Freeport	
Harris	Houston	128.9	207.4	129A	McGowen Avenue, Tuam Avenue	To St. Joseph Medical Center
Harris	Houston	129.2	207.9	129B	Gray Avenue, Pierce Avenue – Downtown Destinations	Northbound exit and southbound entrance; to St. Joseph Medical Center
Harris	Houston	129.3	208.1	129A	I-45 (Gulf Freeway) – Dallas, Galveston	I-45 exit 46; to Bush Intercontinental Airport and William P. Hobby Airport; signed as exit 129B southbound
Harris	Houston	129.7	208.7	130	Polk Street – Downtown Destinations	Northbound exit only
Harris	Houston				Texas Avenue; Capitol Avenue	Closed; was southbound exit and northbound entrance
Harris	Houston				Runnels Street, Canal Street	Closed; was southbound exit and northbound entrance
Harris	Houston	130.9	210.7	131	Jackson Street – Downtown Destinations	Southbound exit and northbound entrance
Harris	Houston	131.4	211.5	132	I-10 (Baytown East Freeway & US 90) – San Antonio, Beaumont	I-10 exit 770
Harris	Houston	131.8– 132.5	212.1– 213.2	132B	Lyons Avenue, Quitman Street, Liberty Road	Signed as exit 133A southbound
Harris	Houston	133.2	214.4	133B	Collingsworth Street, Kelley Street	Signed as exit 133A northbound
Harris	Houston	133.7	215.2	134	Cavalcade Street	No direct northbound exit (signed at exit 133B)
Harris	Houston	134.2	216.0	134-135B	I-610 (North Loop Freeway) to Hardy Toll Road	Signed as exits 135A (west) & 135B (east) southbound, exit 134 northbound; I-610 exit 20; access to Hardy Toll Road via I-610 west
Harris	Houston	134.6– 135.7	216.6– 218.4	136	Crosstimbers Road, Kelley Street	Kelley Street was formerly Loop 137
Harris	Houston	136.5	219.7	137A	Laura Koppe Road	No direct southbound exit (signed at exit 137B)
Harris	Houston	137.0	220.5	137B	Tidwell Road, Laura Koppe Road	Signed as exit 137 southbound
Harris	Houston	137.8	221.8	138	Parker Road, Jensen Drive, Saunders Road	
Harris		138.6	223.1	139	Little York Road, Hopper Road	
Harris		139.3	224.2	140A	Hopper Road	No direct northbound exit (signed at exit 139)
Harris		140.2	225.6	140B	East Mount Houston Road	Signed as exit 140 northbound
Harris		141.1	227.1	141	Aldine Mail Route, Lauder Road	
Harris		141.6	227.9	142	Lauder Road	No direct northbound exit (signed at exit 141)
Harris		142.7	229.7	143A	Old Humble Road, Lee Road (FM 525 Spur), Homestead Road	Northbound exit and southbound entrance
Harris	Houston	143.1	230.3	143B	FM 525 (Aldine Bender Road)	Signed as exit 143 southbound
Harris	Houston	143.8	231.4	144A	Beltway 8 (Sam Houston Parkway) to Sam Houston Tollway	Signed as exit 144 northbound; access to Sam Houston Tollway (not signed) via Beltway 8 east
Harris	Houston	144.0	231.7	144B	Beltway 8 (Frontage Road)	No direct northbound exit (signed exit 143B)
Harris	Houston	144.7	232.9	145	Greens Road	
Harris	Humble	145.7	234.5	146	Rankin Road	
Harris	Humble	147.0	236.6	147	Will Clayton Parkway – Bush Intercontinental Airport	Formerly Jetero Boulevard
Harris	Humble	148.3– 148.6	238.7– 239.1	149	FM 1960 / FM Bus. 1960 – Humble	To Memorial Hermann Northeast Hospital; Business FM 1960 was formerly Loop 184
Harris	Humble	149.6	240.8	150	Townsen Boulevard	No direct southbound exit (signed at exit 151)
Montgomery	Houston	150.6	242.4	151	Loop 494 north / Hamblen Road / Sorters-McClellan Road	
Montgomery	Houston	152.1	244.8	152	Kingwood Drive	
Montgomery	Houston	153.3	246.7	153	Northpark Drive	
Montgomery		155.8	250.7	156	FM 1314 – Porter, Conroe	
Montgomery		156.9	252.5	157A	To SH 99 Toll east (Grand Parkway) – Baytown; Community Drive	Southbound exit is via exit 157; access to eastbound Grand Parkway (opened in May 2022) via frontage road
Montgomery		157.5	253.5	157B	SH 99 Toll west (Grand Parkway) – Spring	Northbound exit & entrance flyover ramps
Montgomery		157.6	253.6	157	To SH 99 Toll (Grand Parkway) – Spring, Baytown	Southbound exit & entrance; southbound access to Grand Parkway via frontage road; SH 99 east of I-69/US 59 (Eastex Freeway) opened in May 2022
Montgomery		158.0	254.3	159A	FM 1485 – New Caney	Northbound exit and southbound entrance
Montgomery		159.5	256.7	159B	Loop 494 south / Roman Forest Boulevard	Northbound exit and southbound entrance
Montgomery		159.6	256.9	159	FM 1485 / Loop 494 – New Caney	Southbound exit and northbound entrance; Loop 494 access requires U-turn to go under freeway
Montgomery	Woodbranch	160.9	258.9	160	Roman Forest Boulevard	Southbound exit and northbound entrance
Montgomery	Woodbranch–Patton Village line	162.5	261.5	161	SH 242 west	
Montgomery	Patton Village	163.7	263.4	163	Creekwood Lane	
Montgomery	Splendora	165.6	266.5	165	FM 2090 – Splendora	
Montgomery	Splendora	167.1	268.9	166	East River Drive	
Montgomery		168.6	271.3	167	Fostoria Road	Northbound exit, southbound entrance
Liberty		169.3	272.5	169	Mandell Road, Fostoria Road	Exit opened in March 2023; southbound exit, northbound entrance
Liberty		170.3	274.1	170	CR 381, CR 383	Exit opened in March 2023
Liberty	Cleveland	172.0	276.8	172	SH 105 / Gladstell Road – Cleveland, Conroe	Exit opened April 2023
Liberty	Cleveland	173.2	278.7	173	Loop 573 (Washington Avenue)	
Liberty	Cleveland	174.0	280.0	174	Bus. SH 105 – Cleveland, Conroe	
Liberty	Cleveland	175.3	282.1	175	FM 2025 – Coldspring	
Liberty	Cleveland	176.7	284.4	176	Loop 573 (Washington Avenue)	
Liberty	Cleveland	176.7	284.4	–	US 59 north	Current northern terminus of I-69; US 59 continues north
San Jacinto		179.0	288.1	179	Frontage Road, Sherwood Drive	Future southbound interchange; northbound Sherwood Drive access via Red Road exit
San Jacinto		180.0	289.7	180	Red Road	Future northbound interchange; northbound Sherwood Drive would take this exit and take U-turn at Red Road
San Jacinto		182.7	294.0	182	FM 2914 east to FM 3460	
San Jacinto	Shepherd	183.0	294.5	183	Loop 424 / FM 3460 – Shepherd	interchange; signed as N/A northbound
San Jacinto	Shepherd	185.0	297.7	185	Frontage Road	Southbound exit only
San Jacinto	Shepherd	186.0	299.3	186	SH 150 / FM 223 – Rye, Shepherd, Coldspring	interchange; signed as exit N/A B northbound; 186 southbound
San Jacinto	Shepherd	187.0	300.9	187	Loop 424	no left turn northbound; future interchange; southbound exit only
San Jacinto		189.0	304.2	189	FM 1127 east	Future interchange; to be signed as exit 189 southbound
San Jacinto		190.0	305.8	190	To US 59 south	Future northbound exit and southbound entrance
San Jacinto		191.0	307.4	191	Frontage Road	Future southbound exit and northbound entrance
Trinity River				I-69/US 59 Trinity River Bridge		
Polk		192.0	309.0	192	To US 59 north	Future southbound exit and northbound entrance
Polk	Goodrich	194.0	312.2	194	Loop 393 north – Goodrich	Future interchange
Polk	Goodrich	195.0	313.8	195	FM 1988 (Border Street) to FM 2665 south	Upgrade to interstate standards
Polk	Goodrich	196.0	315.4	196	Loop 393 south – Goodrich	Future interchange
Polk	Livingston	200.0	321.9	200	A: Bus. US 59 north – Livingston B: Lake Livingston State Park C: Frontage Road	
Gap in route
Shelby	Tenaha	309.0	497.3	309	I-369 north / US 59 north / US 84 east / US 96 south – Texarkana, Beaumont	I-69 will continue north along US 84 east into Louisiana towards Shreveport; future southern terminus of I-369; future north end of US 59 concurrency; northern terminus of US 96; interchange is currently open for US 59/US 84/US 96 traffic
1.000 mi = 1.609 km; 1.000 km = 0.621 mi: Closed/former; Concurrency terminus; Incomplete access; Tolled; Unopened

== Notes ==
Interstate 69
Previous state: Terminus	Texas	Next state: Louisiana
