= U.S. Route 90 Alternate =

Auxiliary U.S. numbered highway in Texas, United States

Alternate U.S. Highway 90
- US 90 Alternate, highlighted in red

Route information
- Maintained by TxDOT
- Length: 175.29 mi (282.10 km)
- Existed: 1942–present

Major junctions
- West end: US 90 / FM 464 west of Seguin
- US 183 in Gonzales; US 77 in Hallettsville; I-69 / US 59 near Sugar Land; I-610 in Houston; I-45 in Houston
- East end: I-10 / US 90 in Houston

Location
- Country: United States
- State: Texas
- Counties: Guadalupe, Gonzales, Lavaca, Colorado, Wharton, Fort Bend, Harris

Highway system
- United States Numbered Highway System; List; Special; Divided; Highways in Texas; Interstate; US; State; Former; Toll; Loops; Spurs; FM/RM; Park; Rec
← SH 342	SH 343	→ SH 344

U.S. Highway 90 Alternate is an alternate route to U.S. Highway 90 in Texas, United States, running from west of Seguin east via Seguin, Gonzales, Hallettsville, Eagle Lake, Rosenberg and Sugar Land to northeastern Houston. South of Downtown Houston, US 90 Alternate is built to freeway and near-freeway standards along a section of South Main Street.

== Route description ==
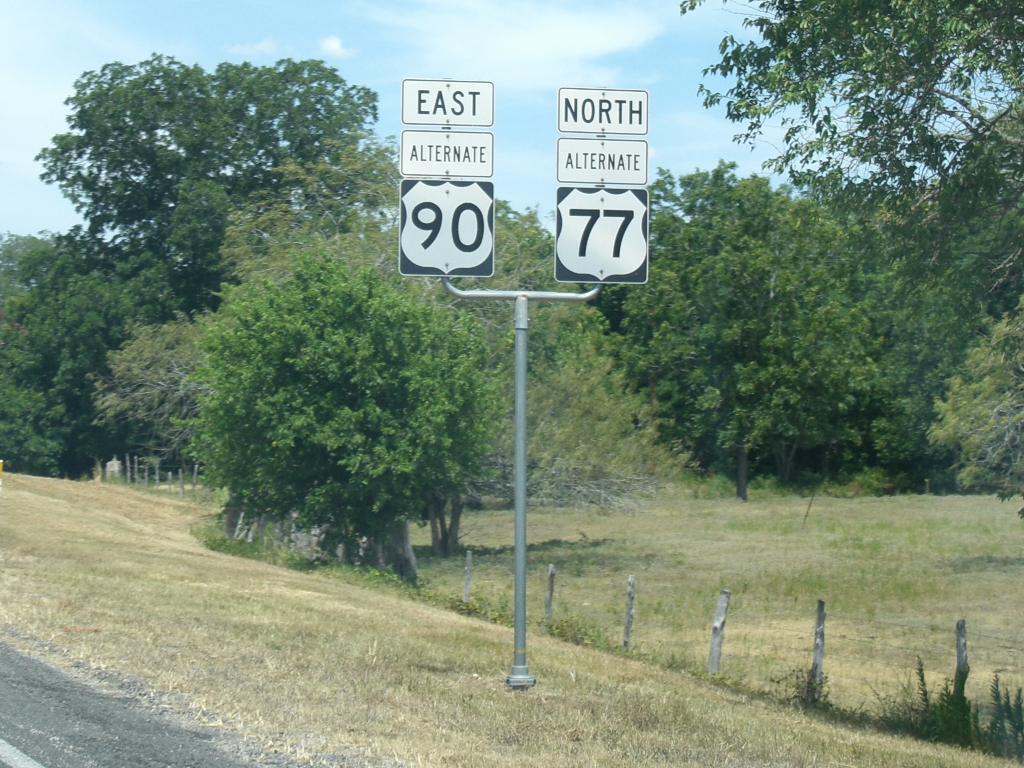
U.S. 90 Alternate is concurrent with U.S. 77 Alternate west of Hallettsville.

US 90 Alternate begins at U.S. Highway 90 and Farm to Market Road 464 west of Seguin and heads east through downtown Seguin on Court Street. (US 90 travels on Kingsbury Street, just 15 blocks to the north.) From Seguin to Rosenberg, US 90 Alternate passes through mainly rural areas.

Just west of downtown Rosenberg, it merges with Spur 529, part of US Highway 59 until 1976. US 59 used to run concurrent with US 90 Alternate between Rosenberg and southwest of downtown Houston, but it was relocated to the US 59 as construction of the freeway between Houston and Rosenberg was completed in stages from 1961 to 1976. In 2017, US 90 Alternate and FM 1640 were converted to a one-way pair in Rosenberg, with US 90 Alternate carrying westbound traffic and FM 1640 carrying eastbound traffic.

After Rosenberg, US 90 Alternate passes through Richmond, Sugar Land, Stafford and Missouri City before entering Houston. US 90A in Sugar Land between State Highway 6 and the Southwest Freeway is an 8 lane boulevard with at-grade signalized intersections. A section in Stafford from the Southwest Freeway to Promenade Boulevard (east of Dulles Avenue) is a short controlled access highway similar in design to the one which stretches from Present Street to the South Loop. There it crosses the Sam Houston Tollway into the Houston city limits and becomes South Main Street. A few miles down, the highway meets the current northern terminus of the Fort Bend Toll Road. The short controlled-access highway portion of US 90 Alternate—part of which has local access (right-in/right-out), but no median breaks – currently begins east of Present Street in Stafford just before the Sam Houston Tollway and ends just short of Interstate 610. The controlled access portion, with the section between I-610 to just west of Holmes Road was completed in 2002 and the section from just west of Holmes Road to just east of the Sam Houston Tollway completed in 2007 has 6 lanes without interior or exterior shoulder lanes, plus exit lanes and a maximum speed limit of 55 mph (89 km/h) for most of its length. These portions were previously a four-lane divided highway with exterior shoulder lanes, crossovers, and at grade crossings with major thoroughfares.

North of I-610, US 90A becomes the widest street in Houston with 10 through lanes and several turning lanes. This section, previously a four-lane divided highway, was upgraded to its current width between 1999 and 2001. The 10 lane right of way of US 90A between the Old Spanish Trail (OST) and the South Loop was planned to ease access to the NRG Park (formerly Reliant Park and the Astrodomain) complex parking lots west of NRG Stadium. Further north, US 90A splits from South Main Street onto the OST, becoming a six lane boulevard heading east to cross State Highway 288 (South Freeway) with a grade separated street-to-street intersection with Griggs Road, and meets the southern terminus of Spur 5 adjacent to the campus of the University of Houston. After crossing Spur 5, it turns into a four-lane undivided road, crossing Brays Bayou and turning northeast onto Wayside Drive, crossing Interstate 45 (Gulf Freeway). Between Polk Street until after crossing over the ship channel, it divides into two one-way streets. US 90 Alternate West (southbound) is Wayside Drive while US 90 Alternate East (northbound) goes down S/SGT Macario Garcia Drive (formerly 69th Street). At Interstate 10/U.S. Highway 90 (East Freeway), US 90 Alternate turns east to multiplex with I-10/US 90 for a short jog, then turning north onto McCarty Street. US 90 Alternate ends at the junction with Interstate 610 in northeastern Houston, where Business U.S. Highway 90-U continues northeast on McCarty Street.

== History ==
US 90 Alternate was designated on May 25, 1942, replacing SH 343. On March 28, 1952, the section from Columbus to Eagle Lake became part of FM 102. US 90A was instead rerouted over portions of SH 200 and SH 3.

== Major intersections ==
County	Location	mi	km	Destinations	Notes
Guadalupe	Seguin			US 90 / FM 464 west – San Antonio, Luling	
Guadalupe	Seguin			SH 46 to I-10 – New Braunfels	
Guadalupe	Seguin			Bus. SH 123 (Austin Street)	
Guadalupe	Seguin			FM 466 (King Street)	
Guadalupe	Seguin			SH 123 – San Marcos, Stockdale	
Guadalupe	Old Seguin			FM 1117 south	
Guadalupe	Old Seguin			FM 2438 north to I-10 – Kingsbury	
Guadalupe	Old Seguin			FM 1150 east – Darst Field	
Gonzales	Belmont			SH 80 – Luling, Nixon	
Gonzales				FM 2091 north – Palmetto State Park	west end of FM 2091 overlap
Gonzales				FM 2091 south – Lake Wood Recreational Area	east end of FM 2091 overlap
Gonzales	Gonzales			US 183 / SH 97 west – Luling, Cuero	west end of SH 97 overlap
Gonzales	Gonzales			Bus. US 183 (St. Joseph Street)	
Gonzales	Gonzales			FM 794 north (St. Paul Street)	
Gonzales	Gonzales			Spur 131	
Gonzales	Gonzales			SH 97 east – Waelder	east end of SH 97 overlap
Gonzales	Gonzales			Spur 146 west	
Gonzales	Gonzales			FM 532 east – Moulton	
Gonzales				FM 443 south – Dreyer	
Lavaca				FM 533 west	
Lavaca	Shiner			FM 3435 east (Sixteenth Street)	
Lavaca	Shiner			SH 95 – Moulton, Yoakum	
Lavaca				FM 531 east	
Lavaca				FM 1891 west	
Lavaca				US 77 Alt. south – Yoakum	west end of US 77 Alt. overlap
Lavaca				FM 340 west – St. Mary's	
Lavaca	Hallettsville			US 77 south – Victoria	west end of US 77 overlap
Lavaca	Hallettsville			US 77 north – Schulenburg	east end of US 77 overlap
Lavaca	Hallettsville			FM 530 south – Vienna, Edna	
Lavaca	Hallettsville			FM 2314 east – Vsetin	
Lavaca	Sublime			FM 3283 south	
Lavaca				FM 155 north – Weimar	
Colorado	Sheridan			FM 2437 south	
Colorado	Altair			SH 71 – Columbus, El Campo	
Colorado	Eagle Lake			FM Spur 102 north (McCarty Avenue)	
Colorado	Eagle Lake			FM 102 north (Main Street) – Columbus	west end of FM 102 overlap
Colorado	Eagle Lake			FM 102 south	east end of FM 102 overlap
Colorado	Eagle Lake			FM 3013 to FM 1093 east – Sealy, Wallis, Wharton, Attwater Prairie Chicken National Wildlife Refuge	
Colorado–Wharton county line				FM 2764 north – Chesterville	
Wharton	Nottawa			FM 1164 east	
Wharton	East Bernard			SH 60 – Wallis, Wharton	
Fort Bend	Tavener			FM 1952 north – Wallis	
Fort Bend				FM 1875 south – Beasley	
Fort Bend	Rosenberg			Spur 10	
Fort Bend	Rosenberg			SH 36 north – Sealy	west end of SH 36 overlap
Fort Bend	Rosenberg			Spur 529 south – Wharton	
Fort Bend	Rosenberg			SH 36 south / FM 723 north – Fulshear, Freeport	east end of SH 36 overlap
Fort Bend	Richmond			FM 762 south (South Eleventh Street) – Crabb	
Fort Bend	Richmond			FM Loop 762 south (South Second Street)	
Fort Bend				FM 359 north	
Fort Bend				SH 99 (Grand Parkway) to FM 1464 – Clodine, Carol S. Vance Unit	
Fort Bend	Sugar Land			SH 6 – Missouri City, Galveston, Airport	interchange; former FM 1960
Fort Bend	Sugar Land			Brooks Street	Former Spur 58
Fort Bend	Sugar Land			FM 1876 north (Eldridge Road)	
Fort Bend	Sugar Land			Dairy Ashford Road	Former Spur 41
Fort Bend	Sugar Land			I-69 / US 59 – Houston, Victoria	I-69/US 59 exit 112; interchange.
Fort Bend	Stafford			South Kirkwood Road / Dulles Avenue	interchange
Fort Bend	Stafford			FM 1092 (Murphy Road)	interchange
Fort Bend	Stafford			Stafford Road / Staffordshire Road	interchange
Fort Bend	Missouri City			FM 2234 (Texas Parkway) / South Gessner Road	limited-access highway starts before interchange. (Grade Separated)
Harris	Houston			Beltway 8 (Frontage Road) / Sam Houston Tollway	interchange
Harris	Houston			Fondren Road	interchange
Harris	Houston			Hillcroft Road	interchange
Harris	Houston			Fort Bend Tollway south to Sam Houston Tollway / Chimney Rock Road	interchange
Harris	Houston			South Post Oak Road	interchange
Harris	Houston			Hiram Clarke Road / Holmes Road	interchange
Harris	Houston			Stella Link Road / Willowbend Boulevard	interchange
Harris	Houston			West Bellfort Avenue	limited-access highway ends after interchange
Harris	Houston			I-610	I-610 exit 2
Harris	Houston			FM 521 south (Almeda Road)	Former SH 288
Harris	Houston			SH 288 (South Freeway)	interchange
Harris	Houston			Griggs Road	interchange
Harris	Houston			FM 865 south (Cullen Boulevard)	Former FM 518
Harris	Houston			Spur 5 north to I-45	
Harris	Houston			Produce Row	interchange
Harris	Houston			I-45 (Gulf Freeway) – Conroe, Galveston	I-45 exit 42
Harris	Houston			Lawndale Street	interchange
Harris	Houston			Zoltowski Street / Clinton Drive / Harbor Street	interchange
Harris	Houston			I-10 west / US 90 west (East Freeway)	west end of I-10 overlap; US 90 Alt. west follows exit 773A
Harris	Houston			I-10 east / US 90 east (East Freeway)	east end of I-10 overlap; US 90 Alt. east follows exit 773B
Harris	Houston			I-610 (North Loop Freeway, East Loop Freeway) / Bus. US 90 east (North McCarty Street)	Eastern terminus; I-610 exit 24A northbound, 24 eastbound
1.000 mi = 1.609 km; 1.000 km = 0.621 mi: Concurrency terminus

== See also ==
- List of U.S. Highways in Texas
- Special routes of U.S. Route 90
