= Texas State Highway Spur 527 =

State highway in Texas

State Highway Spur 527
- Spur 527 highlighted in red

Route information
- Maintained by TxDOT
- Length: 0.863 mi (1,389 m)
- Existed: 1976–present

Major junctions
- South end: I-69 / US 59
- North end: Elgin Street at Bagby Street and Brazos Street

Location
- Country: United States
- State: Texas

Highway system
- Highways in Texas; Interstate; US; State; Former; Toll; Loops; Spurs; FM/RM; Park; Rec
← Spur 515	→ Spur 529

Spur 527 is a 0.863-mile (1.389 km) spur route in Midtown Houston in the U.S. state of Texas. The roadway is a freeway spur that feeds traffic from the Southwest Freeway (Interstate 69/U.S. Highway 59) into Downtown Houston. The route is mostly unsigned, except for a sign posted on the southbound side, right after an intersection with Smith Street.

== History ==
On July 30, 1976, Spur 527 was designated as a spur of US 59 in Houston. The freeway was the original routing of US 59 into downtown before being rerouted further east. The freeway was built in the early 1960s as the overpasses at Richmond Avenue and Alabama Street had been completed by 1961.

On July 1, 2019, the Brazos Street exit was closed, forcing all traffic to exit at Louisiana Street. Houston Public Works said the “bridge deck has deteriorated significantly and is being closed immediately to protect the community from falling debris.” On February 26, 2020, Houston Public Works released a concept design for a park where the Brazos Street Bridge now stands. Repairs to the bridge have stalled amid debate between stakeholders. On January 27, 2021, the exit ramp reopened two weeks ahead of schedule following repairs.

== Route description ==
Spur 527 branches off I-69/US 59 on the west side of Midtown and heads northeast, feeding traffic into downtown. It provides access to Richmond Avenue and Travis Street before curving towards the north as it passes over Alabama Street. As it continues north through Midtown, the spur provides access to Louisiana Street before coming to an end at Elgin Street. The northbound lanes continue onto Brazos Street past Elgin Street and Bagby Street becomes the southbound lanes of Spur 527 after crossing Elgin Street.

== Exit list ==
The entire route is in Houston, Harris County. All exits are unnumbered.

mi	km	Destinations	Notes
		I-69 south / US 59 south – Victoria	I-69/US 59 exit 127B northbound; southbound exit and northbound entrance.
		Richmond Avenue	Northbound exit and southbound entrance
		Travis Street	Northbound exit and southbound entrance
		Louisiana Street – Downtown	Northbound exit and southbound entrance
		Brazos Street	Northbound exit and southbound entrance
1.000 mi = 1.609 km; 1.000 km = 0.621 mi: Incomplete access
