= Texas State Highway Spur 529 =

State highway in Texas

State Highway Spur 529

Route information
- Maintained by TxDOT
- Length: 2.86 mi (4.60 km)
- Existed: 1976–present

Major junctions
- South end: I-69 / US 59
- FM 1640
- North end: US 90 Alt. / SH 36

Location
- Country: United States
- State: Texas

Highway system
- Highways in Texas; Interstate; US; State; Former; Toll; Loops; Spurs; FM/RM; Park; Rec
← Spur 527	→ Spur 535

Texas State Highway Spur 529 is a spur route in the U.S. state of Texas entirely within Fort Bend County. The highway begins at Interstate 69 (I-69)/U.S. Route 59 (US 59) southwest of Rosenberg, continues 2.86 miles (4.60 km) to the northeast and ends at an intersection with U.S. Route 90 Alternate (US 90 Alt.) and Texas State Highway 36 (SH 36) inside the western part of Rosenberg.

== History ==
On August 23, 1976, Spur 529 was designated to run from US 90 Alt. in Rosenberg southwest to US 59. The 1955 United States Geological Survey (USGS) map of Richmond showed that US 59 and US 90 Alt. shared the same right-of-way as far as the western edge of Rosenberg. At that point, US 59 forked to the southwest toward Beasley, alongside the Texas and New Orleans Railroad. The 1971 USGS map showed the new US 59 (now dual signed as I-69/US 59) freeway passing to the south of Rosenberg. Spur 529 was labeled in purple which meant that the change occurred between 1971 and the 1980 map revision.

== Route description ==
Spur 529 begins at a stop sign on I-69/US 59 southwest of Rosenberg. At that point I-69/US 59 is a four lane divided highway called the Southwest Freeway. Because Spur 529 intersects I-69/US 59 at a right angle, it first goes about 50 yards (46 m) to the north. The two-lane Spur 529 then turns to the northeast next to the Union Pacific Railroad tracks, and continues in a straight line until near its northern terminus. Spur 529 passes a few large manufacturing establishments before the Seabourne Meadows subdivision appears on the right. After about 2.6 miles (4.2 km) the highway intersects FM 1640, also called Avenue I. In the last 0.2 miles (0.3 km), Spur 529 curves to the east into Avenue H and ends at a stop sign at US 90 Alt. and SH 36.

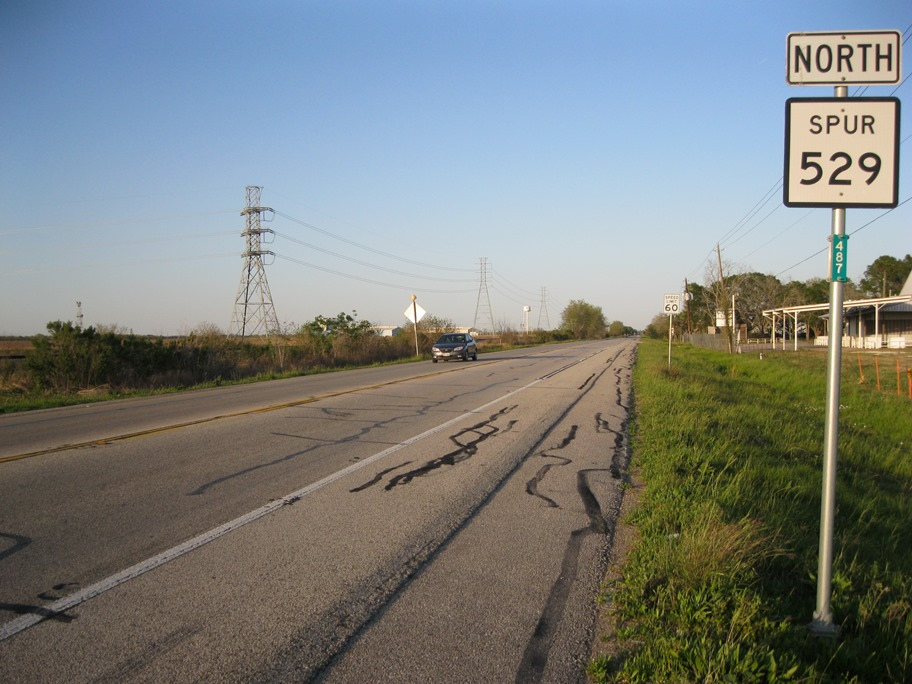
View is northeast from the I-69/US 59 intersection

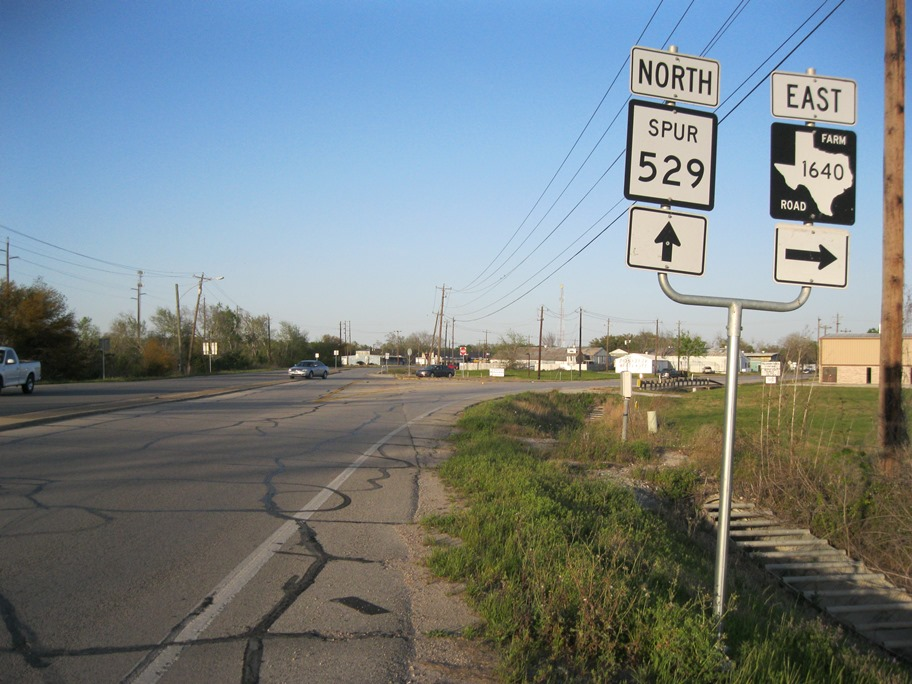
Looking northeast at FM 1640 in Rosenberg

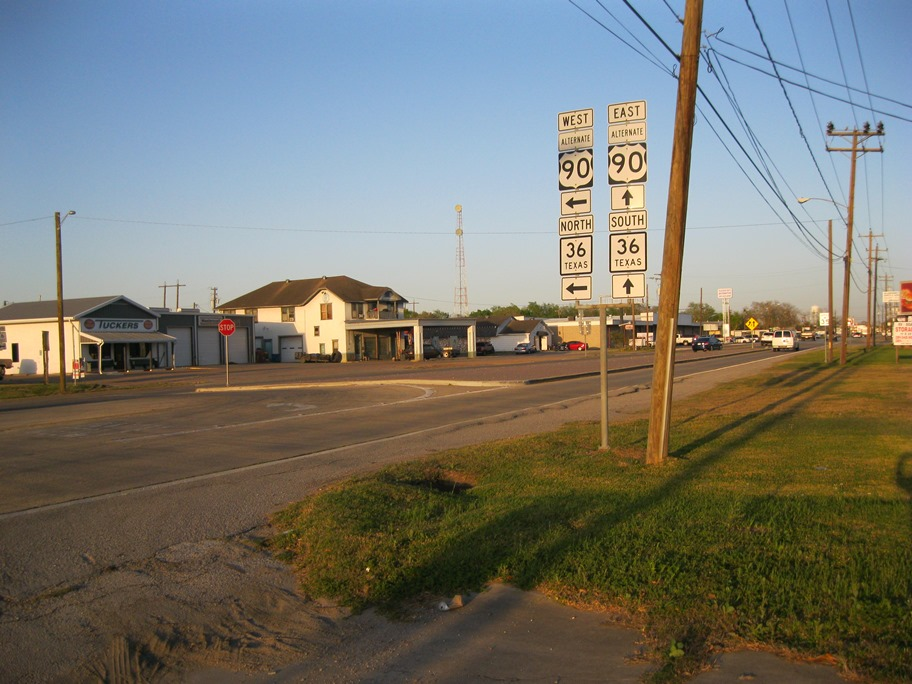
View is east at US 90 Alt. and SH 36 in Rosenberg

== Major intersections ==
The entire highway is in Rosenberg, Fort Bend County.

mi	km	Destinations	Notes
0.0	0.0	I-69 north / US 59 – Wharton, Houston	Southern terminus of Spur 529; temporary southern terminus of I-69; I-69/US 59 exit 94
2.66	4.28	FM 1640 (Avenue I) – Richmond	
2.86	4.60	US 90 Alt. / SH 36 – East Bernard, Wallis	Interchange; Northern terminus of Spur 529
1.000 mi = 1.609 km; 1.000 km = 0.621 mi
