= List of state highway loops in Texas (500–9999) =

- Texas State Highway Loop marker

Highway names
- Interstates: Interstate Highway X (IH-X, I-X)
- US Highways: U.S. Highway X (US X)
- State: State Highway X (SH X)
- Loops: Loop X
- Spurs: Spur X
- Farm or Ranch to Market Roads: Farm to Market Road X (FM X); Ranch-to-Market Road X (RM X)
- Park Roads: Park Road X (PR X)

System links
- Highways in Texas; Interstate; US; State; Former; Toll; Loops; Spurs; FM/RM; Park; Rec

State highway loops in Texas are owned and maintained by the Texas Department of Transportation (TxDOT).

== Loop 500 ==
State Highway Loop 500
- Location: Shelby County
- Length: 1.021 mi (1.643 km)
- Existed: April 29, 1971–present

Loop 500 is located in Shelby County. It runs from US 96 northwest of Center to SH 7 southwest of Center.

Loop 500 was designated on April 29, 1971, as a loop off SH 7 in Center. On August 26, 2010, the northern section was extended west 2.9 miles (4.7 km) to US 96 northwest of Center.

== Loop 505 ==
State Highway Loop 505
- Location: Newton County
- Length: 3.654 mi (5.881 km)
- Existed: August 31, 1972–present

Loop 505 is located in Newton County. It runs from SH 87 northeast of Newton to SH 87 southwest of Newton.

Loop 505 was designated on August 31, 1972, on the current route along an old routing of SH 87; the route was signed as SH 87 Business rather than Loop 505.

== Loop 506 ==
State Highway Loop 506
- Location: Wise County
- Existed: May 31, 1972–June 21, 1990

Loop 506 was located in Wise County. It is now Bus. US 81.

== Loop 507 ==
State Highway Loop 507
- Location: Brazos County
- Existed: August 31, 1972–June 21, 1990

Loop 507 was designated on August 31, 1972, as a loop off SH 6 in Bryan-College Station. The route was signed as SH 6 Business rather than Loop 507. On June 21, 1990, Loop 507 was cancelled and transferred to Bus. SH 6.

== Loop 508 ==
State Highway Loop 508
- Location: Grimes County
- Existed: August 31, 1972–June 21, 1990

Loop 508 was designated on August 31, 1972, as a loop off SH 6 in Navasota. The route was signed as SH 6 Business rather than Loop 508. On June 21, 1990, Loop 508 was cancelled and transferred to Bus. SH 6.

== Loop 509 ==
State Highway Loop 509
- Location: Collin County
- Existed: July 31, 1972–June 21, 1990

Loop 509 was designated on July 31, 1972, as a loop off SH 78 in Copeville along an old routing of SH 78. on June 21, 1990, Loop 509 was cancelled and transferred to Bus. SH 78.

== Loop 512 ==
State Highway Loop 512
- Location: Montgomery County
- Existed: November 3, 1972–June 21, 1990

Loop 512 was designated on November 3, 1972, as a loop off US 59 in Splendora along an old routing of US 59. The route was signed as US 59 Business rather than Loop 512. On June 21, 1990, Loop 512 was cancelled and transferred to Bus. US 59.

== Loop 513 ==
State Highway Loop 513
- Location: Guadalupe County
- Existed: September 4, 1973–June 21, 1990

Loop 513 was designated on September 4, 1973, as a loop off SH 123 in Seguin along an old routing of SH 123. The route was signed as SH 123 Business rather than Loop 513. On June 21, 1990, Loop 513 was cancelled and transferred to Bus. SH 123.

== Loop 516 ==
State Highway Loop 516
- Location: Bee County
- Existed: May 31, 1973–June 21, 1990

Loop 516 was designated on May 31, 1973, as a loop off US 181 in Beeville along an old routing of US 181. The route was signed as US 181 Business rather than Loop 516. On June 21, 1990, Loop 516 was cancelled and transferred to Bus. US 181.

== Loop 517 ==
State Highway Loop 517
- Location: Dimmit County
- Length: 2.694 mi (4.336 km)
- Existed: June 20, 1975–present

Loop 517 is located in Dimmit County. It runs from US 83 northeast of Carrizo Springs to US 277 northwest of Carrizo Springs.

Loop 517 was designated on June 20, 1975, on the current route.

== Loop 518 ==
State Highway Loop 518
- Location: Bell County
- Existed: November 25, 1975–June 21, 1990

Loop 518 was designated on November 25, 1975, as a loop off US 190 in Killeen along an old routing of US 190. The route was signed as US 190 Business instead of Loop 518. On June 21, 1990, Loop 518 was cancelled and transferred to Bus. US 190.

== Loop 519 ==
State Highway Loop 519
- Location: Culberson County
- Existed: November 25, 1975–June 21, 1990

Loop 519 was located in Culberson County. It was the former alignment of US 80 through Van Horn. It is now Business I-10.

== Loop 520 ==
State Highway Loop 520
- Location: Hill County
- Existed: November 25, 1975–June 21, 1990

Loop 520 was designated on November 25, 1975, as a loop off SH 171 in Covington along an old routing of SH 171. On June 21, 1990, Loop 520 was cancelled and transferred to Bus. SH 171.

== Loop 521 ==
State Highway Loop 521
- Location: Jackson County
- Length: 3.442 mi (5.539 km)
- Existed: June 30, 1976–present

Loop 521 is located in Jackson County. It runs from US 59 east of Edna to US 59 west of Edna.

Loop 521 was designated on June 30, 1976, on the current route along an old routing of US 59.

Major intersections

The entire route is in Edna, Jackson County.

mi	km	Destinations	Notes
0.0	0.0	Future I-69 / US 59 – Victoria, Houston	Interchange; southern terminus
1.0	1.6	FM 1822 south	
1.7	2.7	FM 822 north (Allen Street)	
1.9	3.1	SH 111	
3.4	5.5	Future I-69 / US 59 – Houston	Interchange; northern terminus
1.000 mi = 1.609 km; 1.000 km = 0.621 mi

== Loop 522 ==
State Highway Loop 522
- Location: Jackson County
- Length: 2.571 mi (4.138 km)
- Existed: June 30, 1976–present

Loop 522 is located in Jackson County. It runs from US 59 east of Ganado to US 59 west of Ganado.

Loop 522 was designated on June 30, 1976, on the current route along an old routing of US 59; the route was signed as US 59 Business rather than Loop 522.

== Loop 523 ==
State Highway Loop 523
- Location: Wharton County
- Length: 3.006 mi (4.838 km)
- Existed: June 21, 1979–present

Loop 523 is located in Wharton County. It runs from US 59, 1.3 miles (2.1 km) west of Louise to US 59, 1.8 miles (2.9 km) east of Louise.

Loop 523 was designated on June 21, 1979, on the current route.

== Loop 524 ==
State Highway Loop 524
- Location: Wharton County
- Length: 1.372 mi (2.208 km)
- Existed: June 30, 1976–present

Loop 524 is located in Wharton County. It runs from US 59 east of Hillje to US 59 west of Hillje.

Loop 524 was designated on June 30, 1976, on the current route along an old routing of US 59; the route was signed as US 59 Business rather than Loop 524.

== Loop 525 ==
State Highway Loop 525
- Location: Wharton County
- Existed: June 30, 1976–April 23, 1997

Loop 525 was designated on August 23, 1976, as a loop off US 59 in El Campo along an old routing of US 59. The route was signed as US 59 Business rather than Loop 525. On April 23, 1997, Spur 525 was cancelled and transferred to Bus. US 59.

== Loop 526 ==
State Highway Loop 526
- Location: Wharton County
- Length: 1.439 mi (2.316 km)
- Existed: June 30, 1976–present

Loop 526 is located in Wharton County. It runs from Future I-69/US 59 east of Pierce to Future I-69/US 59 west of Pierce.

Loop 526 was designated on June 30, 1976, on the current route along an old routing of US 59.

== Loop 528 ==
State Highway Loop 528
- Location: Ellis County
- Existed: August 23, 1976–June 21, 1990

Loop 528 was designated on August 23, 1976, as a loop off US 287 in Waxahachie along an old routing of US 287. The route was signed as US 287 Business rather than Loop 528. On June 21, 1990, Loop 528 was cancelled and transferred to Bus. US 287.

== Loop 530 ==
State Highway Loop 530
- Location: Bell County
- Existed: November 23, 1976–October 26, 2000

Loop 530 was designated on November 23, 1976, as a loop off US 190 in Belton along an old routing of US 190. On October 26, 2000, by district request, Loop 530 was cancelled and removed from the highway system due to the city of Belton planning utility improvements along the route.

== Loop 531 ==
State Highway Loop 531
- Location: Houston County
- Existed: January 20, 1977–July 31, 2003

Loop 531 was located in Grapeland. It is now Bus. US 287.

== Loop 532 ==
State Highway Loop 532
- Location: La Salle and Webb counties
- Existed: January 20, 1977–June 21, 1990

Loop 532 was located in Encinal. It is now Business I-35.

== Loop 533 ==
State Highway Loop 533
- Location: Palo Pinto County
- Length: 1.045 mi (1.682 km)
- Existed: May 27, 1977–present

Loop 533 is located in Palo Pinto County. Both of its termini are at SH 16.

Loop 533 was designated on May 27, 1977, on the current route along an old routing of SH 16.

== Loop 534 ==
State Highway Loop 534
- Location: Kerr County
- Length: 4.968 mi (7.995 km)
- Existed: May 2, 1977–present

Loop 534, also known as Veterans Highway, is located in Kerr County. It runs 4.968 miles (7.995 km) from SH 173 south of Kerrville north to I-10.

Loop 534 was designated on May 2, 1977, from FM 689 (now SH 173) southeast of Kerrville north to I-10. On October 23, 1978, the road was extended southeast 2.1 miles (3.4 km) to SH 16, replacing a section of FM 689 (although this section was signed as SH 173). On October 2, 1990, a 2-mile (3.2 km) section from SH 16 to the southern terminus was transferred to SH 173.

Junction list

The entire highway is in Kerrville, Kerr County.

mi	km	Destinations	Notes
0.0	0.0	SH 173 (Bandera Highway) – Bandera, Kerrville	Southern terminus
0.2	0.32	Bridge over the Guadalupe River	
0.4	0.64	SH 27 (Memorial Boulevard) – Kerrville, Center Point, Comfort	Access to Kerrville Municipal Airport
3.2	5.1	FM 1341 (Cypress Creek Road)	
4.3	6.9	SH 16 (Sidney Baker Street) to I-10 – Kerrville, Fredericksburg	
4.9	7.9	Leslie Drive	Northern terminus
1.000 mi = 1.609 km; 1.000 km = 0.621 mi

== Loop 538 ==
State Highway Loop 538
- Location: Bexar and Guadalupe counties
- Existed: January 24, 1978–June 18, 1996

Loop 538 was designated on January 24, 1978, from FM 78, 0.5 miles (0.80 km) east of SH 218, east and northeast to FM 78 near Live Oak Road (now Schertz Parkway) in Schertz. The route was never built, and was cancelled on June 18, 1996.

== Loop 539 ==
State Highway Loop 539
- Location: Guadalupe County
- Existed: January 24, 1978–November 20, 2014

Loop 539 was designated on January 24, 1978, from FM 78, 0.3 miles (0.48 km) west of FM 1103, east and northeast to FM 78 near Haeckerville Road in Cibolo. On September 26, 1996, the road was rerouted along old FM 78 through Cibolo after FM 78 was rerouted south of town. On November 20, 2014, Loop 539 was cancelled and returned to the city of Cibolo.

== Loop 540 ==
State Highway Loop 540
- Location: Fort Bend County
- Length: 3.354 mi (5.398 km)
- Existed: April 14, 1980–present

Loop 540 is located in Fort Bend County. It begins northeast of Beasley at an exit ramp off southbound Future I-69/US 59, about 0.3 miles (0.5 km) past the intersection with Daily Road. Initially one-way, it runs southwest alongside the Union Pacific Railroad tracks. Two-way traffic begins after 0.2 miles (0.3 km). The route passes through Beasley before intersecting FM 1875 southwest of the city. Loop 540 then intersects FM 360, beyond which the road again becomes one-way before transitioning into an entrance ramp for southbound Future I-69/US 59.

Loop 540 was designated on April 14, 1980, on the current route.

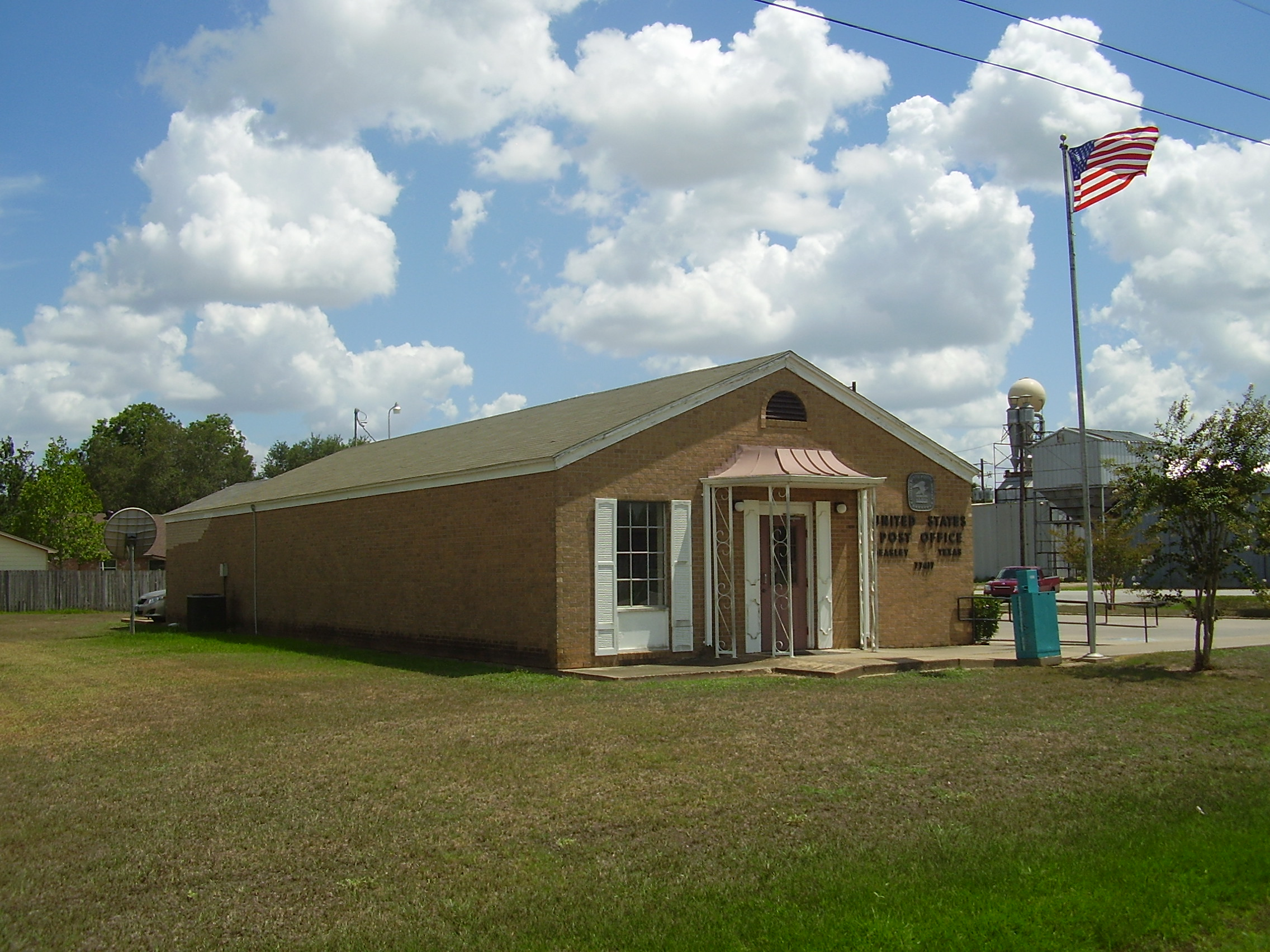
Beasley Post Office at 1st Street and Loop 540

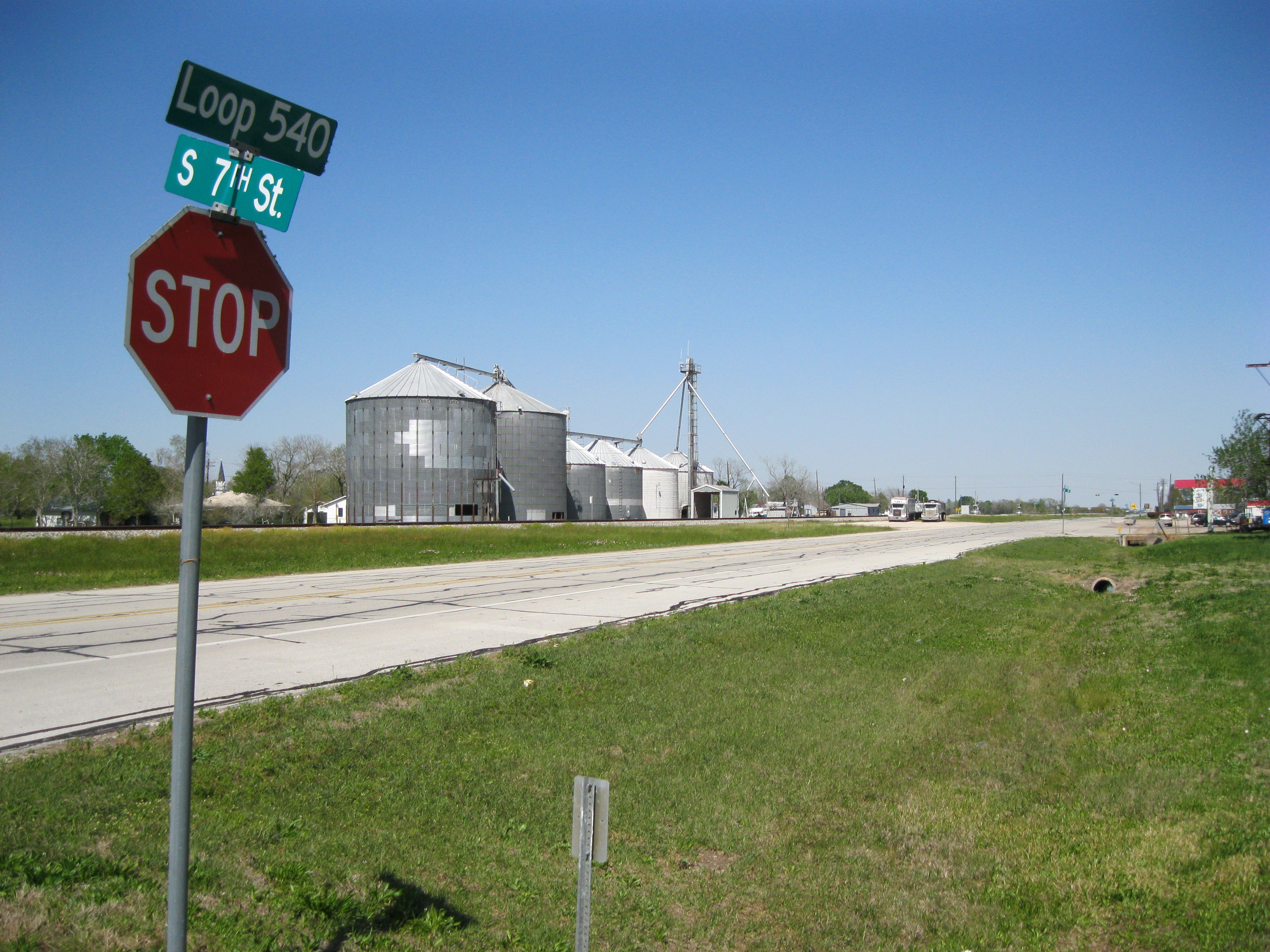
Grain storage buildings on Loop 540 in Beasley

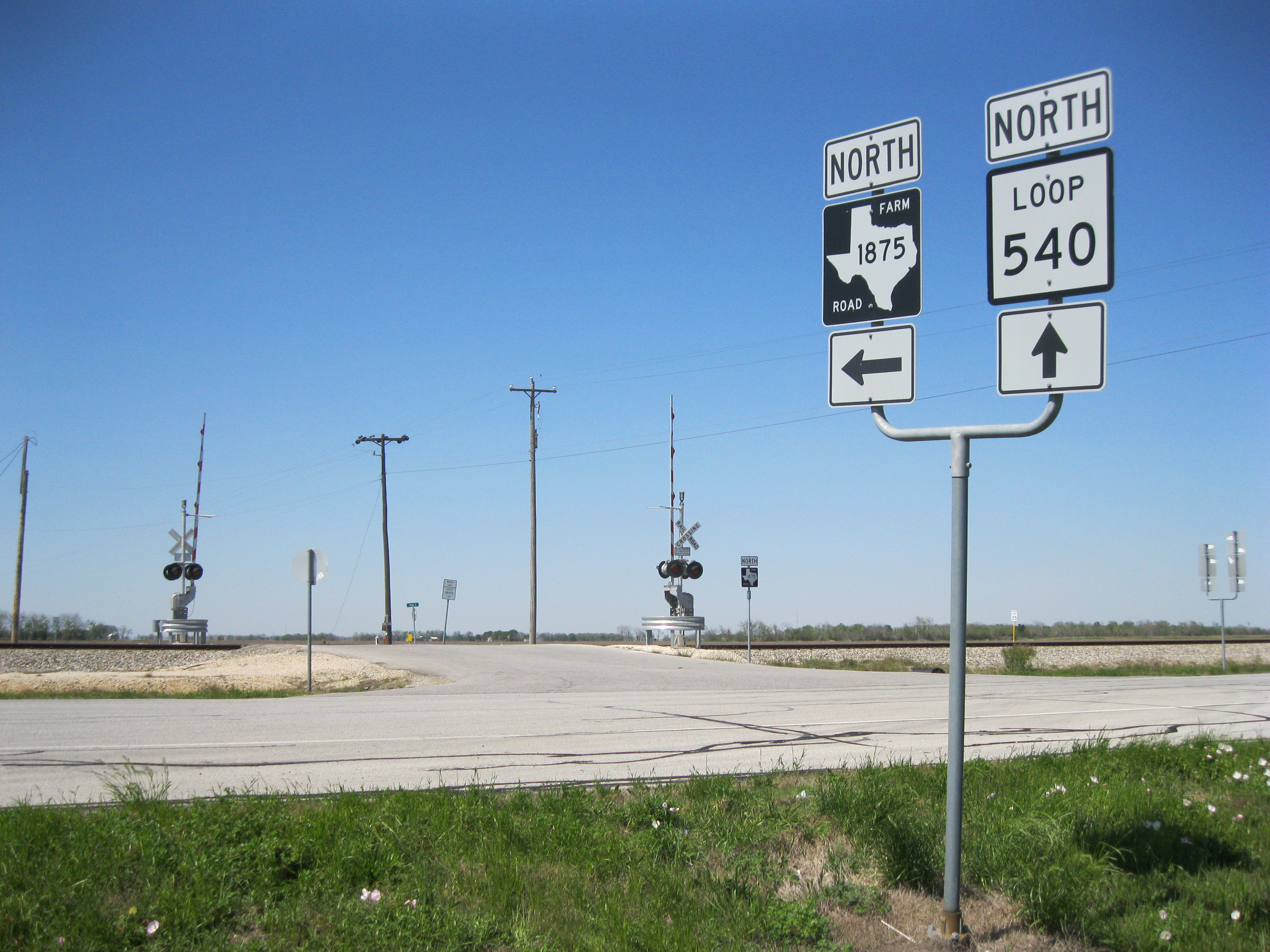
Looking northwest from Loop 540 and FM 1875

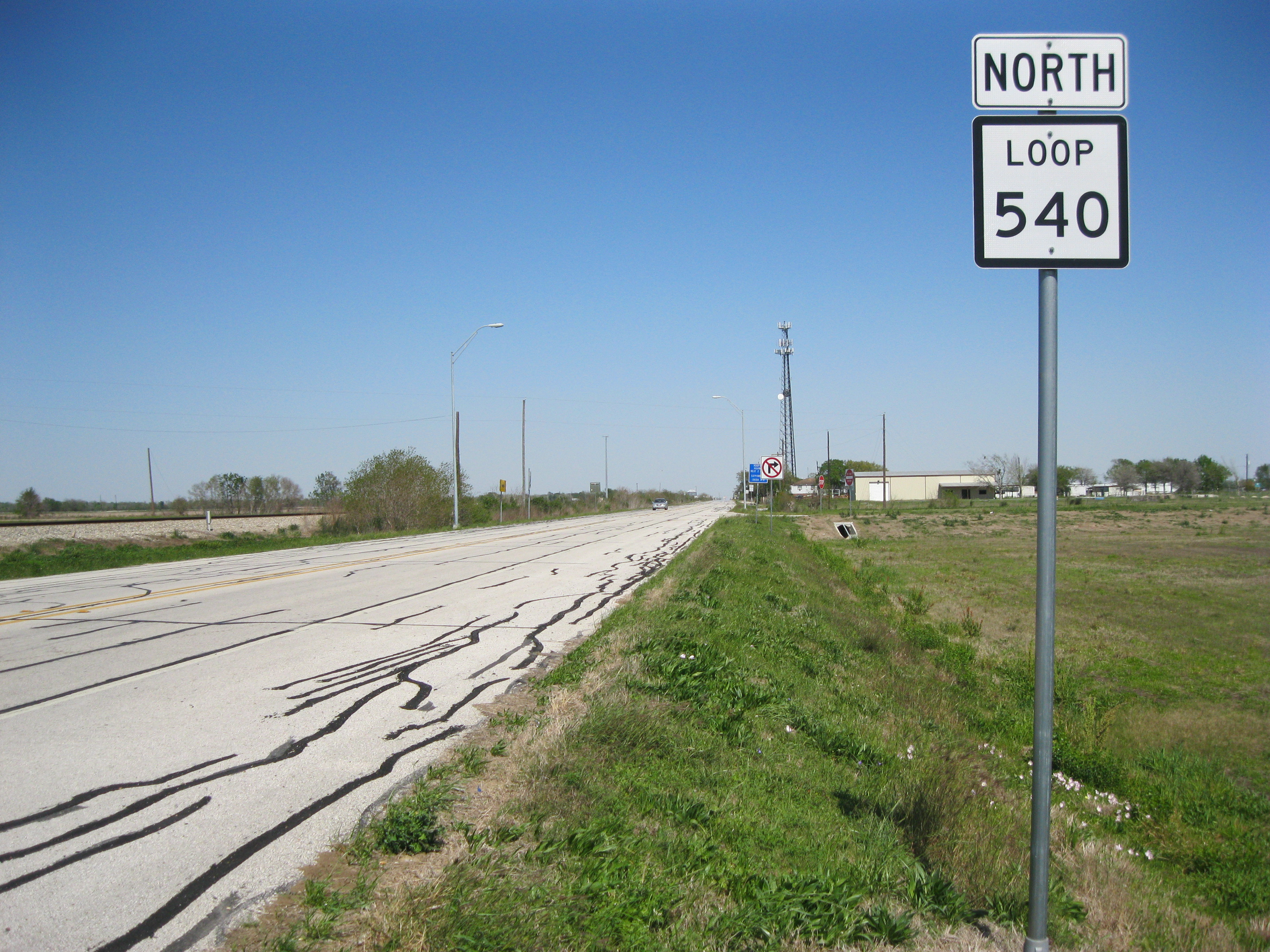
View northeast toward Beasley near Future I-69/US 59

== Loop 541 ==
State Highway Loop 541
- Location: Fort Bend County
- Length: 2.526 mi (4.065 km)
- Existed: April 14, 1980–present

Loop 541 is located in Fort Bend County. It begins northeast of Kendleton at an exit ramp off southbound Future I-69/US 59. It runs southwest along the Union Pacific Railroad tracks, intersecting FM 2919. Loop 541 continues to the southwest for another 0.6 miles (1.0 km); while the designation has the route connecting to the freeway here, it instead ends at a turnaround. A paved road goes a short distance past the turnaround before turning sharply to the northwest, connecting with Ben Williams Drive after crossing the railroad tracks.

Loop 541 was designated on April 14, 1980, on the current route.

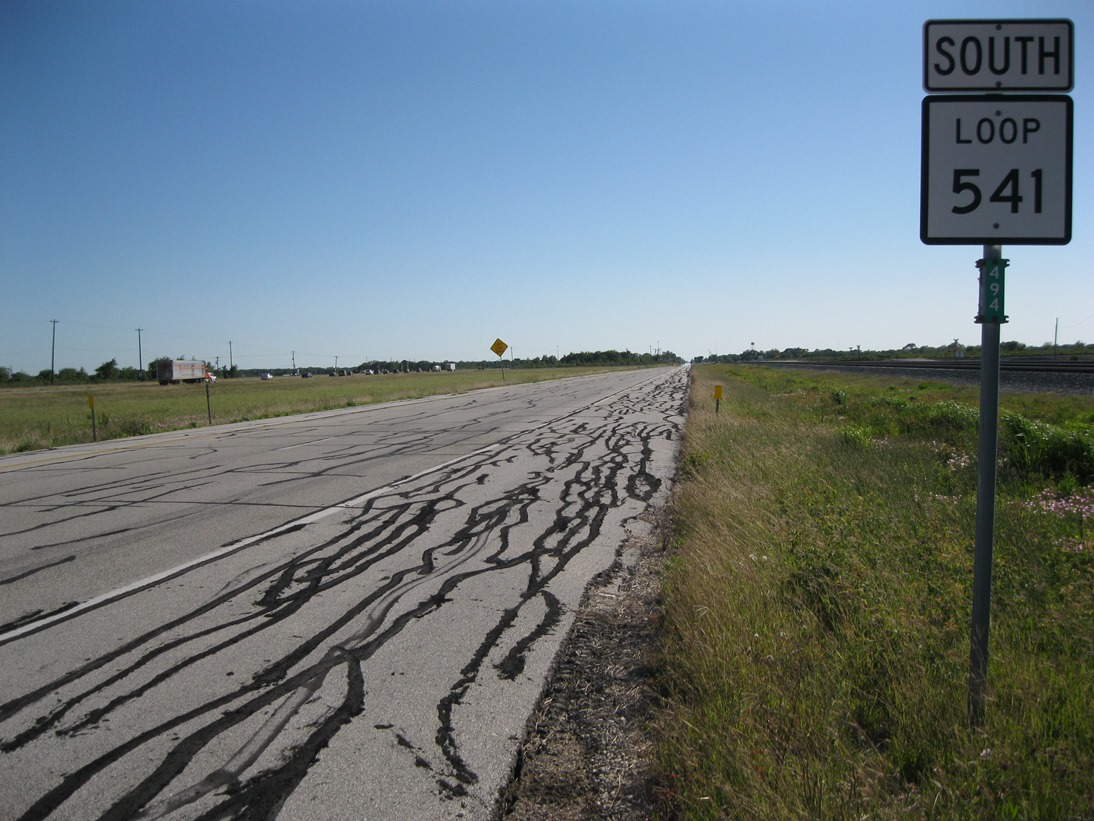
Loop 541 sign a short way southwest of the Future I-69/US 59 exit

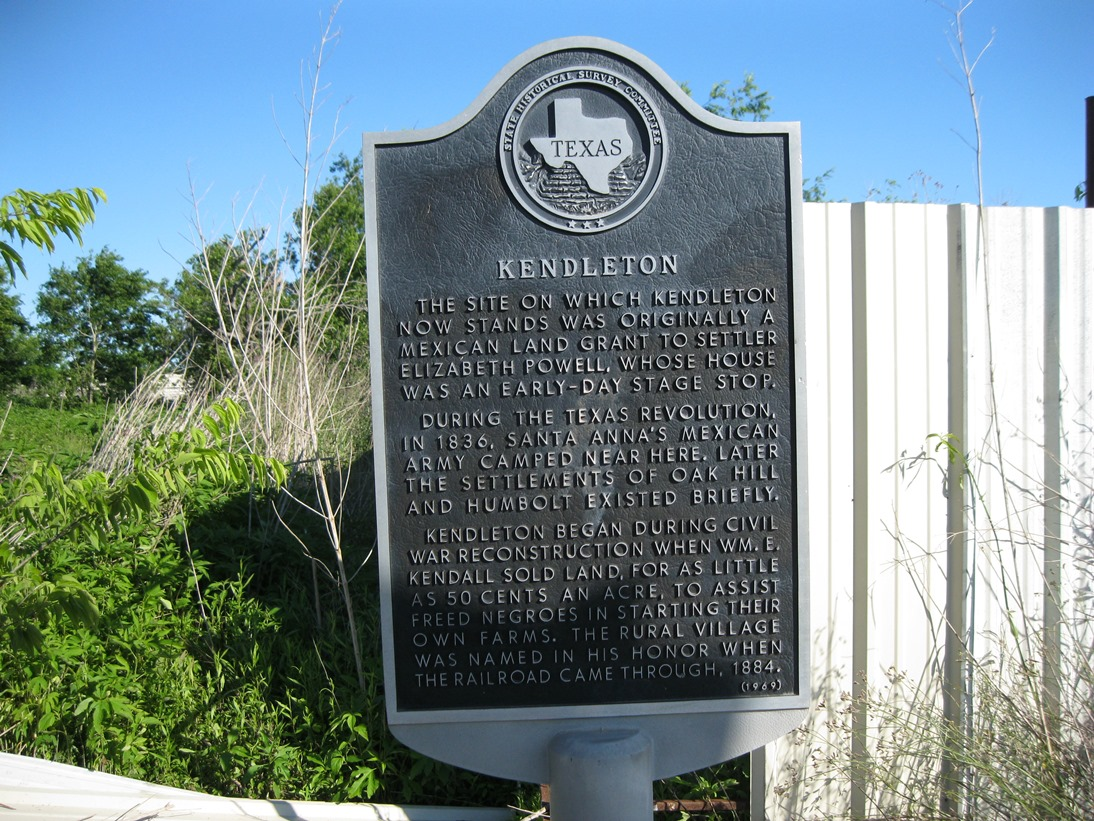
Marker on Loop 541 gives the history of Kendleton

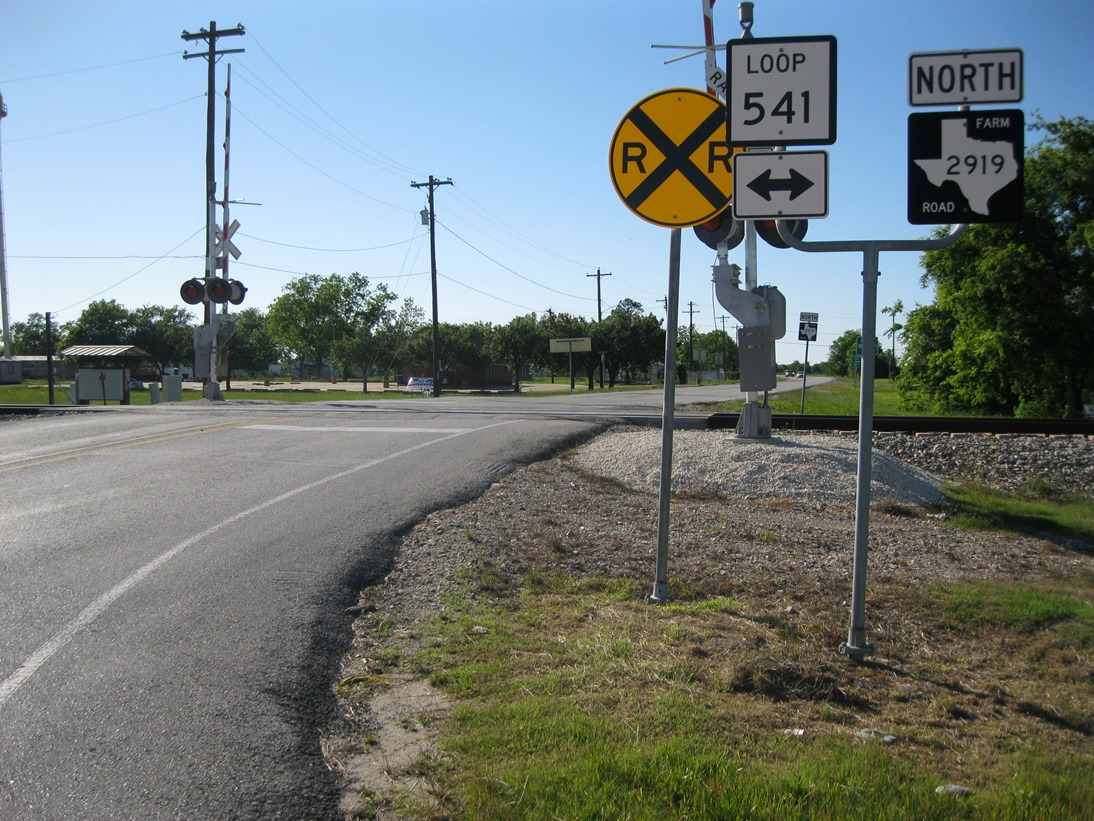
Union Pacific railroad crossing at Loop 541 and FM 2919

== Loop 543 ==
State Highway Loop 543
- Location: Fayette County
- Length: 1.665 mi (2.680 km)
- Existed: February 7, 1983–present

Loop 543 is located in Fayette County. It runs from SH 71 west of West Point to SH 71 east of West Point.

Loop 543 was designated on February 7, 1983, on the current route along an old routing of SH 71.

== Loop 544 ==
State Highway Loop 544
- Location: Nolan County
- Existed: February 23, 1983–June 21, 1990

Loop 544 was designated on February 23, 1983, as a loop off US 84 in Roscoe. On June 21, 1990, Loop 544 was cancelled and transferred to Bus. US 84.

== Loop 545 ==
State Highway Loop 545
- Location: Tom Green County
- Existed: April 20, 1984–November 21, 1996

Loop 545 was designated on April 20, 1984, from US 67 northeast 5.1 miles (8.2 km) to Main Street, then north along Main Street 0.5 mile to US 67 along an old routing of US 67. On March 29, 1988, a 1.1-mile (1.8 km) section from US 87 to FM 380 was removed and returned to the city of San Angelo. The remainder of Loop 545 was cancelled on November 21, 1996, and transferred to Bus. US 67.

== Loop 546 ==
State Highway Loop 546
- Location: Midland County
- Existed: April 9, 1984–June 21, 1990

Loop 546 was designated on April 9, 1984, from Loop 250 east and south 3.5 miles (5.6 km) to Wall Avenue, then east 1.3 miles (2.1 km) along Wall Avenue to SH 349 (now Bus. SH 349), then south along SH 349 to Florida Avenue, then southeast 2.5 miles (4.0 km) along Florida Avenue and Garden City Highway to I-20/SH 158 along an old routing of SH 158. On June 21, 1990, Loop 546 was cancelled and transferred to Bus. SH 158.

== Loop 547 ==
State Highway Loop 547
- Location: San Augustine County
- Length: 1.222 mi (1.967 km)
- Existed: July 24, 1984–present

Loop 547 is located in San Augustine County. Both of its termini are at SH 21 within the San Augustine city limits.

Loop 547 was designated on July 24, 1984, on its current route. It is a former routing of SH 21.

== Loop 549 ==
State Highway Loop 549
- Location: Nolan County
- Existed: September 27, 1985–June 21, 1990

Loop 549 was designated on September 27, 1985, from SH 70, 2 miles (3.2 km) west of Sweetwater, south 2 miles (3.2 km) to Loop 432 (now Business I-20). The route was signed, but not designated, as SH 70. Loop 549 was cancelled on June 21, 1990, as the SH 70 designation became official.

== Loop 550 ==
State Highway Loop 550
- Location: Oldham County
- Existed: April 18, 1985–June 21, 1990

Loop 550 was designated on April 18, 1985, as a loop off I-40 in Adrian along an old routing of US 66. On June 21, 1990, Loop 550 was cancelled and transferred to Business I-40-B.

== Loop 551 ==
State Highway Loop 551
- Location: Oldham County
- Existed: April 18, 1985–June 21, 1990

Loop 551 was designated on April 18, 1985, as a loop off I-40 in Vega along an old routing of US 66. On June 21, 1990, Loop 551 was cancelled and transferred to Business I-40-C.

== Loop 552 ==
State Highway Loop 552
- Location: Potter and Carson counties
- Existed: April 18, 1985–October 25, 1990

Loop 552 was designated on April 18, 1985, from I-40 west of Amarillo east, north, and east 9 miles (14 km) to US 60/US 87, then east and northeast 10.8 miles (17.4 km) along US 60 to its intersection with Loop 552, then southeast 4.6 miles (7.4 km) to I-40 along an old routing of US 66. On October 25, 1990, Loop 552 was cancelled and transferred to Business I-40-D.

== Loop 554 ==
State Highway Loop 554
- Location: Carson and Gray counties
- Existed: April 18, 1985–June 21, 1990

Loop 554 was designated on April 18, 1985, as a loop off I-40 in Groom along an old routing of US 66. On June 21, 1990, Loop 554 was cancelled and transferred to Business I-40-F.

== Loop 555 ==
State Highway Loop 555
- Location: Gray County
- Existed: April 18, 1985–June 21, 1990

Loop 555 was designated on April 18, 1985, as a loop off I-40 in McLean along an old routing of US 66. On June 21, 1990, Loop 555 was cancelled and transferred to Business I-40-H.

== Loop 556 ==
State Highway Loop 556
- Location: Wheeler County
- Existed: April 18, 1985–March 24, 1993

Loop 556 was designated on April 18, 1985, as a loop off I-40 in Shamrock along an old routing of US 66. On March 24, 1993, Loop 556 was cancelled and transferred to Business I-40-J.

== Loop 558 ==
State Highway Loop 558
- Location: Brazoria County
- Existed: January 15, 1986–September 29, 1992

Loop 558 was designated on January 15, 1986, from SH 35 southwest and west 4.9 miles (7.9 km) to the intersection of SH 35 and SH 288. On February 25, 1987, the route was transferred to SH 35 and Loop 558 was reassigned to an old routing of SH 35 from SH 288 east 3.7 miles (6.0 km) to SH 35. Loop 558 was cancelled on September 29, 1992, and transferred to FM 523.

== Loop 560 ==
State Highway Loop 560
- Location: Ellis and Dallas counties
- Existed: January 28, 1987–June 21, 1990

Loop 560 was located in Ellis and Dallas counties. It was the former alignment of US 75 through Ferris. It is now Business I-45.

== Loop 561 ==
State Highway Loop 561
- Location: Ellis County
- Length: 0.936 mi (1,506 m)
- Existed: January 28, 1987–present

Loop 561 is located in Ellis County. It is the former alignment of US 75 through Trumbull. Both of its termini are at I-45.

Loop 561 was designated on January 28, 1987, on the current route.

== Loop 562 ==
State Highway Loop 562
- Location: Ellis County
- Existed: January 28, 1987–June 21, 1990

Loop 562 was located in Ellis County. It was the former alignment of US 75 through Palmer. It is now Business I-45.

== Loop 564 ==
State Highway Loop 564
- Location: Wood County
- Length: 9.800 mi (15.772 km)
- Existed: March 25, 2010–present

Loop 564 encircles Mineola.

Loop 564 was designated on March 25, 2010, on the current route as a replacement of FM 564.

=== Loop 564 (1987) ===
State Highway Loop 564
- Location: Navarro County
- Existed: January 28, 1987–June 21, 1990

A previous route designated Loop 564 was located in Navarro County. It was the former alignment of US 75 through Corsicana. It is now Business I-45.

== Loop 566 ==
State Highway Loop 566
- Location: Haskell and Jones counties
- Existed: May 2, 1988–June 21, 1990

Loop 566 was designated on May 2, 1988, from US 287/SH 283, south along SH 6, then west to US 277 along an old routing of US 277. On June 21, 1990, Loop 566 was cancelled and transferred to Bus. US 277.

== Loop 567 ==
State Highway Loop 567
- Location: Hood County
- Length: 4.035 mi (6.494 km)
- Existed: November 25, 1986–present

Loop 567 is located in Hood County. It runs from US 377 west of Granbury to Bus. US 377 east of Granbury.

Loop 567 was designated on November 25, 1986, from US 377 west of Granbury northeast to FM 51 north of town. On May 25, 2000, by district request, the road was extended 2.25 miles (3.62 km) east and south to Bus. US 377.

== Loop 569 ==
State Highway Loop 569
- Location: Wise County
- Existed: April 23, 1987–June 21, 1990

Loop 569 was designated on April 23, 1987, as a loop off US 380 in Decatur along an old routing of US 380. On June 21, 1990, Loop 569 was cancelled and transferred to Bus. US 380.

== Loop 570 ==
State Highway Loop 570
- Location: Tom Green County
- Length: 1.903 mi (3.063 km)
- Existed: March 19, 1990–present

Loop 570 is located in Tom Green County. It is the former route of US 87 through Wall.

== Loop 571 ==
State Highway Loop 571
- Location: Rusk County
- Length: 5.902 mi (9.498 km)
- Existed: September 29, 1987–present

Loop 571 is located in Rusk County. It runs from US 259 north of Henderson to US 79 south of Henderson.

Loop 571 was designated on September 29, 1987, on the current route as a replacement of FM 454.

== Loop 573 ==
State Highway Loop 573
- Location: Liberty County
- Length: 3.159 mi (5.084 km)
- Existed: December 31, 1987–present

Loop 573 is located in Liberty County. It runs from I-69/US 59 north of Cleveland to I-69/US 59 south of Cleveland.

Loop 573 was designated on December 31, 1987, on the current route along an old routing of US 59.

== Loop 574 ==
State Highway Loop 574
- Location: McLennan County
- Length: 1.500 mi (2.414 km)
- Existed: December 21, 1987–present

Loop 574 is located in McLennan County. It runs from I-35 to Loop 484.

Loop 574 was designated on December 21, 1987, on the current route.

== Loop 577 ==
State Highway Loop 577
- Location: Concho County
- Length: 1.063 mi (1.711 km)
- Existed: October 6, 1991–present

Loop 577 is located in Concho County. It is the former route of US 87 through Vick.

== Loop 590 ==
State Highway Loop 590
- Location: Cameron County
- Existed: April 26, 1989–December 21, 1994

Loop 590 was designated on April 26, 1989, from US 77 south and southwest 13.9 miles (22.4 km) along Helen Moore Road (now Paso Real Highway) to US 77/US 83 (now I-69E). On December 21, 1994, Loop 590 was cancelled and redesignated as FM 509 to provide a continuous route for FM 509.

== Loop 592 ==
State Highway Loop 592
- Location: Bell County
- Length: 0.700 mi (1,127 m)
- Existed: May 24, 1990–present

Loop 592 is located in Bell County. It runs from US 190/I-14 east of Nolanville to US 190/I-14 at Paddy Hamilton Road. The route is unsigned.

Loop 592 was designated on May 24, 1990, on the current route.

== Loop 593 ==
State Highway Loop 593
- Location: Hunt County
- Existed: January 29, 1991–July 15, 1992

Loop 593 was a proposed route in Hunt County. It was designated on January 29, 1991, from US 69 in Greenville south and east 5.2 miles (8.4 km) to SH 34. However, the city of Greenville rejected construction of the route, and the designation was cancelled on July 15, 1992.

== Loop 635 ==
State Highway Loop 635
- Location: Dallas and Tarrant counties
- Existed: April 1, 1968–July 31, 1974

Loop 635 was located in Dallas and Tarrant counties. It was the temporary designation for the northwestern segment of I-635 from 1968 to 1974.

== Loop 820 ==
State Highway Loop 820
- Location: Tarrant County
- Existed: April 18, 1963–July 13, 1977

Loop 820 was located in Tarrant County. It was the temporary designation for segments of I-820 from 1963 to 1977.

== Loop 1604 ==
State Highway Loop 1604
- Location: Bexar County
- Length: 94.387 mi (151.901 km)
- Existed: June 30, 1977–present

Loop 1604 serves as the outer highway loop of San Antonio. At nearly 95 miles (153 km) in length, Loop 1604 is the longest state highway loop in Texas.

Loop 1604 was designated on June 30, 1977, after FM 1604 was combined with a large portion of FM 1518 to complete a larger loop around San Antonio. Three bypasses were completed in the early 1980s: on December 12, 1979, FM 1937 was extended to replace a bypassed portion near Losoya; on March 3, 1981, FM 327 was designated as the through route when Loop 1604 was rerouted around Elmendorf; and in 1983, Loop 1604 was routed around Lone Oak, creating FM 3465 over the previous routing.

== Loop 1853 ==
State Highway Loop 1853
- Location: Madison County
- Length: 7.3 mi (11.7 km)
- Existed: April 30, 2020–present

Loop 1853 is a proposed loop around the south side of Madisonville as a relief route for SH 21, which is routed through the city. It is proposed to run from US 190/SH 21, 0.7 miles (1.1 km) east of FM 1452, to another point on SH 21, 0.4 miles (0.6 km) west of FM 2346, but on November 14, 2024, the route was shortened to IH 45 instead of continuing east to SH 21. US 190 would also be rerouted off of SH 21 and IH 45 onto Loop 1853.

Loop 1853 is expected to have two lanes in each direction with four overpasses, at SH 90, SH 75, I-45, and a city-owned road. TxDOT projects construction to begin in 2026.

The number was chosen to commemorate the year that Madison County was established.
