= Beasley, Texas =

- City
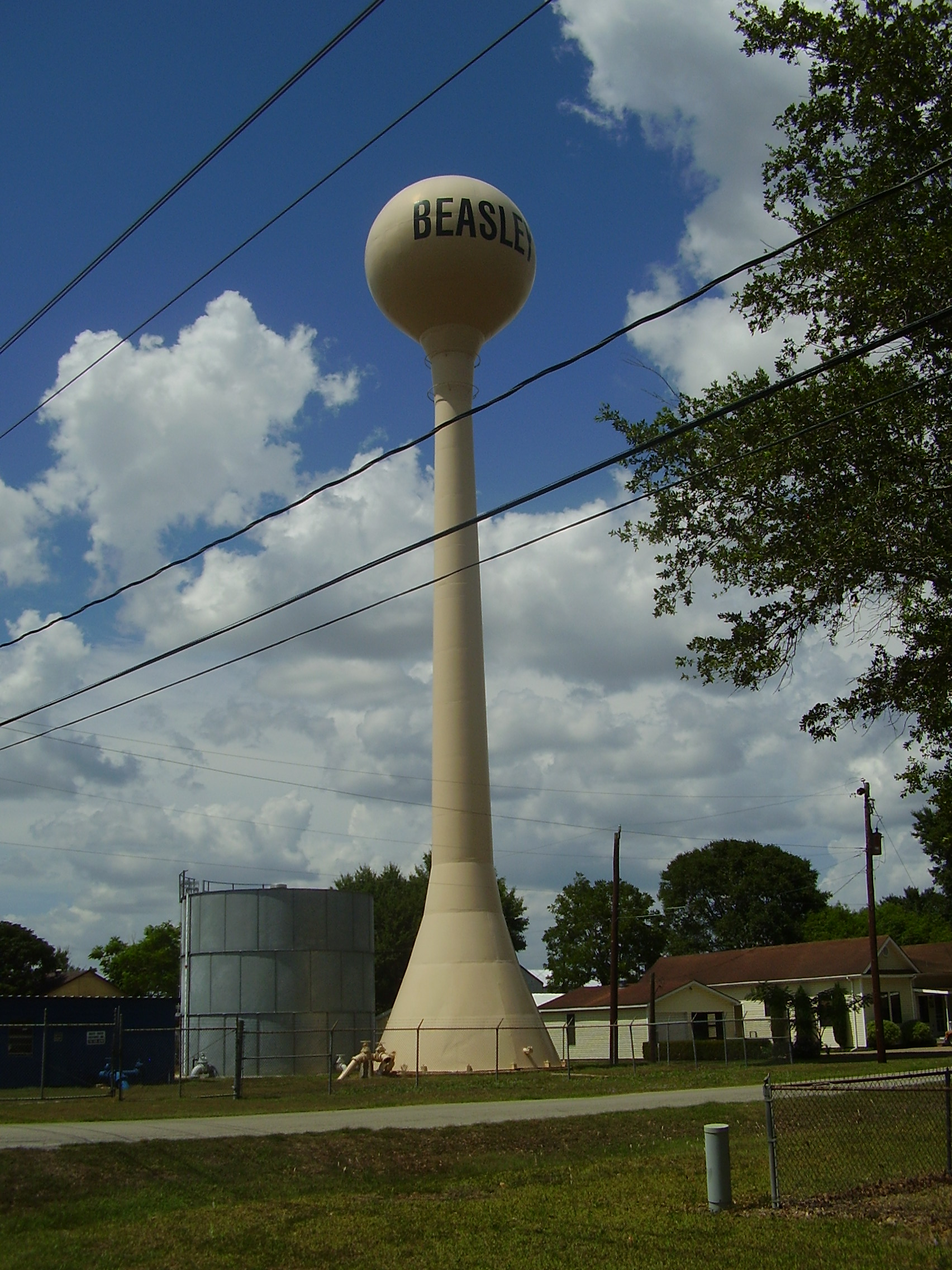
- Water tower
- Interactive map of Beasley, Texas
- Coordinates: 29°29′47″N 95°55′2″W
- Country: United States
- State: Texas
- County: Fort Bend

Area
  - Total: 1.04 sq mi (2.69 km^{2})
  - Land: 1.03 sq mi (2.67 km^{2})
  - Water: 0.0039 sq mi (0.01 km^{2})
- Elevation: 108 ft (33 m)

Population (2020)
  - Total: 608
  - Estimate (2019): 677
  - Density: 655.7/sq mi (253.15/km^{2})
- Time zone: UTC-6 (Central (CST))
  - Summer (DST): UTC-5 (CDT)
- ZIP code: 77417
- Area code: 979
- FIPS code: 48-06272
- GNIS feature ID: 1330260
- Website: https://www.cityofbeasley.com/

Beasley is a city in Fort Bend County, Texas, United States, within the Houston–Sugar Land metropolitan area. As of the 2020 census, Beasley had a population of 608. State Highway Loop 540 goes straight through the city from the northeast to the southwest while U.S. Route 59, the Southwest Freeway, passes to the south of Beasley. The Union Pacific Railroad tracks run parallel with Loop 540.

== Geography ==
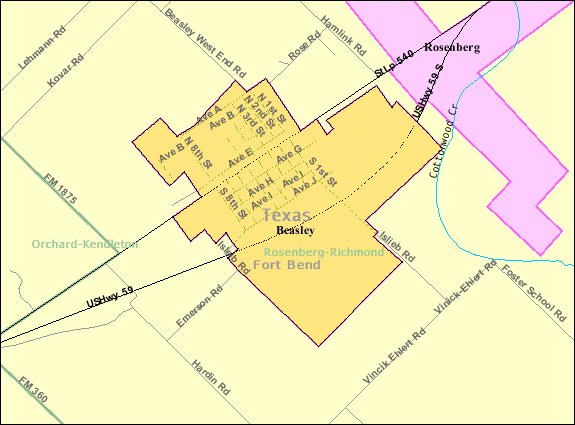
Map of Beasley

Beasley is located in west-central Fort Bend County at 29°29′47″N 95°55′2″W (29.496435, –95.917297). US 59 leads northeast 20 miles (32 km) to Sugar Land and 40 miles (64 km) to the center of Houston, while in the other direction leading 85 miles (137 km) southwest to Victoria. Rosenberg is 8 miles (13 km) to the northeast via US 59 and Texas State Highway Spur 529.

According to the United States Census Bureau, Beasley has a total area of 1.1 square miles (2.8 km^{2}), of which 0.004 square miles (0.01 km^{2}), or 0.25%, is water.

== Demographics ==
Historical population
Census	Pop.	Note	%±
1980	410		—
1990	485		18.3%
2000	590		21.6%
2010	641		8.6%
2020	608		−5.1%
U.S. Decennial Census

=== Racial and ethnic composition ===
Beasley city, Texas – Racial and ethnic composition Note: the US Census treats Hispanic/Latino as an ethnic category. This table excludes Latinos from the racial categories and assigns them to a separate category. Hispanics/Latinos may be of any race.
Race / Ethnicity (NH = Non-Hispanic)	Pop 2000	Pop 2010	Pop 2020	% 2000	% 2010	% 2020
White alone (NH)	361	257	214	61.19%	40.09%	35.20%
Black or African American alone (NH)	39	45	34	6.61%	7.02%	5.59%
Native American or Alaska Native alone (NH)	0	0	2	0.00%	0.00%	0.33%
Asian alone (NH)	0	2	1	0.00%	0.31%	0.16%
Native Hawaiian or Pacific Islander alone (NH)	0	0	0	0.00%	0.00%	0.00%
Other race alone (NH)	0	2	2	0.00%	0.31%	0.33%
Mixed race or Multiracial (NH)	9	1	10	1.53%	0.16%	1.64%
Hispanic or Latino (any race)	181	334	345	30.68%	52.11%	56.74%
Total	590	641	608	100.00%	100.00%	100.00%

=== 2020 census ===
As of the 2020 census, Beasley had a population of 608. The median age was 35.9 years, 28.5% of residents were under the age of 18, and 14.8% of residents were 65 years of age or older; for every 100 females there were 99.3 males, and for every 100 females age 18 and over there were 96.8 males age 18 and over.

0% of residents lived in urban areas, while 100.0% lived in rural areas.

There were 208 households in Beasley, of which 47.1% had children under the age of 18 living in them. Of all households, 50.5% were married-couple households, 14.4% were households with a male householder and no spouse or partner present, and 29.8% were households with a female householder and no spouse or partner present. About 15.4% of all households were made up of individuals and 3.3% had someone living alone who was 65 years of age or older.

There were 227 housing units, of which 8.4% were vacant. Among occupied housing units, 65.9% were owner-occupied and 34.1% were renter-occupied. The homeowner vacancy rate was 0.7% and the rental vacancy rate was 6.6%.

Racial composition as of the 2020 census
Race	Percent
White	49.3%
Black or African American	5.6%
American Indian and Alaska Native	0.8%
Asian	0.2%
Native Hawaiian and Other Pacific Islander	0%
Some other race	15.6%
Two or more races	28.5%
Hispanic or Latino (of any race)	56.7%

=== 2000 census ===
As of the census of 2000, there were 590 people, 216 households, and 155 families residing in the city. The population density was 587.9 inhabitants per square mile (227.0/km^{2}). There were 232 housing units at an average density of 231.2 per square mile (89.3/km^{2}). The racial makeup of the city was 77.97% White, 6.61% African American, 12.71% from other races, and 2.71% from two or more races. Hispanic or Latino of any race were 30.68% of the population.

There were 216 households, out of which 35.6% had children under the age of 18 living with them, 56.9% were married couples living together, 10.6% had a female householder with no husband present, and 28.2% were non-families. 24.1% of all households were made up of individuals, and 7.9% had someone living alone who was 65 years of age or older. The average household size was 2.73 and the average family size was 3.28.

In the city, the population was spread out, with 28.3% under the age of 18, 8.6% from 18 to 24, 28.3% from 25 to 44, 23.4% from 45 to 64, and 11.4% who were 65 years of age or older. The median age was 36 years. For every 100 females, there were 98.0 males. For every 100 females age 18 and over, there were 91.4 males.

The median income for a household in the city was $35,000, and the median income for a family was $47,625. Males had a median income of $30,139 versus $29,107 for females. The per capita income for the city was $14,984. About 5.7% of families and 16.2% of the population were below the poverty line, including 18.9% of those under age 18 and 24.1% of those age 65 or over.

== Government and infrastructure ==
The United States Postal Service Beasley Post Office is located at 7031 Loop 540. Kansas City Southern and CenterPoint Properties jointly own the 689-acre CenterPoint Intermodal Center-Houston Metro (CIC-HM), which opened in 2009.

Fort Bend County does not have a hospital district. OakBend Medical Center serves as the county's charity hospital which the county contracts with.

== Economy ==
The largest employer in the Beasley area is Hudson Products Corporation, which established manufacturing operations in 1973 on approximately 260 acres, located two miles west of Beasley.

== Education ==
Residents are zoned to Lamar Consolidated Independent School District.

Residents are zoned to:

- Becerra Elementary School
- Navarro Middle School
- George Junior High School
- B. F. Terry High School

In 2017 Beasley Elementary had about 450 students. Beasley Elementary opened in 1902, with eight students. The parent teacher organization opened in 1918. The school became a part of LCISD in 1947. A new building opened in 1985. In 2026 LCISD converted the school into Bright Futures Academy at Beasley Elementary, a district-wide special school for autistic students.

The designated community college for LCISD is Wharton County Junior College.

== Religion ==
The headquarters of the Malankara Orthodox Diocese of Southwest America are in unincorporated Fort Bend County, with a postal address of Beasley.

== Gallery ==
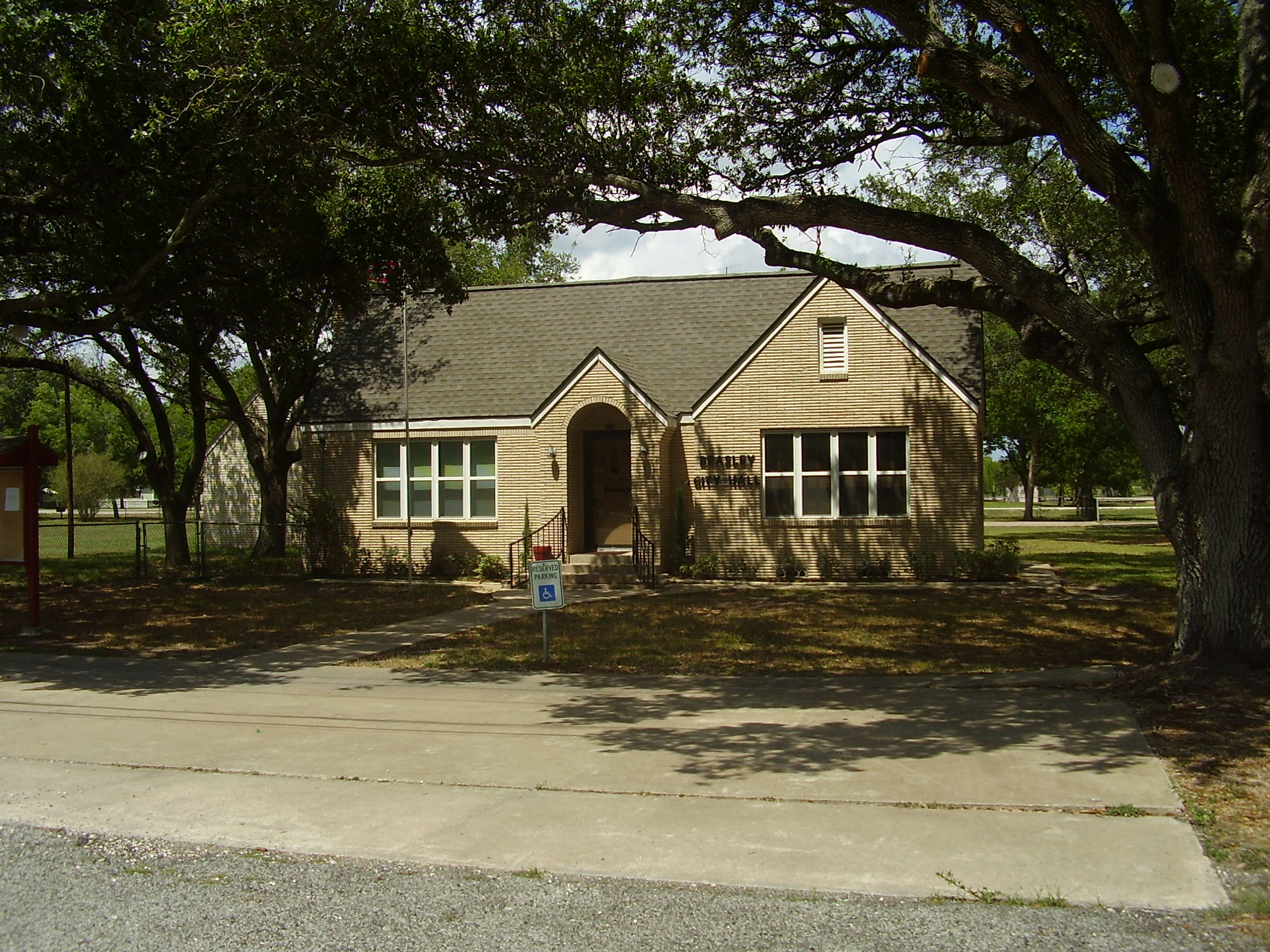
Beasley City Hall

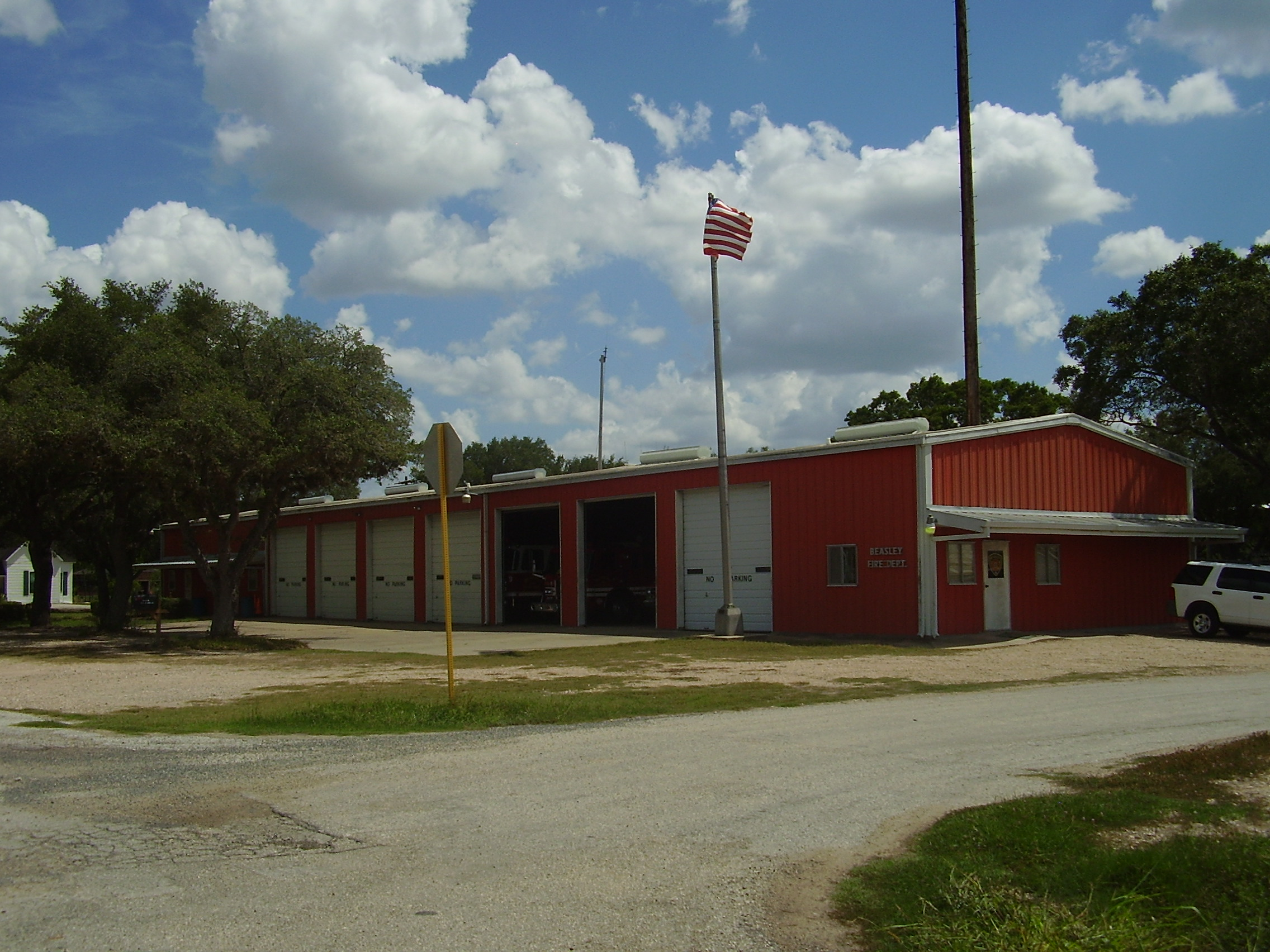
Beasley Fire Station

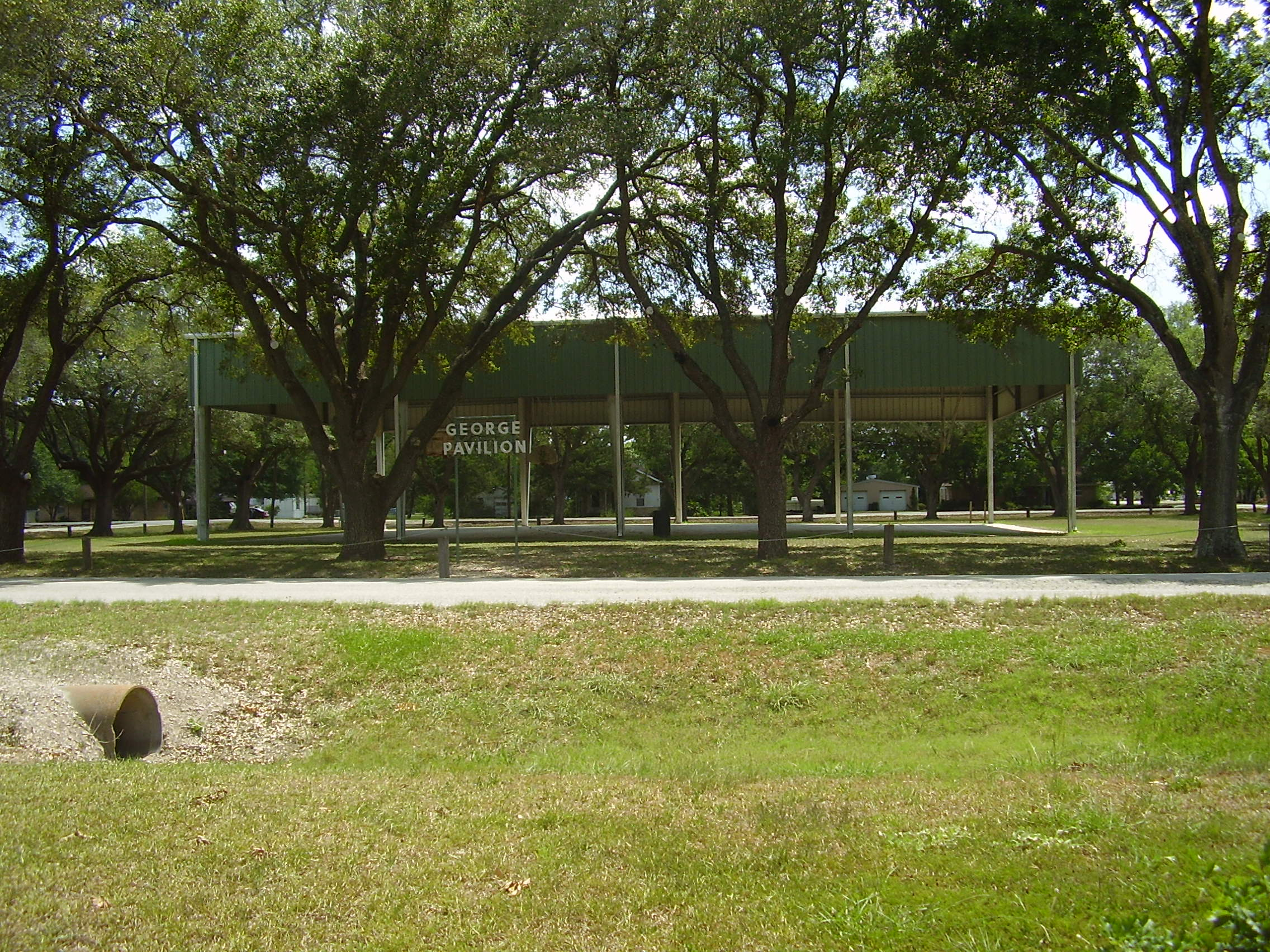
George Pavilion

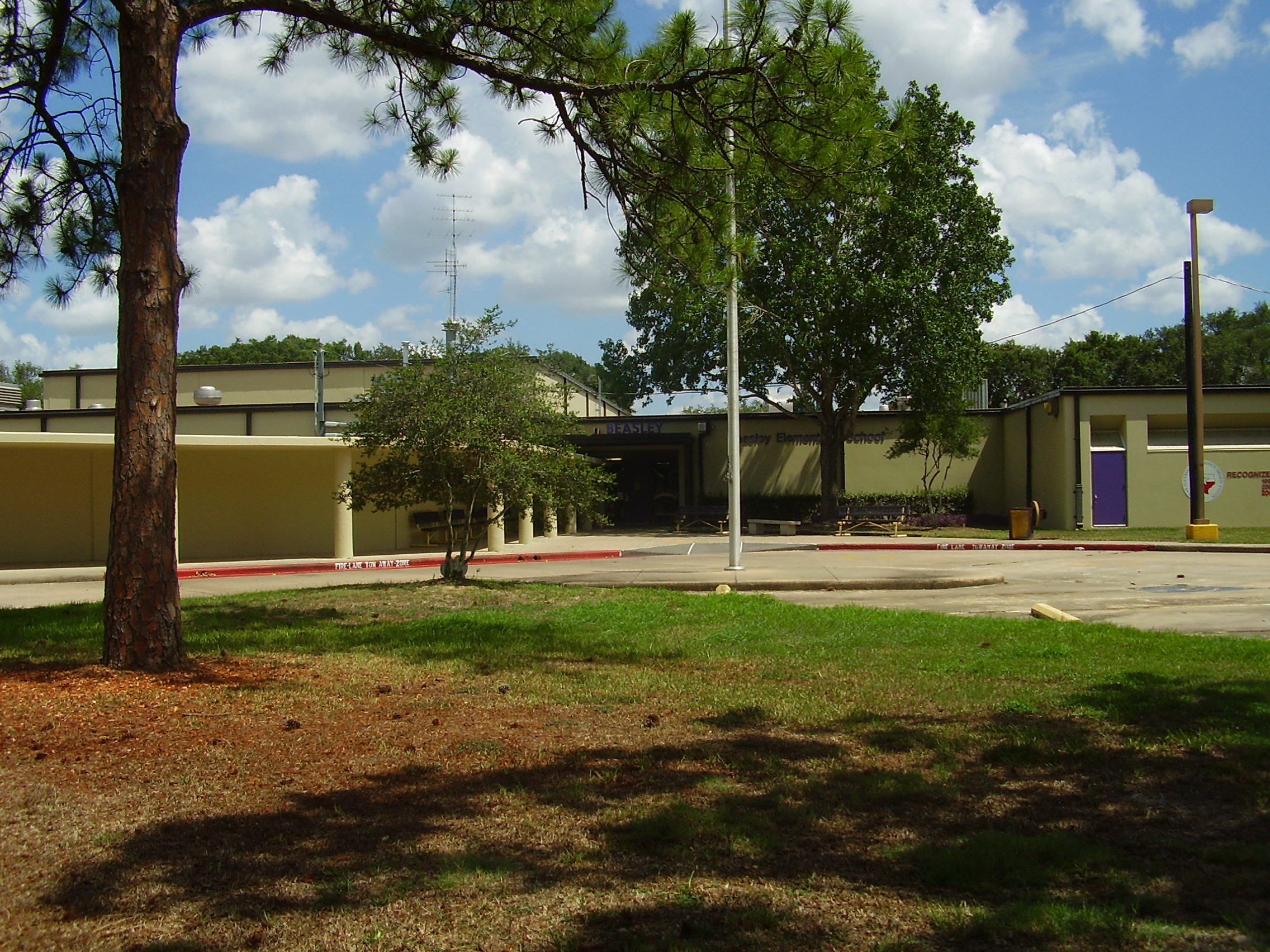
Beasley Elementary School

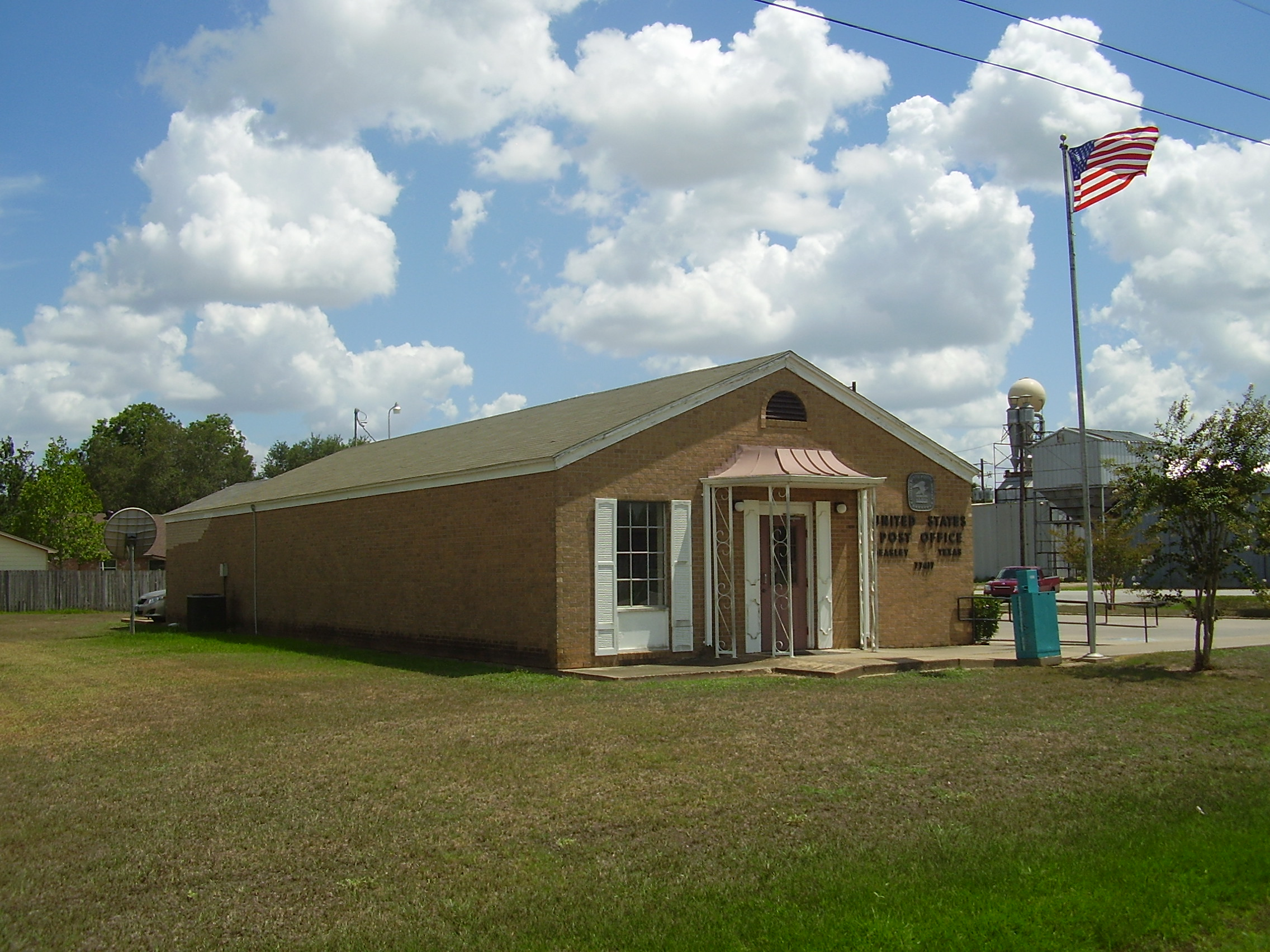
Beasley Post Office

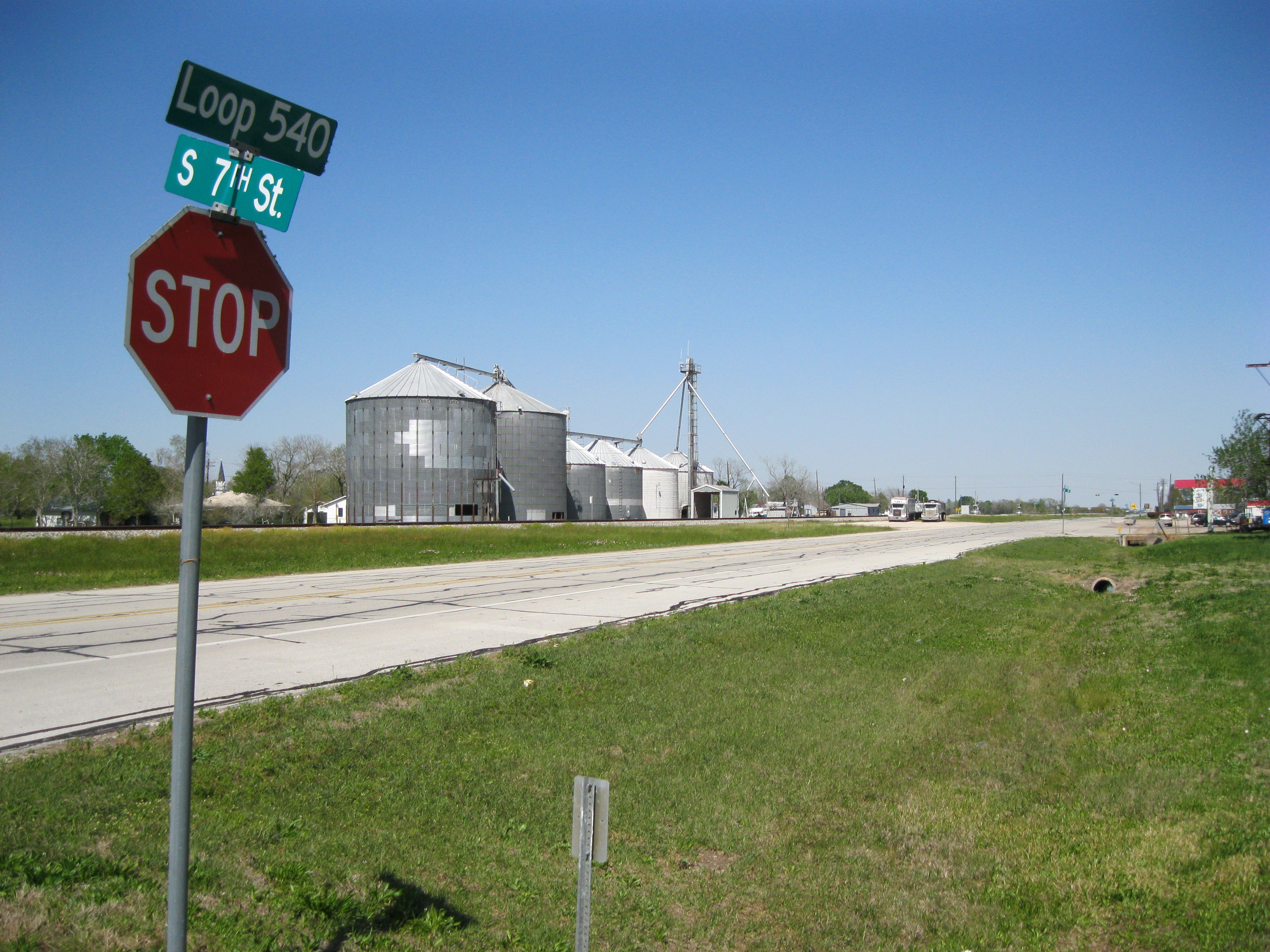
Grain storage buildings on Loop 540

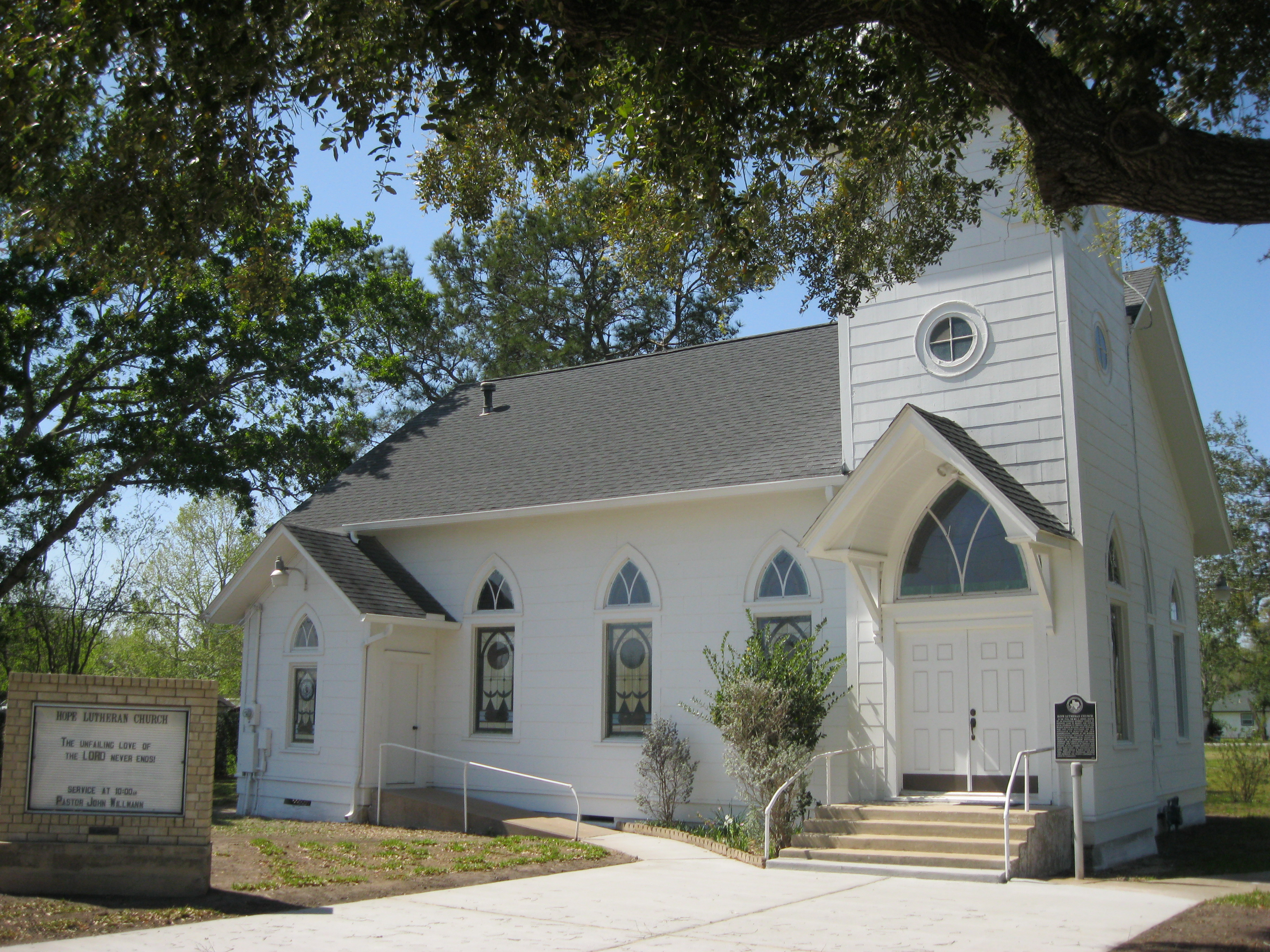
Hope Lutheran Church at 3rd St and Avenue C

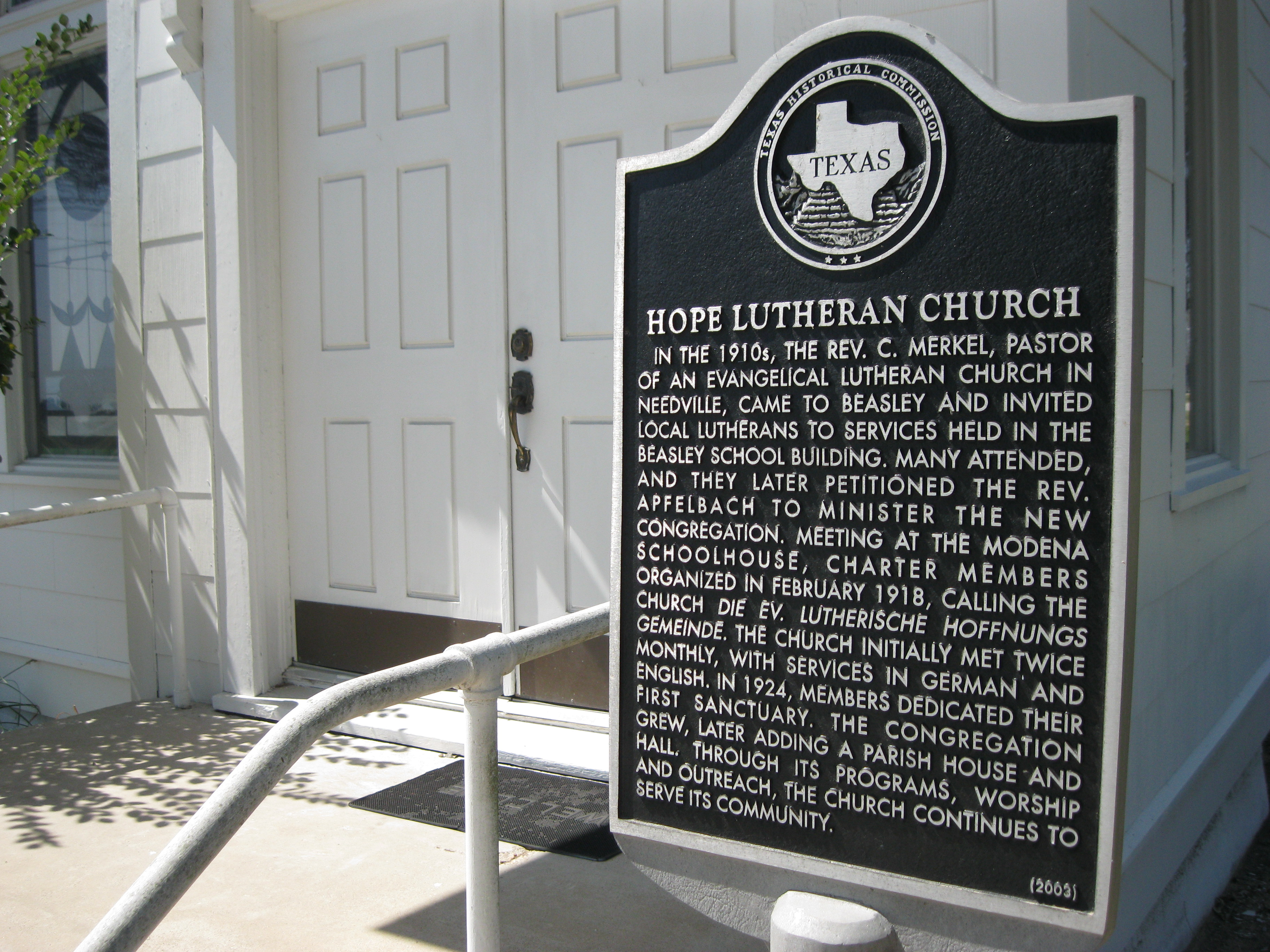
State Historical Marker at Hope Lutheran

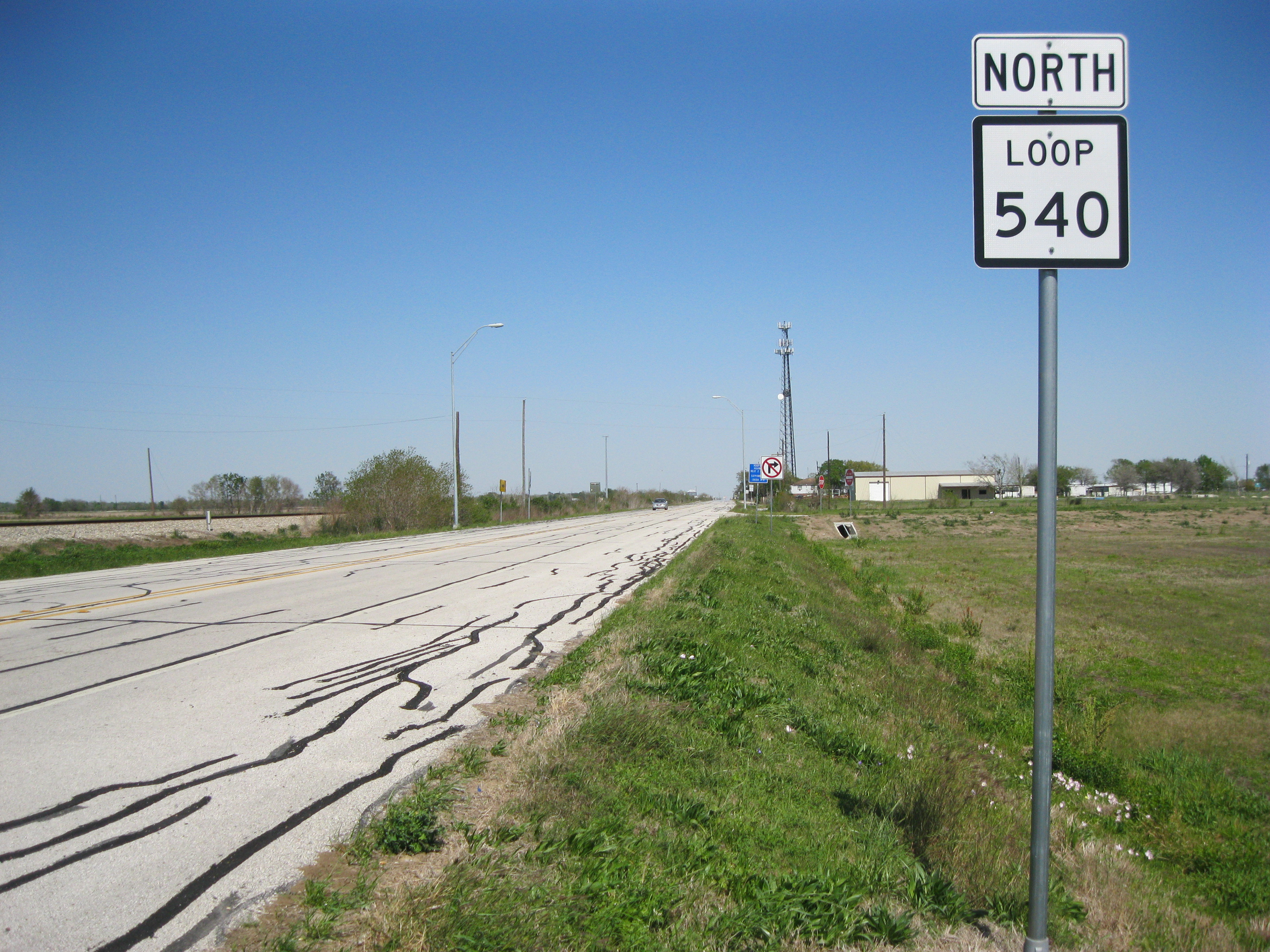
View northeast toward town on Loop 540 near US 59
