= List of state highway loops in Texas =

- Texas Loop Highway markers

Highway names
- Interstates: Interstate X (I-X); Interstate Highway X (IH-X)
- US Highways: U.S. Highway X (US X)
- State: State Highway X (SH X)
- Loops: Loop X
- Spurs: Spur X
- Recreational: Recreational Road X (RE X)
- Farm or Ranch to Market Roads: Farm to Market Road X (FM X); Ranch to Market Road X (RM X)
- Park Roads: Park Road X (PR X)

System links
- Highways in Texas; Interstate; US; State; Former; Toll; Loops; Spurs; FM/RM; Park; Rec

State highway loops in Texas are owned and maintained by the Texas Department of Transportation (TxDOT).

== List ==
- List of state highway loops in Texas (1–99)
- List of state highway loops in Texas (100–199)
- List of state highway loops in Texas (200–299)
- List of state highway loops in Texas (300–399)
- List of state highway loops in Texas (400–499)
- List of state highway loops in Texas (500–9999)

== See also ==
- List of state highway spurs in Texas
