= Three-level diamond interchange =

Type of highway interchange

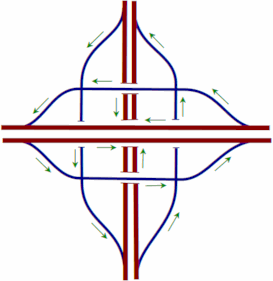
Three-level diamond diagram. Arrows are for traffic driving on the right.

A three-level diamond interchange is a type of highway interchange where through traffic on both main roads is grade-separated from intersections which handle transferring traffic. It is similar in design to a three-level stacked roundabout except for its use of (usually signalled) conventional intersections, and can be thought of as two diamond interchanges fused together.

Road enthusiasts sometimes use the terms volleyball interchange or split-level diamond interchange to refer to these interchanges.

== Description ==
In a three-level diamond interchange, the two main roads are on separate levels, and on a third level, usually in the middle, there is a square of one-way roads. The square circulates clockwise where traffic drives on the left, or anticlockwise where it drives on the right. At each corner of the square is the terminal of an exit ramp from one main road and an entrance ramp to the other main road.

Traffic transferring from one road to the other to make an overall right turn only passes through one corner of the square, at which point a right turn is made. Transfer traffic making an overall left turn must proceed straight through the first intersection it encounters, turn left at the next, and then proceed straight through a third intersection to enter the other main roadway.

Its two-level variant is the split diamond interchange.

Its at-grade variant is the town center intersection (TCI).

== Examples ==
Location	First Route	Second Route	Notes
Phoenix, Arizona, United States	Indian School Road	I-17 (Black Canyon Freeway)	Proposed three-level diamond interchange, will include I-17's frontage roads and Texas U-turns for Indian School Road traffic.
Tucson, Arizona, United States	Kolb Road	I-10 (Tucson-Benson Highway)	Proposed combination of a three-level and Diverging diamond interchange, entrances and exits will utilize the diverging diamond element.
Doral, Florida, United States	MIA Cargo Viaduct	SR 826 (Palmetto Expressway)	Northwest 25th Street serves as a frontage road for the MIA Cargo Viaduct. A flyover ramp was added to allow westbound MIA Cargo Viaduct traffic to join SR 826 north.
Cedar Rapids, Iowa, United States	I-380	Iowa 100	Collector/distributor roads intersect.
Detroit, Michigan, United States	I-75 (Walter P. Chrysler Freeway)	M-102 (8 Mile Road)	I-75 uses frontage roads
Detroit, Michigan, United States	M-1 (Woodward Avenue)	M-102 (8 Mile Road)	
Detroit, Michigan, United States	M-10 (John C. Lodge Freeway)	M-102 (8 Mile Road)	Includes slip ramps from northbound M-10 to westbound M-102, eastbound M-102 to southbound M-10, and westbound M-102 to northbound M-10. M-10 uses frontage roads
Redford Township, Wayne County, Michigan, United States	I-96 (Jeffries Freeway)	US 24 (Telegraph Road)	I-96 uses frontage roads
Jefferson City, Missouri, United States	US 50 / US 63 northbound	US 54 / US 63 southbound	A flyover ramp has been added to allow westbound US 54 traffic to join US 50 east, bypassing one intersection. This addition necessitates the use of a nearby city street to transfer from westbound US 50 to westbound US 54.
Asheville, North Carolina, United States	I-240	US 70	I-240 exit 7
High Point, North Carolina, United States	I-74	US 29	I-74 exit 71B
Oklahoma City, Oklahoma, United States	SH-74	I-344 Toll / Kilpatrick Turnpike	Includes frontage roads at-grade with interchange (signed as Portland Avenue and West Memorial Road, respectively, for the first and second routes). Two flyover ramps, one from westbound Kilpatrick Turnpike (I-344) to southbound OK-74 and the other from northbound OK-74 to eastbound Kilpatrick Turnpike, are included with the interchange.
Marple Township, Delaware County, Pennsylvania, United States	I-476	US 1	I-476 exit 5
Robinson Township, Washington County, Pennsylvania, United States	PA Turnpike 576	US 22	PA 576 exit 6
Austin, Texas, United States	US 183	Loop 275	Includes frontage roads at-grade with interchange
Big Spring, Texas, United States	US 87	I-20	Includes frontage roads at-grade with interchange
Conroe, Texas, United States	SH 242	I-45	Proposed three-level diamond interchange. Currently, at-grade frontage roads and two flyover ramps, one from northbound I-45 to westbound SH 242 (College Park Drive) and the other from westbound SH 242 (Needham Road) to southbound I-45, are included with the interchange. A third flyover from northbound I-45 to eastbound SH 242 is in the planning stages.
Dallas, Texas, United States	Loop 12 (Buckner Boulevard)	I-30 / US 67	Includes frontage roads at-grade with interchange
Del Valle, Texas, United States	71 Toll Lanes	SH 130 Toll (Pickle Parkway)	Includes frontage roads at-grade with interchange. A flyover ramp was added to allow eastbound SH 71 traffic to join SH 130 north.
El Paso, Texas, United States	US 54 (Patriot Freeway)	Loop 375 (Woodrow Bean Transmountain Drive)	Includes frontage roads at-grade with interchange
Frisco, Texas, United States	Sam Rayburn Tollway	SH 289 (Preston Road)	Includes frontage roads at-grade with interchange (signed as SH 121 for the first route)
Frisco, Texas, United States	Dallas North Tollway	US 380 (University Drive)	Includes frontage roads at-grade with interchange (signed as Dallas Parkway for the first route)
Frisco, Texas, United States	US 380 (University Drive)	SH 289 (Preston Road)	Includes frontage roads at-grade with interchange.
Houston, Texas, United States	SH 6 / FM 1960	US 290 (Northwest Freeway)	Includes frontage roads at-grade with interchange. A flyover ramp was added to allow northbound SH 6 traffic to join U.S. 290 east.
Houston, Texas, United States	SH 6	I-10 (Katy Freeway)	Includes frontage roads at-grade with interchange.
Houston, Texas, United States	Beltway 8 (Sam Houston Parkway)	Hardy Toll Road	Includes frontage roads at-grade with interchange. A flyover ramp was added to allow eastbound Beltway 8 traffic to join Hardy Toll Road north.
Houston, Texas, United States	FM 1960 (Cypress Creek Parkway)	Hardy Toll Road	Includes frontage roads at-grade with interchange.
Houston, Texas, United States	Fort Bend Tollway	Sam Houston Tollway	Includes frontage roads at-grade with interchange (signed as Hillcroft Avenue and Beltway 8, respectively, for the first and second routes).
Houston, Texas, United States	Fort Bend Parkway Toll Road	SH 6	Includes frontage roads at-grade with interchange.
Houston, Texas, United States	Grand Parkway Toll Road	Fort Bend Westpark Tollway	Includes frontage roads at-grade with interchange (signed as SH 99 and F.M. 1093, respectively, for the first and second routes). A flyover ramp was added to allow southbound Grand Parkway traffic to join Westpark Tollway east.
Houston, Texas, United States	I-45 (North Freeway)	FM 1960	Includes frontage roads at-grade with interchanges.
Houston, Texas, United States	I-45 (North Freeway)	Greens Road	Includes frontage roads at-grade with interchanges.
Houston, Texas, United States	Memorial Drive	Houston Avenue	Includes frontage roads at-grade with interchanges.
Houston, Texas, United States	Sam Houston Tollway	US 90 (Crosby Freeway)	Includes frontage roads at-grade with interchanges (signed as Beltway 8 for Sam Houston Tollway).
Houston, Texas, United States	Sam Houston Tollway	US 90 Alt.	Includes frontage roads at-grade with interchanges (signed as Beltway 8 for Sam Houston Tollway).
Houston, Texas, United States	SH 249 (Tomball Parkway)	FM 1960	Includes frontage roads at-grade with interchange.
Lubbock, Texas, United States	US 62 / US 82	Loop 289	Includes frontage roads at-grade with interchanges.
Lubbock, Texas, United States	US 84	I-27 / US 87	Includes frontage roads at-grade with interchanges.
Lubbock, Texas, United States	Loop 289	I-27 / US 87	Includes frontage roads at-grade with interchanges.
Lubbock, Texas, United States	Loop 289	US 82 / SH 114	Includes frontage roads at-grade with interchanges.
Mont Belvieu, Texas, United States	SH 99 Toll (Grand Parkway)	I-10	Includes frontage roads at-grade with interchange.
New Caney, Texas, United States	SH 99 Toll (Grand Parkway)	I-69 / US 59	Includes frontage roads at-grade with interchange. Two flyover ramps, one from eastbound SH 99 to northbound I-69/US 59 and the other from northbound I-69/US 59 to westbound SH 99, are included with the interchange.
Pasadena, Texas, United States	Sam Houston Tollway	SH 225 (Pasadena Freeway)	Includes frontage roads at-grade with interchange (signed as Beltway 8 for the first route).
Richardson, Texas, United States	US 75 (Central Expressway)	Spring Valley Road	Includes frontage roads at-grade with interchanges.
Round Rock, Texas, United States	US 79	SH 130 Toll (Pickle Parkway)	Includes frontage roads at-grade with interchanges.
Sherman, Texas, United States	US 75	US 82	Includes frontage roads at-grade with interchanges.
Spring, Texas, United States	SH 99 Toll (Grand Parkway)	I-45 (North Freeway)	Includes frontage roads at-grade with interchange. Two flyover ramps, one from eastbound SH 99 to northbound I-45 and the other from southbound I-45 to westbound SH 99, are included with the interchange.
Sugar Land, Texas, United States	I-69 / US 59	US 90 Alt.	Includes frontage roads at-grade with interchange
Tomball, Texas, United States	SH 99 Toll (Grand Parkway)	Tomball Tollway	Includes frontage roads at-grade with interchange (signed as SH 249 for the second route). The southern half of the interchange has four flyover ramps: two from northbound Tomball Tollway to east and westbound SH 99 and the other two from SH 99 (west and eastbound) to Tomball Tollway southbound
Tyler, Texas, United States	Loop 49 Toll	I-20	Includes frontage roads at-grade with interchanges.
Waco, Texas, United States	SH 6 / Loop 340	US 84	Includes frontage roads at-grade with interchanges.
Waco, Texas, United States	I-35 (Jack Kultgen Freeway)	Bus. US 77 (New Dallas Highway)	Includes frontage roads at-grade with interchanges.
Waco, Texas, United States	US 84 (Waco Drive)	Bus. US 77	Includes frontage roads at-grade with interchanges.
Alexandria, Virginia, United States	I-395 (Shirley Highway)	Seminary Road	I-395 exit 4
Fairfax County, Virginia, United States	SR 286 (Fairfax County Parkway)	US 29	The south end of West Ox Road also meets this interchange.
Welch, West Virginia, United States	US 52 (King Coal Highway)	US 121 (Coalfields Expressway)	As of 2011, grading has been completed for interchange but interchange itself has not been constructed.
Wheeling, West Virginia, United States	I-470	US 250 / WV 2	Entire interchange is elevated above city streets.
Wauwatosa, Wisconsin, United States	I-41 / US 45	WIS 190 (Capitol Drive)	An access road for the adjacent Harley-Davidson plant is also part of the interchange.
Belmont, Queensland, Australia	Gateway Motorway (M1)	Old Cleveland Road (State Route 22)	Two of the ramps are two-way for a short distance to allow access from the interchange to and from local streets.
Düsseldorf-Stockum, Germany	Autobahn 44	Bundesstraße 8	At 51°16′16.9″N 6°45′1.8″E; rare design in Germany
Minsk, Belarus	Praspiekt Dziaržynskaha	Praspiekt Žukava	At 53°52′59.7″N 27°30′19.2″E
Mexicali, Baja California, Mexico	Fed. 5 (Boulevard Adolfo López Mateos)	Fed. 2 (Boulevard Lázaro Cárdenas)	At 32°37′28″N 115°27′9″W
Petaling Jaya, Malaysia	FT 2 Federal Highway	Damansara–Puchong Expressway	Diverging Diamond

Many examples of this interchange type can also be found in Texas; however, the interchanges almost always include the frontage roads as well. If the traffic amounts increase, the interchange is usually converted into a stack interchange, also as the second level of the High Five Interchange.
