= Westheimer Road =

Road in Houston, Texas, United States

- Location: Harris and Fort Bend counties
- From: Bagby Street
- Major junctions: I-610 Beltway 8 SH 6
- To: Westpark Tollway

Westheimer Road (/ˈwɛst(h)aɪmər/) is an arterial east–west road in Houston, Texas, United States. It runs from Bagby Street in Downtown and terminates at the Westpark Tollway on the southern edge of George Bush Park, stretching about 19 miles (31 km) long. The street was named after Michael Louis Westheimer, a German immigrant and flour salesman.

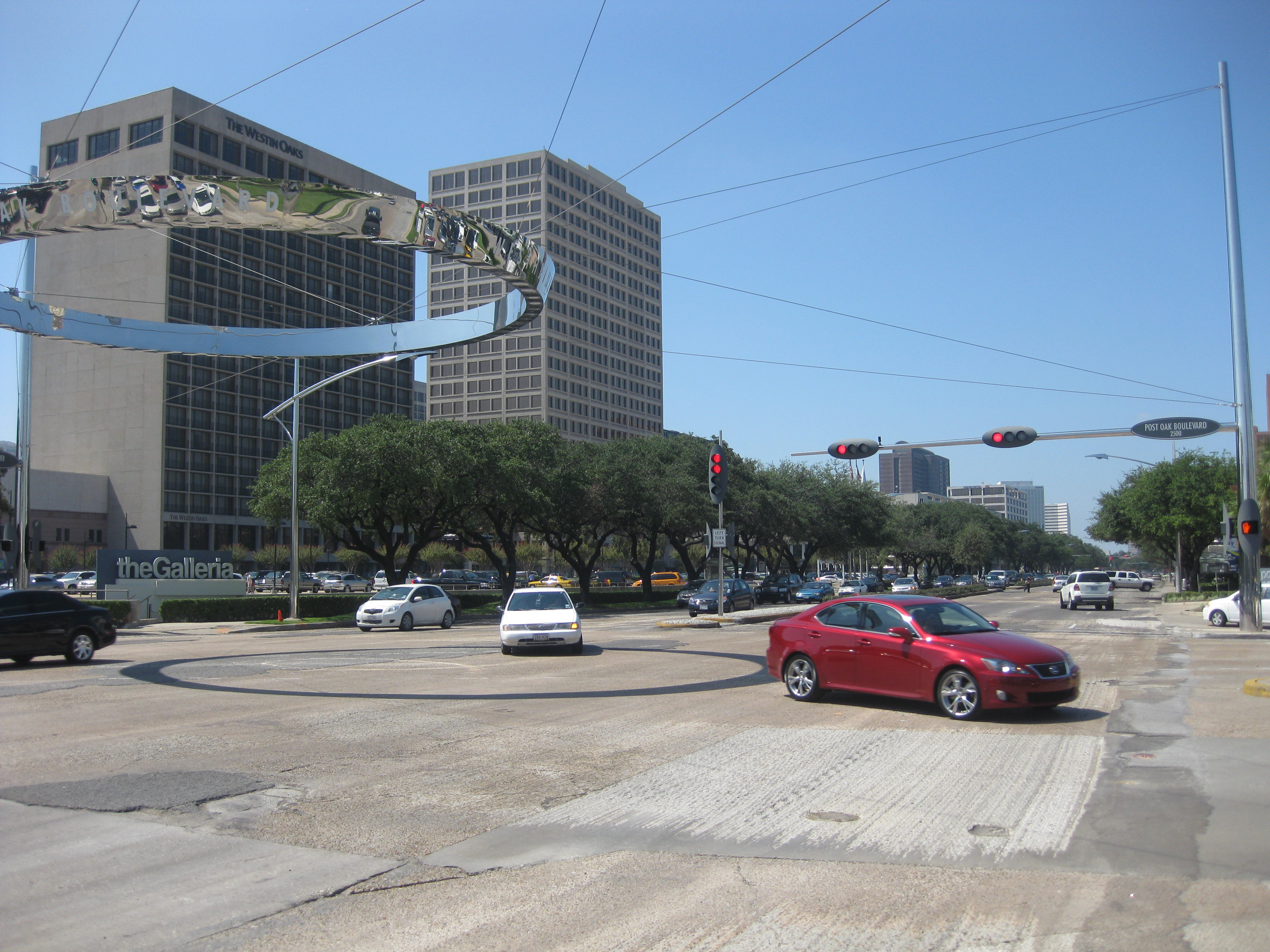
Westheimer Road at Post Oak in Uptown

== Route description ==
Westheimer Road's eastern terminus is at Bagby Street. At this point, traffic heading east on Westheimer either turns southwest on Bagby Street or jogs right and southeasterly, continuing on Elgin Street into Midtown and into Third Ward near the University of Houston. From Bagby west, Westheimer jogs mostly westerly, through Neartown, forms the south boundary of the River Oaks community and then passes under Interstate 610 (I-610) west.

The portion spanning from I-610 west to the Westpark Tollway is designated as a part of Farm to Market Road 1093 (FM 1093). From I-610 west, Westheimer Road traverses through Uptown and then west-southwest to Chimney Rock. From Chimney Rock west, Westheimer is straight along a cardinal east–west line. Westheimer passes north of Alief and Westchase when passing under Beltway 8. After intersecting State Highway 6 (SH 6) and passing west of West Oaks Mall, Westheimer Road and Westheimer Parkway split, with Westheimer Parkway continuing west through George Bush Park and Westheimer Road (also known as "Old Westheimer Road") turning southwest. Westheimer Road terminates when FM 1093 becomes the feeder road of the Westpark Tollway just west of FM 1464 and just inside Fort Bend County.

== Character of Various Segments ==
John Nova Lomax of the Houston Press said in a 2006 article that Westheimer Road, "more than any other thoroughfare, embodies Houston's car-enamored, zoning-free ethos, a damn-near 20-mile [32 km] phantasmagoria of strip malls, storage facilities, restaurants, big-box retail, office parks, apartment complexes, strip clubs, malls, supermarkets and the occasional church." In another article, he referred to Westheimer as "mainly about the fetishes, broken dreams and vanities of Anglo whites."

In a post on the Houston Press website during the same year, he called the stretch of Westheimer west of Chimney Rock Road and east of Fondren Road, which he refers to as "Mid-Westheimer", "The Testosterone Zone". Referring to a photograph of a shopping center on that segment, Lomax added that "This strip center is the essence of that—Evans Music City, an army surplus store, a titty bar and a liquor store within 100 yards [91 m] of each other. Now that's one-stop shopping." In Houston Architectural Guide, Stephen Fox said the following about the stretch of Westheimer between Chimney Rock Road and South Gessner Road:

Nowhere is the 'anything goes' image that adheres to Houston more blatantly displayed than along the stretch of Westheimer Road between Chimney Rock and South Gessner Road. Middle-class subdivisions of the 1950s flank this strip, but they are hidden behind broad bands of commercial development that face Westheimer. Most of these date from the 1960s and early '70s, when Houston's suburbanizing ethos was at its least constrained. Not only do shopping centers, gas stations and fast-food restaurants line up along Westheimer—each flashing signs or theme-style inducements to passersby—but mega-garden apartment complexes compete for attention in a mixture of dimly recognizable 'traditional' styles. The order of the strip is economic, rather than visual or experiential. The biggest-grossing land gets the prime footage."

Lomax said that the segment of Westheimer in Westchase is "virtually all chains—a Geography of Nowhere wasteland of Boston Market, Borders, Kroger, Randalls, Taco Bell, Citgo and Sonic. Several of the six CVS outlets we passed are there, as are a few of the uncountable Starbucks." He added that the segment of Westheimer Road in Westchase does not have "the sleaze of the Highway 6 area and the tacky exuberance of mid-Westheimer, the area between Chimney Rock and Fondren."

In 2007, Colliers International ranked Westheimer Road as the seventh most expensive retail street in the US by rent per square foot; the group calculated the rent per square foot as $120 ($46/km^{2}).

In 2007, Mimi Swartz of Texas Monthly referred to a stretch of Westheimer between Claremont Lane and Kirby Drive as "the socialite's sector" due to the stores catering to residents of River Oaks and other nearby wealthy communities; in the article, she describes several places along the stretch of Westheimer.

Between Willowick Road and Sage Road, Westheimer is lined with prestigious boutiques and high-end stores that feature luxury goods. Among the shopping centers in this section include The Galleria and River Oaks District and many others. Brands that feature boutiques include Apple, Tom Ford, Gucci, Fendi, Dior, Dolce & Gabbana, John Hardy, Cartier, Carolina Herrera, Prada, Rolex, Versace, among others.

=== Lower Westheimer ===
Between Shepherd Drive and Bagby Street, the street is known as Lower Westheimer. The area is famous for its hipster culture, food scene, and nightlife. Thrift stores, tattoo shops, and bars dominate the area. Westheimer is the Main Street of the Montrose neighborhood which was dubbed as one of the greatest neighborhoods of the United States. The arts culture is widespread, with graffiti present in and on buildings throughout.

== Westheimer Parkway ==
From its eastern terminus at Westheimer Road/FM 1093, Westheimer Parkway winds through George Bush Park and the Cinco Ranch neighborhood in Harris County and Fort Bend County. The Parkway then runs under Grand Parkway near Cinco Ranch High School. Westheimer Parkway's western terminus is in Fort Bend County approximately 3.5 miles (5.6 km) northwest of Grand Parkway. At this point, traffic heading northwest on Westheimer Parkway continues on Pin Oak Road near Katy Mills, located in Katy.

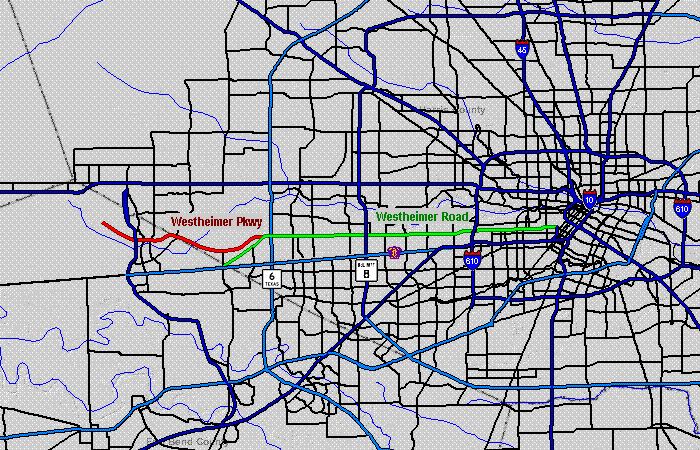
Westheimer Road and Westheimer Parkway

== History ==
Westheimer Road and Westheimer Parkway are named after Mitchell (Michael) Louis Westheimer, a prosperous German Jewish immigrant and flour salesman who had settled in Houston in 1859. He purchased a 640-acre (260 ha) farm west of Houston's city limits at the time, where Lamar High School and St. John's School are currently located. Having built a school on his land for his 16 children, other local children were invited to join the school, as a public school system was not established in the area. The road that led to his property was known as "the road to Westheimer's place" and wound through what would later be Neartown and River Oaks.

In 1895, Westheimer allowed Harris County to build a right-of-way for a road stretching from Houston to Columbus and Sealy; this road became Westheimer Road.
