= Toll roads in Texas =

Overview of toll roads in the U.S. state of Texas

Toll roads
- Various toll road markers in use in Texas

System information
- Formed: 1957

Highway names
- Interstates: Interstate X (I-X); Interstate Highway X (IH-X)
- US Highways: U.S. Highway X (US X)
- State: State Highway X (SH X)
- Loops: Loop X
- Spurs: Spur X
- Recreational: Recreational Road X (RE X)
- Farm or Ranch to Market Roads: Farm to Market Road X (FM X); Ranch to Market Road X (RM X)
- Park Roads: Park Road X (PR X)

System links
- Highways in Texas; Interstate; US; State; Former; Toll; Loops; Spurs; FM/RM; Park; Rec

There are approximately 25 current toll roads in the state of Texas. Toll roads are more common in Texas than in many other U.S. states, since the relatively low revenues from the state's gasoline tax limits highway planners' means to fund the construction and operation of highways.

== Background ==
Toll roads, sometimes are seen as a recent addition to travel options for commuters. However, this is not the case. In fact the need for, use of, and discussion of toll roads can be traced back to 1939. According to Richard Weingroff at the Federal Highway Administration:

In the 1939 report to Congress, Toll Roads and Free Roads, the U.S. Bureau of Public Roads (BPR) rejected the toll option for financing Interstate construction because most Interstate corridors would not generate enough toll revenue to retire the bonds that would be issued to finance them. In part, the report attributed this conclusion to "the traffic-repelling tendency of the proposed toll-road system." Although some corridors had enough traffic to support bond financing, the report predicted that motorists would stay on the parallel toll-free roads to a large extent. That conclusion was called into question when the first segment of the Pennsylvania Turnpike, from Carlisle to Irwin, opened on October 1, 1940. It was an instant financial success. Following World War II, the turnpike's continued success prompted other States to use the same financing method. Each State established a toll authority to issue bonds. Revenue from the bonds provided the funds, up front, to pay for construction. Toll revenue allowed the toll authority to repay bond holders with interest and finance administration, maintenance, and operation of the highway.

The use of this toll system is related to the state of Texas as one might infer. The state of Texas, especially Central Texas, has seen a significant growth in recent years. The United States Census Bureau reports that in 2010 Texas had a population just over 25 million citizens. It is estimated that the population grew over five percent in just three years to nearly 26.5 million people. This growth has exposed concern related to its infrastructure; specifically the lack of thoroughfares that can effectively move the increased vehicle traffic. An answer that has been provided to address this concern is the implementation of toll roads. Toll road construction is more prevalent now than in the past.

The toll roads in Central Texas are governed through the Central Texas Regional Mobility Authority (CTRMA), which is stated to be the creating agency for transportation models to keep up with today's population growth. to promote future road construction which is to alleviate traffic issues within Travis and Williamson Counties Texas is one of few states that has allowed private toll roads.

The idea that toll roads should be privatized, is an idea that stemmed from European models that are evident in Spain, Italy, and England. The European model is called build-operate-transfer (BOT), which is simply a public–private ownership of a roadway (toll road). The idea of a BOT is that a private company will fund, design and construct the planned toll roads and will operate them at the beginning of a project until their contract is fulfilled with a government, in which at the end of the contract the toll road will go under the ownership of...[such] government. Despite the fact for which the CTRMA stands for or wishes to promote, there are many opposers to the expansion of toll roads within Central Texas.

=== Opinions ===
A reason in favor of toll roads mentioned in The Texas Tribune was tolls are "vital" to the state's future mobility planning as Texas tries to close the gap on road funding shortfall. The article explains how the gas tax has not been increased since 1993 and costs of building roadways has increased throughout time supporting the construction of toll roads.

A reason against one of the Central Texas toll projects is that the company that runs the SH130 toll road has been said by Moody's business rating to have the possibility of defaulting on its debt in 2014. Therefore, Moody's lowered the business rating to B1. A B1 classification "indicates that the business is pretty risky to lend money to". The sponsors of the toll road were Zachary, which sponsored 65%, and Cintra that sponsored 35%. The lenders to the project: TIFIA program under the Federal Highway Administration which contributed $475 million, and several other banks that funded $686 million.

Despite the fact that the partner companies are defaulting on debt, the chairman for the SH130 Concession Company reiterated that in time the project would, "prove a wise investment as drivers look for an alternative to Interstate 35." Even though traffic volume has been low on SH130 Krier (Chairman for the SH130 Concession Company) went on to state that the company "is pretty confident in the long term" and that "it is going to be a huge transportation asset for the region."

TxDOT is in favor of the toll roads, claiming that it simply does not have the funds to provide the anticipated service requirements of the Texas populace. Phil Russell, director of TxDOT's Texas Turnpike Authority Division, said in a statement, “We simply can’t continue to rely on the gas tax as our sole source of highway funding. In fact, projections are that the state gas tax would need to be raised 600 percent to meet our transportation needs over the next 25 years. Texans tell us that they want relief from traffic congestion now, not later. Toll roads allow us to build roads sooner.”

In Texas the backlash against Toll Roads has culminated in several organizations including the Texas Toll Lawsuit website where approximately 10,000 Texans are building a class action lawsuit against the state. Another organization performing similar activities is Texans United for Reform & Freedom. The purpose of these organizations is to combat what they claim are egregious tolling fines and illegal/immoral practices by the toll road authorities.

=== Moratorium ===
Due to the enduring controversy over the future of Texas toll roads, the state legislature overwhelmingly passed a moratorium on all new toll roads in Texas in 2007. The moratorium effectively banned all new proposals for toll roads for two years, until 2009. However, this moratorium was deemed the "Swiss cheese moratorium," as it had a multitude of exemptions placed in it. Specifically, the exemptions allowed almost all the projects in the North Texas/Dallas regions to go forward. The primary concern leading to the moratorium was that the state was hurting taxpayers in the long run by deviating from its tollway authority model and contracting out roads entirely to private companies. Many legislators saw this as problematic, as the primary function of these toll roads would not be to serve the public but to serve as an instrument of profit for private corporations. These companies could raise tolls to whatever the market could bear with little or virtually no public input, and the tolls would continue long after the construction costs were paid for.

== Operating agencies ==
=== Texas Department of Transportation ===
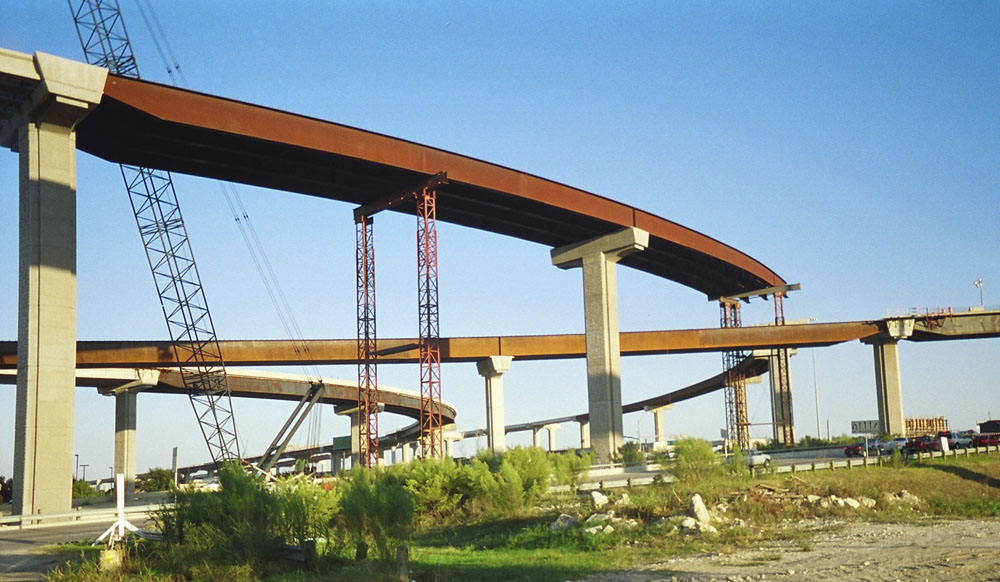
Interchange between Interstate 35 and State Highway 45

The Toll Operations Division of the Texas Department of Transportation (TxDOT) builds and operates toll roads throughout the state. Until 2024, the division also operated the TxTag electronic toll collection system, which has since been merged into the HCTRA-operated EZ TAG system.

TxDOT operates three toll roads in Greater Austin (collectively named the Central Texas Turnpike System, or CTTS), six managed-access lanes in the Dallas–Fort Worth Metroplex (branded as TEXpress Lanes), and two toll roads in Greater Houston.

==== Public-private partnerships ====
TxDOT allows for the creation of toll roads and managed-access lanes through public–private partnerships, officially called Comprehensive Development Agreements (CDAs). Under a CDA, the design, construction, and maintenance of the road is paid for by a private operator (typically a consortium of investors) in exchange for the right to collect tolls for an extended period of time. TxDOT retains ownership of the road itself and receives a share of the generated revenue.

At present, five projects in the state are operated through CDAs:

- Interstate 635 Express (LBJ Infrastructure Group)
- Interstate 35W Express (NTE Mobility Partners Segments 3, LLC)
- North Tarrant Express (NTE Mobility Partners)
- Texas State Highway 130 sections 5 and 6 (SH 130 Concession Company, LLC)
- Texas State Highway 288 Express Harris County section (Blueridge Transportation Group)

=== Regional tollway authorities ===
Regional tollway authorities are state-level political bodies established through multi-county agreements. They may build and operate toll roads within their member counties and adjacent non-member counties, as well as issue bonds backed by toll revenue to fund future projects. They are governed by a board of directors appointed by member counties and the Governor of Texas.

The North Texas Tollway Authority (NTTA) is the only regional tollway authority in the state. Established by Collin, Dallas, Denton and Tarrant counties, NTTA owns and operates all toll roads, toll bridges, and toll tunnels in the Dallas–Fort Worth metroplex. The authority also collects tolls on tolled express lanes in the region on behalf of TxDOT; however, it does not manage the lanes or set prices.

=== County toll road authorities ===
County toll road authorities (TRAs) are established by single counties. A county toll road authority is a division of the county in which it is established.

Authority	Creation date	Notes
Brazoria County Toll Road Authority (BCTRA)	2003	Operates the Brazoria County Expressway in the median of SH 288 within Brazoria County; the toll lanes opened on November 16, 2020, and were free to use until November 30.
Chambers County Toll Road Authority (ChCTRA)	20??	Does not yet operate any toll roads
Collin County Toll Road Authority (CoCTRA)	2010	Does not yet operate any toll roads. Created to build and operate the Collin County Outer Loop.
Fort Bend County Toll Road Authority (FBCTRA)	1996	Operates the Fort Bend Parkway Toll Road and the Fort Bend Westpark Tollway in Fort Bend County.
Fort Bend Grand Parkway Toll Road Authority (FBGPTRA)	2009	Branch of the FBCTRA; created to take over a major two-thirds portion of Segment D of SH 99 (Grand Parkway), located in Fort Bend County, from TxDOT; TxDOT retains operation of the remaining, minor, portion of Segment D located in Fort Bend County.
Harris County Toll Road Authority (HCTRA)	1983	Operates the Hardy Toll Road (including the connector to George Bush Intercontinental Airport), Sam Houston Tollway, Westpark Tollway, Fort Bend Toll Road (north of Beltway 8), Katy Managed Lanes in the median of I-10 and the Tomball Tollway within Harris County. HCTRA also operates the EZ TAG toll collection system, including former TxTag operations.
Liberty County Toll Road Authority (LCTRA)	2007	Does not yet operate any toll roads
Montgomery County Toll Road Authority (MCTRA)	2005	Operates the MCTRA 249 Tollway between Harris County line at Spring Creek to F.M. 1774 in Montgomery County. The agency had formerly operated two toll ramps (one from I-45 North to SH 242 West and the other from SH 242 West to I-45 South), with HCTRA collecting the tolls for MCTRA. Tolls were removed on May 28, 2019.
Waller County Transportation Authority (WCTA) Formerly Waller County Toll Road Authority (WCTRA)	2010; 2008	Does not yet operate any toll roads

=== Regional mobility authorities ===
In 2001, the State Legislature authorized the creation of the regional mobility authorities (RMAs). These authorities are designed as a means for individual or multiple counties to build, operate, and maintain local toll roads or other transportation projects. These authorities are authorized to issue bonds as well as designate local revenue sources to pay for the initial costs of the projects. The primary purpose for creating the RMAs was to reduce the time and bureaucratic "red tape" in the toll road building process.

Name	Creation date	Counties of operation
Alamo Regional Mobility Authority (ARMA)	2003	Bexar
Cameron County Regional Mobility Authority (CCRMA)	2004	Cameron
Camino Real Regional Mobility Authority (CRRMA)	2006	El Paso
Central Texas Regional Mobility Authority (CTRMA)	2003	Travis and Williamson
Grayson County Regional Mobility Authority (GCRMA)	2004	Grayson
Hidalgo County Regional Mobility Authority (HCRMA)	2005	Hidalgo
North East Texas Regional Mobility Authority (NETRMA)	2004	Bowie, Cass, Cherokee, Gregg, Harrison, Panola, Rusk, Smith, Titus, Upshur, Van Zandt and Wood
Sulphur River Regional Mobility Authority (SURRMA)	2012	Delta, Hunt and Lamar
Webb County–City of Laredo Regional Mobility Authority (WCCL-RMA)	2014	Webb

=== Dallas/Fort Worth International Airport ===
International Parkway (Spur 97) is a road through Dallas/Fort Worth International Airport that provides access to the airport's five terminals and on-site parking. While not officially designated as a toll road, it is generally considered one since it charges a fee for access-control purposes.

The road uses a ticket system that charges travelers based on the time between entrance and exit, allowing the toll plazas to serve as payment for on-site parking. The airport also charges a fee for pass-through travel to reduce congestion.

International Parkway is the only toll road in the state that does not accept TxTag or EZ TAG transponders. However, it does accept TollTag transponders.

== Motor assistance programs ==
The Central Texas Regional Mobility Authority has provided a program to assist disabled drivers. The HERO Program, is a combined effort of "the Central Texas Regional Mobility Authority, in partnership with the Texas Department of Transportation, operates the Highway Emergency Response Operator (HERO) Program—a free roadside assistance program that provides aid to stranded motorists, minimizes traffic congestion and improves highway safety along Interstate 35 in Central Texas... The program is being paid for through a combination of federal and state funds, and it costs roughly $2.3 million a year to provide the service." The Houston area has a similar Motor Assistance Program (M.A.P.) operated by a partnership with Houston's METRO, Texas Department of Transportation, Harris County Sheriff's Department, Houston Automobile Dealers Association, Verizon Wireless and Houston TranStar

== Operational costs ==
The cost of operating and maintaining the roadways used by commuters is quite costly. Not all costs are considered when the need for a road is required in a geographic area. Financing tolls collected help the end be reached. The Central Texas Regional Mobility Authority is charged with the management and construction of toll ways in central Texas. According to the CTRMA's Financial/Investor Information information page, "The Mobility Authority uses innovative financial strategies to expedite the funding of needed transportation projects. Our nationally recognized, award-winning approach is using a mix of toll revenue bonds, government loans, toll equity grants, right-of-way donations and other funding sources to develop a transportation network that will help address the region's growing congestion problems." Detailed earnings and investment statements are available for each road under the CTRMA's authority. Use of funds generated by the commuters in central Texas are explained here, as well. One use/benefit of the toll system is the HERO Program.

== List ==
=== Toll roads ===
Number	Length (mi)	Length (km)	Southern or western terminus	Northern or eastern terminus	Formed	Removed	Notes
Loop 1 Toll	3	4.8	Parmer Lane in Austin	SH 45 in Austin	2006	current	Operated by TxDOT; (Note: operated as part of the Central Texas Turnpike System (CTTS)) continues south of Parmer Lane without tolls
SH 45 Toll	50	80	N/SE: I-35 in Austin; SW: Loop 1 in Austin	N/SE: FM 620 in Austin; SW: FM 1626 in Austin	2006	current	North/Southeast: Operated by TxDOT; concurrent with SH 130 from US 183 to FM 685; Southwest: Operated by CTRMA; continues west of Loop 1 without tolls
Loop 49 Toll	32	51	US 69 in Lindale	SH 110 in Tyler	2006	current	Operated by NETRMA; (Note: tolled by NTTA) multi-segment expansion to US 59 proposed
SH 99 Toll	123	198	I-69 / US 59 in Sugar Land	SH 146 in Baytown	1994	current	Operated by FBGPTRA from I-69/US 59 to Fort Bend Westpark Tollway/FM 1093; operated by TxDOT from Fort Bend Westpark Tollway/FM 1093 to SH 146
SH 130 Toll	87.6	141.0	I-10 in Seguin	I-35 / SH 195 in Georgetown	2006	current	Operated by the State Highway 130 Concession Company (Note: operated under a CDA with TxDOT) from I-10 to SH 45; operated by TxDOT from SH 45 to I-35/SH 195
183 Toll Road	6.7	10.8	SH 71 in Austin	Loyola Lane in Austin	2019	current	Operated by CTRMA; continues both ways without tolls
183A Toll Road	10.7	17.2	US 183 / SH 45 / RM 620 in Cedar Park	US 183 in Leander	2007	current	Operated by CTRMA
SH 242 Toll	0.1	0.16	I-45 in The Woodlands	SH 242 in The Woodlands (westbound only)	2015	2019	Tolled ramps connecting I-45 and SH 242 westbound; formerly operated by MCTRA; (Note: tolled by HCTRA) now free and operated by TxDOT
SH 249 Toll	16.7	26.9	Tomball Tollway at Harris/Montgomery county line	FM 1774 in Todd Mission	2019	current	Operated by MCTRA from Tomball Tollway to Woodtrace Boulevard; operated by TxDOT from Woodtrace Boulevard to FM 1774
SH 255 Toll	22.5	36.2	Laredo–Colombia Solidarity International Bridge at Mexico–United States border	I-35 in Laredo	2000	2017	Operated by TxDOT; now a freeway
290 Toll Road	6.2	10.0	US 183 in Austin	FM 734 in Manor	2013	current	Operated by CTRMA; continues both ways without tolls
SH 360 Toll	9.7	15.6	US 287 in Mansfield	Camp Wisdom Road / Sublett Road in Grand Prairie	2018	current	Operated by NTTA
SH 365 Toll	17.4	28.0	FM 1016 in Mission	US 281 in Pharr	proposed	—	Under construction; will be operated by HCRMA; 7.73 mi (12.44 km) western extension to I-2 in Peñitas also proposed
SH 375 Toll	6.4	10.3	I-10 / US 85 / US 180 in El Paso	Oregon Street in Downtown El Paso	2019	2023	Built by TxDOT as a toll road, (Note: tolled by CRRMA) but tolls were never collected; set to become a freeway
SH 550 Toll	3	4.8	I-69E / US 77 / US 83 in Brownsville	Port of Brownsville	2009	current	Operated by CCRMA; co-signed as I-169
Addison Airport Toll Tunnel	0.7	1.1	Midway Road in Addison	Addison Road in Addison	1999	current	Operated by NTTA
Chisholm Trail Parkway	27.6	44.4	Route 67 in Cleburne	I-30 / US 377 in Fort Worth	2014	current	Operated by NTTA
D/FW Turnpike	30	48	US 81 / I-35W in Fort Worth	US 77 / I-35E in Dallas	1957	1977	Formerly operated by the Texas Turnpike Authority; now part of I-30 and operated by TxDOT as a freeway
Dallas North Tollway	33	53	I-35E in Dallas	US 380 in Frisco	1968	current	Operated by NTTA; extension to FM 121 proposed
Fort Bend Tollway	10.1	16.3	Sienna Parkway in Missouri City	US 90 Alt in Houston	1988	current	Operated by FBCTRA from Sienna Parkway to Fort Bend/Harris county line; operated by HCTRA from county line to US 90 Alt
Hardy Toll Road	21.6	34.8	I-610 in Houston	I-45 in Spring	1988	current	Operated by HCTRA; has one spur connecting to George Bush Intercontinental Airport
International Parkway	7.5	12.1	SH 183 in Euless	SH 114 in Grapevine	1973	current	Operated by DFW Airport
Lewisville Lake Toll Bridge	1.7	2.7	East Swisher Road in Lake Dallas	West Eldorado Parkway in Lakewood Village	2009	current	Operated by NTTA; road continues on both sides without tolls
Mountain Creek Lake Bridge	2.5	4.0	Southeast 14th Street in Grand Prairie	Mountain Creek Parkway in Dallas	1979	current	Operated by NTTA; road continues on both sides as Spur 303 without tolls
Pres. George Bush Turnpike	52	84	I-20 in Grand Prairie	I-30 in Garland	1998	current	Operated by NTTA; co-signed as SH 161 and SH 190; 11 mi (18 km) extension to I-20 in Mesquite proposed
Sam Houston Tollway	88.1	141.8	Beltway around Houston		1982	current	Operated by HCTRA; four untolled segments signed as Beltway 8
Sam Rayburn Tollway	26	42	SH 121 in Lewisville	US 75 in McKinney	2006	current	Operated by NTTA; originally signed SH 121
Tomball Tollway	7.7	12.4	Northpointe Boulevard in Houston	SH 249 at Harris/Montgomery county line	2015	current	Operated by HCTRA; continues south without tolls
Westpark Tollway	20	32	FM 1093 in Katy	I-610 in Houston	2004	current	Operated by FBCTRA from FM 1093 to Fort Bend/Harris county line; operated by HCTRA from county line to I-610
Former; Proposed and unbuilt

=== Managed lanes ===
Number	Length (mi)	Length (km)	Southern or western terminus	Northern or eastern terminus	Formed	Removed	Notes
Loop 1 Express	10.8	17.4	Cesar Chavez Street in Austin	Parmer Lane in Austin	2017	current	Operated by CTRMA
I-10 Toll	12	19	SH 6 in Houston	I-610 (West Loop Freeway) in Houston	2009	current	Operated by HCTRA
Loop 12 Express	2.5	4.0	SH 183 Express in Irving	I-35E Express in Dallas	2018	current	Operated by TxDOT (Note: tolled by NTTA)
I-30 Express	12	19	President George Bush Turnpike in Grand Prairie	Sylvan Avenue in Dallas	2017	current	Operated by TxDOT; a 6.7 mi (10.8 km) extension to Center Street in Arlington is under construction
I-35E Express	19.6	31.5	Loop 12 Express in Dallas	FM 2181 in Lake Dallas	2017	current	Operated by LBJ Infrastructure Group (Note: operated under a CDA with TxDOT) from Loop 12 Express to I-635; operated by TxDOT from I-635 to FM 2181 (Note: both segments tolled by NTTA)
I-35W Express	10.1	16.3	I-30 in Fort Worth	US 287 in Fort Worth	2017	current	Operated by NTE Mobility Partners
71 Toll Lanes	3.9	6.3	Presidential Boulevard in Austin	SH 130 Toll in Austin	2017	current	Operated by CTRMA
SH 114 Express	14.5	23.3	SH 183 in Irving	SH 26 in Grapevine	2017	current	Operated by TxDOT
SH 121 Express	6.9	11.1	I-820 in Hurst	Murphy Drive in Bedford	2014	current	Operated by NTE Mobility Partners as part of NTE TEXpress; concurrent with SH 183 Express
SH 183 Express	20.6	33.2	I-820 in Hurst	Mockingbird Lane in Dallas	2014	current	Operated by NTE Mobility Partners as part of NTE TEXpress from I-820 to Industrial Boulevard; operated by TxDOT from Industrial Boulevard to Mockingbird Lane
SH 288 Toll	15.0	24.1	Brazoria County Road 58 in Manvel	I-69 / US 59 in Houston	2020	current	Operated by BCTRA from CR 58 to Brazoria/Harris county line; operated by Blueridge Transportation Group from county line to I-69/US 59 (Note: both segments tolled by HCTRA)
I-635 Express	8	13	I-35E in Dallas	US 75 in Dallas	2015	current	Operated by LBJ Infrastructure Group; another segment from US 75 to I-30 set to be operated by TxDOT is under construction
I-820 Express	6.4	10.3	I-35W Express in Fort Worth	SH 121 Express / SH 183 Express in Hurst	2014	current	Operated by NTE Mobility Partners as part of NTE TEXpress
