= Clodine, Texas =

- unincorporated community
- Location of Clodine, Texas
- Coordinates: 29°42′27″N 95°41′17″W
- Country: United States
- State: Texas
- County: Fort Bend
- Elevation: 95 ft (29 m)
- Time zone: UTC-6 (Central (CST))
  - Summer (DST): UTC-5 (CDT)
- ZIP code: 77407
- Area code: 281

Clodine (/ˈkloʊdiːn/ KLOH-deen) is an unincorporated community in Fort Bend County, Texas, United States. According to the Handbook of Texas, the community had a population of 31 in 1990. It is located in the Greater Houston metro area.

== History ==
Clodine was first established in the 1880s as a station on the San Antonio and Aransas Pass Railway. The town was named after a railroad official named Clodine KIng. Clodine had acquired a post office by 1893. In 1896 the town had a general store, a Baptist church, and 50 residents. By 1914, Clodine had telephone and telegraph connections and 25 residents. The population decreased to 10 in 1925, then grew to 70 four years later. The Texas and New Orleans Railroad bought the San Antonio and Aransas Pass line in 1934 and removed the depot and section houses. By 1936, the town had gained a factory and several businesses. In 1947, Clodine had a population of fifty and was a shipping point for surrounding farms and a local oil field. In 1990, Clodine had approximately 31 residents.

In 2001, George Bush High School opened. In early 2003, the railroad was removed to make way for the Westpark Tollway. In 2005, the Westpark Tollway was constructed on the former railroad right of way. A shopping center was built near the tollway on FM 1093. In April 2008, the Clodine General Store was moved to make room for the expansion of Farm to Market Road 1464.

On January 9, 2012, an F1 tornado struck Clodine. Several houses were damaged, with one suffering significant roof damage and ten others sustaining minor roof damage. Several fences were downed as well.

The Cartwright-McCrary House is a national historic landmark in Clodine.

== Geography ==
Clodine is located 12 mi (19 km) northeast of Richmond and 21 mi (34 km) southwest of Houston in Fort Bend County. It is located on Farm to Market Road 1464 and Alternate US Route 90.

== Education ==
Clodine had its own school in 1897.

Today, Clodine is within the Fort Bend Independent School District. It is served primarily by George Bush High School, Hodges Bend Middle School, Barbara Jordan Elementary School, and Mission West Elementary School.
