= Fort Bend County Toll Road Authority =

Toll road authority in Texas

Authority overview
- Formed: 1996
- Jurisdiction: Fort Bend County, Texas
- Headquarters: 1 Fluor Daniel Drive Sugar Land, TX 77478
- Website: www.fbctra.com

The Fort Bend County Toll Road Authority (FBCTRA), also called the Fort Bend Grand Parkway Toll Road Authority (FBGPTRA), operates three toll roads in Fort Bend County and is headquartered at 1 Fluor Daniel Dr in Sugar Land in the U.S. state of Texas.

== History ==
FBCTRA was established in 1996.

The FBCTRA uses Harris County Toll Road Authority's EZ TAG system, which is interoperable with the following:

1. TxTag issued by the Texas Department of Transportation.
2. TollTag issued by the North Texas Tollway Authority.
3. May 2017 - K-Tag issued by the Kansas Turnpike Authority.
4. May 2019 - PikePass issued by the Oklahoma Turnpike Authority.
5. FBCTRA does not accept cash or offer a pay-by-mail option on its toll roads

== Roadways ==
Number	Length (mi)	Length (km)	Southern or western terminus	Northern or eastern terminus	Formed	Removed	Notes
SH 99 Toll	12.7	20.4	I-69 / US 59	Fort Bend Westpark Tollway / FM 1093	2014	current	Section D; The FBGPTRA operates the SH-99 Toll (Grand Parkway Toll Road) from FM-1093 (Fort Bend Westpark Tollway) south to I-69/US-59 (Southwest Freeway) as a toll road with a series of tolled overpasses; The Texas Department of Transportation (TxDOT) operates the adjoining segments of the Grand Parkway (E, F1, F2 and G) from FM-1093 north to US-290 and then east to I-69/US-59 (Eastex Freeway).
Fort Bend Parkway Toll Road	8.9	14.3	Sienna Ranch Road in Missouri City	Beltway 8 / Sam Houston Tollway at Harris County Line	2004	current	Toll road continues north into Harris County as Fort Bend Toll Road (maintained by HCTRA) to Alternate U.S. 90 (South Main Street) in Houston. In July 2008 the authority converted the Fort Bend Parkway to EZ-Tag only, completely eliminating cash transactions for the agency and resulting in reduced toll collection and maintenance costs.
Fort Bend Westpark Tollway	8.3	13.4	FM 1093 east of Fulshear	Harris County line east of FM 1464	2005	current	Toll road continues east into Harris County as Westpark Tollway (maintained by HCTRA) to Westpark Drive and Post Oak Boulevard in Uptown Houston.
