= Trinity Parkway =

Highway in Dallas, Texas, USA

Route information
- Length: 10 mi (16 km)
- Existed: 2007–2017

Major junctions
- North end: I-35E / SH 183 in Dallas
- South end: I-45 / US 175 in Dallas

Location
- Country: United States
- State: Texas

Highway system
- Highways in Texas; Interstate; US; State; Former; Toll; Loops; Spurs; FM/RM; Park; Rec

The Trinity Parkway was a proposed six-lane toll road in Dallas, Texas (USA), to run from the State Highway 183/Interstate 35E interchange to the U.S. Highway 175/Interstate 45. The Dallas City Council voted 14-1 in 2007 to support a parkway inside the eastern levee of the Trinity River. Dallas City Council had recommended that a "context-sensitive design" be used for the parkway.

The project included 10 miles (16 km) of roadway, one main-lane toll plaza, 14 ramp toll plazas, and multiple interchanges that were planned to be constructed in part and operated by the North Texas Tollway Authority (NTTA). The construction of a new roadway in this area was one of several projects identified in a 1997 major investment study to relieve serious congestion near downtown Dallas. The NTTA had worked with the City of Dallas, the United States Army Corps of Engineers, and the Texas Department of Transportation (TxDOT) on this project.

The project, however, came under increased scrutiny from both the media and local figures in the City of Dallas. At issue was the project's financing, where $1.2 billion of the project's $1.5 billion in funding needed had yet to be identified. Critics had also pointed out that it appeared that the toll road would only provide marginal improvements to congestion in the area by increasing average speeds by two miles per hour. In March 2015, Dallas City Council Member Scott Griggs lambasted the project in a public meeting, calling it "the worst boondoggle imaginable" and claiming it would "cripple economic development".

On August 9, 2017, the Dallas City Council officially voted 13-2 to pull support for the Trinity Parkway, effectively canceling the project.
