= Fort Bend Parkway Toll Road =

Toll highway in Texas

Fort Bend Parkway Toll Road
- Fort Bend Toll Road
- Open section in red, portion under construction in blue

Route information
- Maintained by Fort Bend County Toll Road Authority and Harris County Toll Road Authority
- Length: 11.4 mi (18.3 km)
- Existed: 1988–present

Major junctions
- South end: Sienna Ranch Road in Missouri City
- SH 6 in Missouri City; Beltway 8 / Sam Houston Tollway in Houston
- North end: US 90 Alt. in Houston

Location
- Country: United States
- State: Texas
- Counties: Fort Bend, Harris

Highway system
- Highways in Texas; Interstate; US; State; Former; Toll; Loops; Spurs; FM/RM; Park; Rec
← SH 121	→ SH 123

The Fort Bend Parkway Toll Road is the Fort Bend County portion of a controlled-access toll road connecting Sienna in eastern Fort Bend County to US 90A in southwestern Harris County. It is administered by the Fort Bend County Toll Road Authority (FBCTRA). The Harris County Toll Road Authority (HCTRA) administers the Harris County (i.e., northern) segment of the road — from just south of Beltway 8 at the county line to US 90A — and uses its purple pentagonal shield labeled as Fort Bend Toll Road (the colloquial name for the entirety). It is proposed to reach a northern terminus at the southwestern corner of Interstate 610 in the future, and SH 99 at its southern terminus.

The toll road has two lanes in each direction with major interchanges at Sienna Parkway, State Highway 6, Lake Olympia Parkway, and FM 2234, and a connection, albeit not seamless, with Beltway 8. There are Toll Plazas between every interchange in FBCTRA territory. Originally, a main toll plaza was located north of FM 2234 with ramp tollbooths at FM 2234 and Lake Olympia Parkway. Another toll plaza was located north of Beltway 8 in the HCTRA segment. Currently, the FBCTRA is constructing an expansion to Sienna Ranch Road a little west of Sienna Parkway. The speed limit is 65 mph in the southern portion but drops to 60 mph inside Beltway 8.

The cost for the toll road is estimated between $55 million and $60 million.

== History and formation ==
The tollway's origins date back to a TxDOT (Texas Department of Transportation) original proposal of building a highway from the southwest corner of I-610 in Houston (where North Braeswood and I-610 meet). A section of frontage roads (later part of Hillcroft Avenue in Houston) was constructed in the late 1960s/early 1970s (date unknown) south of the proposed Beltway 8 (Sam Houston Tollway), south of Harris County adjacent to the Chasewood and Willow Park II subdivisions in northeast Fort Bend County.

Originally planned as either the West Loop Extension or the Bay City Freeway, the proposed freeway was cancelled in 1979 although remnants of the freeway exist (an extension of South Post Oak between West Bellfort and North/South Braeswood, along with a section of the Fort Bend Tollway between Beltway 8 and West Fuqua in Fort Bend County). Although the 1979 cancellation has ended TxDOT's highway proposal, Fort Bend County had an interest in the roadway project since 1984. On March 29, 1988, the parkway was officially designated by TxDOT as State Highway 122—stretching from Beltway 8 to the Grand Parkway (SH 99). Environmental and feasibility studies were conducted during the next 10 years.

In November 2000, citizens of Fort Bend County approved a $140 million bond issue to support revenue bond financing for construction of the Parkway and Westpark projects. On February 27, 2003, the State Highway 122 designation was removed from the section north of State Highway 6, as this section would be constructed by the Fort Bend County Toll Road Authority (FBCTRA). After fulfilling prudent feasibility studies and careful planning, Fort Bend County Toll Road Authority (FBCTRA) broke ground and began the construction phase in July 2003. The Fort Bend Parkway Toll Road opened August 30, 2004.

Harris County Commissioners' Court approved an approximate five-mile (8 km) extension of the proposed Fort Bend Parkway Toll Road project. While the primary corridor was constructed by the Fort Bend County Toll Road Authority, the extension was built by the Harris County Toll Road Authority and provides a connection from the Fort Bend County line at Beltway 8 to, currently, US Highway 90 Alternate, and in the future to the existing Post Oak Road at West Bellfort—near the southwest corner of I-610. In October 2019, HCTRA began to examine plans for the segment from US 90 Alternate to I-610 utilizing the original 2003 schematics. However, as of October 2020, the Harris County Commissioners Court put the Fort Bend Toll Road extension to I-610 on hold.

In July 2008, cash collection was discontinued on the Fort Bend Parkway Toll Road (maintained by FBCTRA). In 2015, FBCTRA replaced the Plazas and repositioned them to be on the road between interchanges. Cash collection (in the form of exact change) continued on the HCTRA maintained segment, the Fort Bend Toll Road until May 2017. The only valid payments on both segments of the toll road include HCTRA's EZ TAG, NTTA's TollTag, TxDOT's TxTAG and two out-of-state toll tags: K-TAG from Kansas (since May 2017) and Pikepass from Oklahoma (since May 2019).

On March 31, 2014, the FBCTRA opened a 1.8 mile, four-lane southern extension of the Fort Bend Parkway Toll Road to Sienna Parkway. FBCTRA began construction on an overpass over Hwy 6 in February 2015 and opened in March 2017. On February 26, 2015, SH 122 was removed from the state highway system as the section south of SH 6 was constructed by the FBCTRA, not by TXDOT. Currently, the FBCTRA is constructing an expansion to Sienna Ranch Road west of Sienna Parkway. The extension to Sienna Ranch Road was completed in February 2024.

== Signage and designation ==
The name of the road and its signage change along its route:

- Fort Bend Toll Road - from US 90 Alt to Beltway 8 / Sam Houston Parkway
- Fort Bend Parkway Toll Road - from Beltway 8 / Sam Houston Parkway to SH 99 (Grand Parkway)
- SH 122 or SH 122 Toll (cancelled) - formerly used for entire route while it was being built. Eventually, it was decided that the toll road would not use state funding, so the SH 122 designation was no longer necessary.

Although the Fort Bend Toll Road (Harris County) and the Fort Bend Parkway Toll Road (Fort Bend County) connect as one contiguous route, each is signed as a separate route. State Highway 122 existed as a placeholder for TxDOT in case it was decided to use state funding to build the toll road.

== Exit list ==
All exits are unnumbered.

County	Location	mi	km	Destinations	Notes
Fort Bend				SH 99 Toll (Grand Parkway)	Future southern terminus
Fort Bend	Missouri City	0.0	0.0	Sienna Ranch Road	Current southern terminus; southbound exit and northbound entrance
Fort Bend	Missouri City	0.9	1.4	Sienna Parkway	
Fort Bend	Missouri City	2.0	3.2	Sienna Parkway Toll Plaza; Electronic toll tags only, cash and pay-by-mail not allowed	
Fort Bend	Missouri City	2.5	4.0	SH 6	
Fort Bend	Missouri City	3.4	5.5	Trammel-Fresno Road	Free northbound exit for traffic entering Fort Bend Parkway Toll Road from SH 6 only
Fort Bend	Missouri City	4.1	6.6	Lake Olympia Toll Plaza; Electronic toll tags only, cash and pay-by-mail not allowed	
Fort Bend	Missouri City	4.5	7.2	Lake Olympia Parkway	
Fort Bend	Missouri City	6.1	9.8	McHard Toll Plaza; Electronic toll tags only, cash and pay-by-mail not allowed	
Fort Bend	Houston	6.3	10.1	FM 2234 (McHard Road)	
Fort Bend	Houston	7.2	11.6	Fondren Toll Plaza; Electronic toll tags only, cash and pay-by-mail not allowed	
Fort Bend	Houston	7.5	12.1	Fondren Road	Northbound exit and southbound entrance
Fort Bend–Harris county line	Houston	9.0	14.5	Fort Bend Tollway begins	Northern terminus of FBCTRA's Fort Bend Parkway Toll Road; southern terminus of HCTRA's Fort Bend Toll Road
Harris	Houston	9.1	14.6	Beltway 8 (Frontage Road) / Sam Houston Tollway	Access to Sam Houston Tollway via frontage roads
Harris	Houston	9.7	15.6	Toll gantry for both directions Electronic toll tags only, cash and pay-by-mail not allowed	
Harris	Houston	10.7	17.2	US 90 Alt. / Chimney Rock Road	Northbound exit and southbound entrance
Harris	Houston	11.4	18.3	US 90 Alt. east (South Main Street) to I-610	Northbound exit and southbound entrance
1.000 mi = 1.609 km; 1.000 km = 0.621 mi: Electronic toll collection; Incomplete access; Route transition; Unopened

The proposed SH 122 would extend from SH 6 to the planned segment of SH 99 that will be built to the south. In the future, South Post Oak Road/Chimney Rock Road will be a part of the Fort Bend Parkway Toll Road.
