= Little York Road =

Street in Houston, Texas, U.S.

- Length: 30.5 miles (49.1 km)
- Location: Houston, Texas, U.S.
- From: Mesa Road (Houston)
- Major junctions: US Highway 290; Hardy Toll Road; State Highway 6; Interstate 69/US Highway 59; Interstate 45; Beltway 8/Sam Houston Tollway
- To: Fry Road (Katy)

Little York Road is the longest street in Houston, Texas consisting of three segments totaling 30.5 miles (49.1 km). The main segment runs east–west in the northern part of Harris County from Mesa Road in Houston to just west of Fry Road in Cypress, spanning about 29.4 miles long and is known as West Little York Road on some parts westwards. Its major junctions include US Highway 290 (US 290), Hardy Toll Road, State Highway 6 (SH 6), Interstate 69 (I-69)/US Highway 59 (US 59), Interstate 45 (I-45) and the Beltway 8/Sam Houston Tollway.

The proposed extension of the main segment (east-west) would go from Westgreen Boulevard (its current western terminus) to Porter Road.

The middle segment of the street, referred to as "East Little York Road," is a short, east–west path from C.E. King Parkway and curves into Churchill Oaks Lane. This portion is 0.8 miles long.

The east segment begins at the North Sam Houston Parkway and concludes at Pineland Road at Sheldon Lake. This is the shortest of the three segments at 0.3 miles long.

A proposed expansion of Little York Road from John Ralson Road to North Sam Houston Parkway would interconnect the "middle" and "" segments.
