= Westpark Tollway =

Controlled-access toll road in Texas

Westpark Tollway
- Fort Bend Westpark Tollway
- Westpark Tollway highlighted in red. Outdated due to expansion near to Westheimer Lakes Drive.

Route information
- Maintained by Fort Bend County Toll Road Authority and Harris County Toll Road Authority
- Length: 22 mi (35 km)
- Existed: 2004–present

Major junctions
- West end: FM 1093
- FM 723; SH 99; SH 6; Beltway 8 / Sam Houston Tollway; I-69 / US 59; To I-610 via Westpark Drive
- East end: To I-610 via Post Oak Boulevard

Location
- Country: United States
- State: Texas

Highway system
- Highways in Texas; Interstate; US; State; Former; Toll; Loops; Spurs; FM/RM; Park; Rec

The Westpark Tollway, also Fort Bend Westpark Tollway, is a controlled-access toll road in Texas, serving western Houston and Harris County, and northeastern Fort Bend County. Construction on the facility began in 2001 and portions of the road were opened to traffic in May 2004. Construction of the roadway was completed in August 2005. The Westpark Tollway begins on Westpark Drive just past the South Rice Avenue intersection in the Uptown District of Houston and runs approximately 22 miles (35 km) west to Farm to Market Road 1093 just past Farm to Market Road 1463 in Fulshear, Texas. It runs roughly parallel and to the south of Westheimer Road (FM 1093) in Harris County and concurrently with FM 1093 in Fort Bend County.

The Harris County Toll Road Authority (HCTRA) and the Fort Bend County Toll Road Authority (FBCTRA) operate the Westpark Tollway jointly. The 14-mile (23 km) HCTRA section is simply named Westpark Tollway; however, the 8-mile (13 km) section of the toll road operated by the FBCTRA is named Fort Bend Westpark Tollway.

There are three major interchanges along the route: the Southwest Freeway (I-69)/(US 59), the West Sam Houston Tollway (Beltway 8), and Grand Parkway (State Highway 99), along with several minor interchanges. The namesake of the tollway is Westpark Drive—an east–west major arterial running through a mostly industrial area. Like other toll roads in the Houston area, the speed limit is 65 mph (105 km/h)—even inside Beltway 8.

The Westpark Tollway was the first fully electronic toll road in the United States. There are no tollbooths or toll collectors along either section of the route. The only way to legally drive on the road is by using a transponder unit attached to a vehicle's windshield (either HCTRA's EZ TAG or an interoperable tag). These transponders communicate with overhead sensors to deduct tolls from the user's toll account.

== Fort Bend County section ==
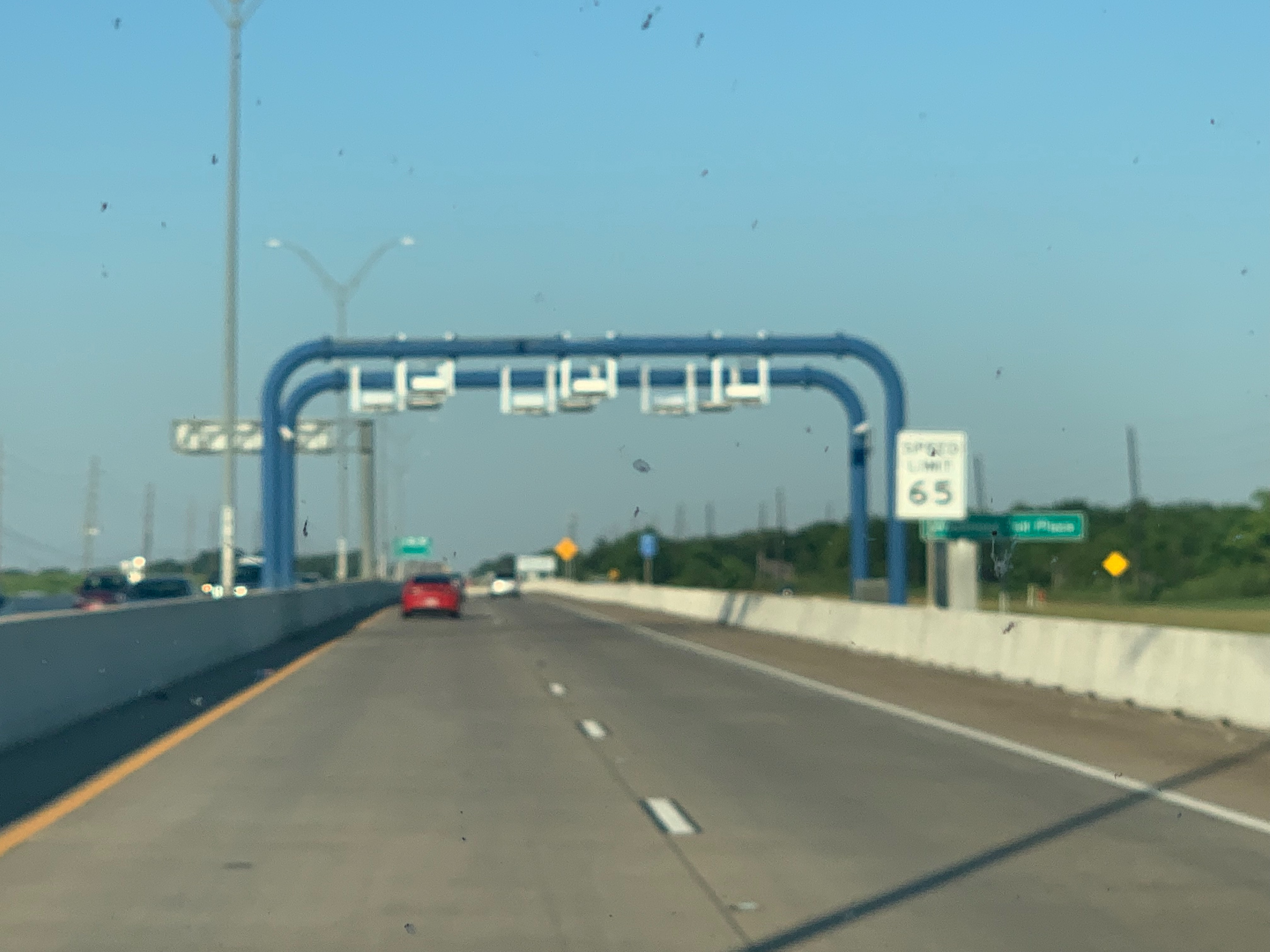
The Westmoor Toll Gantry on the Westpark Tollway

The Fort Bend section ties into the HCTRA portion of the tollway and is operated by the Fort Bend County Toll Road Authority (FBCTRA), under the alias of the Fort Bend Westpark Tollway. The project, completed on August 10, 2005, improves auto mobility for residents in northeastern Fort Bend County by creating a new east–west corridor with access to State Highway 6, Sam Houston Tollway (Beltway 8), I-69/US 59, and the Uptown District of Houston.

The Fort Bend section of the Westpark Tollway is patrolled by Fort Bend County Constable, Precinct 4. Additional coverage is provided by the Fort Bend County Sheriff's Department or other agencies as needed.

=== Future segments ===
Parallel to the Fort Bend Westpark Tollway, FM 1093 has been widened by Texas Department of Transportation (TxDOT) to four lanes. FM 1093 at this location serves as a toll-free frontage road for the tollway. The Fort Bend Westpark Tollway will add an additional four lanes to this effort—resulting in an eight-lane road. TxDOT is funding construction of the tollway interchanges at State Highway 99 and FM 1464.

Additionally, a 2012 expansion plan shows a Westpark Tollway addition to the city of Fulshear, Texas. The expansion promises a connection with the future Fulshear Parkway, and additional direct connection flyovers with SH-99. Construction of phase one to extend Westpark Tollway from the Grand Parkway to just west of Spring Green Boulevard began in February 2016 and was finished in November 2017. From 2017 to 2020, FM 1093 was expanded from two to four lanes from the Grand Parkway to James Lane near Fulshear; the highway will serve as frontage roads for future extensions of the Westpark Tollway. In July 2026, an extension opened from FM 723 to FM 1463.

== Harris County section ==
The Harris County portion of the tollway right-of-way was acquired by HCTRA from METRO, which had previously purchased the entire railroad right-of-way from Southern Pacific in 1992.

The Westpark corridor has a storied history as a transportation possibility. Originally on the books in the 1950s as the location of what is now Interstate 69/U.S. Highway 59 (Southwest Freeway) before developers lured it south to serve Sharpstown, the Westpark corridor has seen several transportation plans. The first time a toll road was mentioned was in a 1979 survey of several routes by the Texas Turnpike Authority, leading to the construction of the Hardy Toll Road in Northern Harris County by HCTRA. A heavy rail line along the corridor was floated in the 1980s, but failed to win voter approval, along with a monorail that was ended with Mayor Kathy Whitmire in 1991. Another commuter rail idea ended as METRO purchased the corridor and planned to run trains, but reversed itself and floated plans for a reversible high occupancy vehicle and bus transit lane to supplement the Southwest Freeway, tearing out the tracks in the mid 1990s. In 1999, HCTRA and METRO reached an agreement for half of the 100-foot (30 m) right-of-way to go towards a toll road run by HCTRA and the other half for use by METRO for light rail. Whether or not it will be the main corridor for the University Line is a contentious issue; Richmond Avenue, to the north, emerged as another option under consideration, along with the fact that Westpark Drive and its corresponding railroad right-of-way do not intersect METRORail at any point, much less Wheeler Station, which was chosen as the junction between the lines. As of 2006, a final corridor had not been chosen. As of 2014, a combination of Westpark and Richmond had been chosen as the University Line (METRORail), but the city had not allocated money for the project.

== Exit list ==
All exits are unnumbered.

County	Location	mi	km	Destinations	Notes
Fort Bend				FM 1093 west (Westheimer Road), Cross Creek Ranch Rd	Westbound exit and eastbound entrance
Fort Bend				FM 1463 Toll Plaza; Electronic toll tags only, cash and pay-by-mail not allowed	
Fort Bend				FM 1463	Westbound exit and eastbound entrance
Fort Bend				FM 723 (Spring Green Boulevard)	No eastbound exit
Fort Bend				Katy Gaston Toll Plaza; Electronic toll tags only, cash and pay-by-mail not allowed	
Fort Bend				Katy-Gaston Road	Westbound exit and eastbound entrance
Fort Bend				SH 99 north (Grand Parkway)	Direct ramps to northbound Grand Parkway from eastbound and westbound Westpark Tollway
Fort Bend				SH 99 (Grand Parkway)	Northern terminus of FBCTRA's Grand Parkway Toll Road
Fort Bend				Peek Road	Westbound exit and eastbound entrance
Fort Bend				Peek Toll Plaza; Electronic toll tags only, cash and pay-by-mail not allowed	
Fort Bend				Mason Road / Grand Mission Boulevard	No westbound entrance
Fort Bend				Westmoor Toll Plaza; Electronic toll tags only, cash and pay-by-mail not allowed	
Fort Bend				Grand Mission Boulevard	Westbound exit and eastbound entrance
Fort Bend				SH 6 / FM 1093 / FM 1464 / Barker Cypress Road / Westheimer Road	
Fort Bend–Harris county line				Westpark Tollway begins	Eastern terminus of FBCTRA's Fort Bend Westpark Tollway; western terminus of HCTRA's Westpark Tollway
Harris				Westpark Drive	Westbound exit and eastbound entrance
Harris				SH 6 north	Westbound exit and westbound entrance
Harris				To SH 6 south / Eldridge Parkway / Synott Rd	Westbound exit and eastbound entrance
Harris				Cook Road	Eastbound exit only
Harris				West Houston Center Boulevard / Dairy Ashford Road / Cook Road	Westbound exit and eastbound entrance
Harris				Wilcrest Mainlane Toll Plaza; Electronic toll tags only, cash and pay-by-mail not allowed	
Harris				Beltway 8 (Frontage Road) / Sam Houston Tollway	Includes direct ramp from eastbound Westpark Tollway to southbound Sam Houston Tollway
Harris				Gessner Road	No westbound exit
Harris				Fondren Road / Gessner Road / Hillcroft Avenue	No westbound entrance
Harris				Fondren Mainlane Toll Plaza; Electronic toll tags only, cash and pay-by-mail not allowed	
Harris				I-69 north / US 59 north - Downtown	Eastbound exit and westbound entrance; eastbound entrance from I-69/US 59 northbound; westbound entrance from I-69/US 59 southbound, exit 121B; I-69 does not appear on exit signage
Harris				Westpark Drive	Eastbound exit and westbound entrance
Harris				Post Oak Boulevard / Richmond Avenue	Eastbound exit only
1.000 mi = 1.609 km; 1.000 km = 0.621 mi: Electronic toll collection; Incomplete access; Route transition; Unopened
