= Harris County Toll Road Authority =

Government authority in Houston, Texas, US

Agency overview
- Formed: September 1983
- Jurisdiction: Harris County, Texas
- Headquarters: 7701 Wilshire Place Drive Houston, TX 77040; 29.857062°N 95.508666°W
- Agency executive: Roberto Treviño, Executive Director
- Parent department: Harris County Public Infrastructure Department
- Website: hctra.org

The Harris County Toll Road Authority (HCTRA, pronounced "HECK-trah") maintains and operates a 103-mile (165.8 km) toll road system in the Greater Houston area of Texas, United States. Its headquarters are located in Houston's Fairbanks/Northwest Crossing neighborhood.

== History ==
HCTRA came into being in September 1983 after Harris County voters approved a $900 million bond referendum by a 7–3 margin to release up to $900 million in bonds to create two toll roads – the Hardy Toll Road and the Sam Houston Tollway – to improve the regional mobility and reduce traffic congestion in the Greater Houston area, an area known for rapid population growth.

The need for a county-run toll road system came from TxDOT's budget shortfall and its inability to authorize funding to upgrade the second loop around the city, Beltway 8, which had been on planning maps since the 1950s. The Texas Turnpike Authority turned down the opportunity to improve the road as well, leaving the county to upgrade the road to freeway standards. However, Harris County could not afford to build and maintain a freeway from its general fund.

Shortly after the referendum, the Commissioners Court created the Toll Road Authority to administer the construction and operation of the new road system. Then-County Judge Jon Lindsay is generally credited with shepherding the referendum from its infancy to its passage, along with the implementation of the plan for the roadway. HCTRA was a part of Harris County's Public Infrastructure Department and is subdivided into a Services and an Operations Division.

While for many years, the Hardy Toll Road never had the traffic that the HCTRA envisioned it would need to turn a profit, the Sam Houston Tollway has more than made up for the lost revenue. The high profit margins on the Sam Houston Tollway allowed the authority to construct its third and fourth toll roads, the Westpark Tollway and Fort Bend Toll Road, both of which opened in 2004. Both of these toll roads have termini in Fort Bend County and are run in conjunction with the Fort Bend County Toll Road Authority. HCTRA also operates managed lanes that run along the median of I-10/Katy Freeway between SH 6 and I-610 that opened in April 2009. The most recently completed project of HCTRA is the Tomball Tollway, which was completed in phases between 2015 and 2019.

On March 1, 2020, operations of the Lynchburg Ferry and the Washburn Tunnel were transferred from Harris County Precinct 2 to the Harris County Toll Road Authority. There are no plans for HCTRA to implement tolls either the Lynchburg Ferry or the Washburn Tunnel. Nevertheless, HCTRA's involvement will include plans to improve the operations of both facilities, as well as much-needed repairs and upgrades.

HCTRA has been interoperable with the Texas Department of Transportation's TxTag and the North Texas Tollway Authority's TollTag since 2003. The system is now interoperable with the Kansas Turnpike Authority's K-Tag, the Oklahoma Turnpike Authority's PikePass, and other transponders.

On Nov 9, 2024, it was announced that HCTRA would be taking over toll collection and customer service operations of toll roads under the TxTag system. The transition occurred in phases starting November 15, 2024.

== Current system ==
HCTRA uses their own toll tag called the EZ TAG, which is interoperable with all toll roads in Texas, Oklahoma, and Kansas. Some toll roads in other states are also compatible. Only toll tags are accepted at toll plazas.

Toll roads within Harris County that are not listed in this section are not under HCTRA jurisdiction. These include the Grand Parkway (SH 99 Toll) and the SH 288 toll lanes.

The following toll roads (in order of first segment completion) form the current HCTRA system:

=== Sam Houston Tollway (1982) ===
The Sam Houston Tollway is the name given to the tolled sections of Beltway 8, the second highway loop around Houston. The first opened section was the Sam Houston Ship Channel Bridge in the east quadrant of the road system. From 1982 to 1994, the bridge, which was originally named in honor of local politician and entrepreneur Jesse H. Jones, was maintained by the Texas Turnpike Authority (now NTTA). As of February 26, 2011, the Sam Houston Tollway is a complete tolled beltway loop around Houston (minus a few minor sections that are freeways managed by TxDOT).

=== Hardy Toll Road (1988) ===
The Hardy Toll Road was constructed to help alleviate traffic off of I-45 North. The route begins at I-610 North between I-45 North and I-69/US 59 North and travels northward parallel to I-45 for 21.6 miles (34.8 km) after which it merges onto I-45. The toll road also features a 4-mile (6.4 km) spur to George Bush Intercontinental Airport.

=== Westpark Tollway (2004) ===
The Westpark Tollway is a 22-mile (35.4 km) toll road starting in Uptown Houston and traveling westward parallel to sections of Westpark Drive and FM 1093 and terminating just past FM 723 in Fulshear, Texas. It is the first all-electronic toll road in the United States. The Fort Bend County Toll Road Authority (FBCTRA) operates the section of the tollway in Fort Bend County.

=== Fort Bend Toll Road (2004) ===
The Fort Bend Toll Road is a 8.9-mile (14.3 km) tollway that follows the route of the formerly-cancelled State Highway 122. The toll road currently begins with direct connectors at US 90A, just north of the Sam Houston Tollway, and travels southward to its terminus at Sienna Ranch Road in Missouri City. As with the Westpark Tollway, the Fort Bend Toll Road is jointly operated with the FBCTRA.

=== Katy Freeway Managed Lanes (2009) ===
In 2002, HCTRA entered into an agreement with TxDOT and Harris County for the reconstruction of I-10/Katy Freeway. The toll road authority's portion of the project is a 12-mile (19.3 km) managed lane facility in the center of the reconstructed freeway. METRO and HOV vehicles use it at no charge during peak hours. The four lane roadway, running between I-610/West Loop and SH 6, has been completed. The lanes opened during the second quarter of 2009.

=== Tomball Tollway (2015) ===
The Tomball Tollway is a 10.8-mile (17.4 km) segment of three toll lanes in each direction from Spring Cypress Road up to Tomball. SH 249 serves as toll-free frontage roads for the tollway. Tolling is all-electronic; an EZ TAG or interoperable toll tag is required for passage. Construction of Phase I, between Spring Cypress Road and FM 2920, began in Fall 2013 and was finished on April 12, 2015. Phase II of the project, in partnership with Montgomery County Toll Road Authority, extends the tollway north to Sentinel Oaks just north of Spring Creek in Montgomery County. Construction of Phase II commenced in Spring 2017 and was completed in December 2019.

== Future projects ==
=== Hardy Downtown Connector ===
This 3.6-mile (5.8 km) long project will provide a connection between Downtown Houston and the current terminus of the Hardy Toll Road at I-610. Planning for the Hardy Toll Road connection into Downtown Houston was announced in 2000. The project will be completed in two phases. Phase I consists of moving a railroad line, right of way acquisition, and the construction of two overpasses. Phase II will be the construction of 4 toll lanes.

=== Hardy Toll Road Interchange at Beltway 8 ===
To relieve congestion on surface streets, direct connectors between Hardy Toll Road and Beltway 8 will be constructed. Currently there is only one direct connector ramp from Beltway 8 East to Hardy Toll Road North. Expected construction start date is unknown.

=== Tomball Tollway direct connectors at SH 99 ===
This project (which began in early 2020) will add a total of four direct connectors: two from northbound Tomball Tollway to east and westbound SH 99 (Grand Parkway), with the other two connecting to southbound Tomball Tollway from east and westbound SH 99. Ramps from SH 99 to southbound Tomball Tollway opened in July 2022; Tomball Tollway ramps to SH 99 remain under construction.

=== Sam Houston Tollway – Ship Channel Bridge (SH 225 to IH 10/East Freeway) ===
A second span will be constructed over the ship channel with three or four lanes with full shoulders in each direction. The first phase of the plan involved the conversion of the bridge's toll plazas into electronic toll collection, which was implemented on January 11, 2016. In April 2018, the project broke ground, but construction paused later that year. Construction resumed in 2021. The bridge is expected to be completed in 2030.

=== Fort Bend Parkway/South Post Oak Road Extension ===
The project will connect I-610 via the South Post Oak exit (which terminates south of West Bellfort) to the northern terminus of the Fort Bend Parkway at US 90 Alternate with just over 3 miles (4.8 km) of tolled lanes. In October 2019, HCTRA began to examine plans for the segment utilizing the original 2003 schematics.

== Former or cancelled projects ==
=== Fairmont Parkway toll road ===
The project was a concept to link the Sam Houston Tollway with SH 146. In September 2009, Harris County announced the cancellation of the project.

=== Hempstead Highway/US 290 managed lanes ===
The planned project would have added four tolled lanes along the Hempstead Highway corridor between I-610 and the future Grand Parkway (SH 99) northwest segment. The project was one component of the complete US 290 corridor upgrade by TxDOT, which also included added capacity to US 290, a new HOV system parallel to the Hempstead Highway, and a possible commuter rail line in conjunction with METRO. However, in April 2012, it was announced by HCTRA that the primacy of the Hempstead Tollway was handed off to TxDOT. Construction of the tollway by TxDOT is not anticipated for several years.

=== SH 242/I-45 flyover ramps (2015) ===
Although both of them are located within Montgomery County and were at the time owned and operated by Montgomery County Toll Road Authority (MCTRA), HCTRA formerly collected tolls for MCTRA for two flyover ramps: one from northbound I-45 to SH 242 westbound and the other from westbound SH 242 to I-45 southbound near The Woodlands. Both flyover ramps were completed on May 11, 2015, and were tolled between July 6, 2015, and May 28, 2019. Both ramps solely utilized electronic toll collection, and required drivers to own an EZ TAG or an interoperable transponder. After a unanimous vote by the Montgomery County Commissioners Court on May 28, 2019, the tolls were lifted, and ownership and maintenance of both flyover ramps were transferred to the Texas Department of Transportation (TxDOT). As a result, HCTRA stopped collecting tolls on the flyover ramps.

=== SH 288 managed lanes ===
To help alleviate congestion on SH 288, HCTRA had planned to construct toll lanes in the median of the existing freeway. The route would begin at I-69/US 59 just south of Midtown and terminate at the intersection of the proposed Grand Parkway (SH 99) for a total length of 26 miles (41.8 km). HCTRA would have maintain its segment north of Clear Creek at the Brazoria County Line. Shortly before construction began in November 2016, TxDOT's Toll Operations Division took control of the project from HCTRA.

== See also ==
Texas State Highway 99
