= Mountain Creek Lake Bridge =

- Coordinates: 32.707000°N 96.966000°W
- Carries: Motor vehicles
- Crosses: Mountain Creek Lake
- Locale: Grand Prairie, Texas and Dallas, Texas
- Maintained by: North Texas Tollway Authority
- ID number: 1805709K2550006

Characteristics
- Design: Stringer/Multi-beam or Girder
- Total length: 7,425 ft (2263.1 m)
- Width: 33.46 ft (10.2 m)
- Load limit: 48.6 tons (44.1 metric tons)

History
- Opened: April 1979

Statistics
- Daily traffic: 8250 (in 2001)
- Toll: $0.70 for two axles

The Mountain Creek Lake Bridge is a bridge in Dallas County, Texas. The bridge is part of the North Texas Tollway Authority (NTTA) system. It is tolled in both directions (toll is collected on the west end of the bridge), and the lanes of the Mountain Creek Lake Bridge toll plaza are equipped for electronic toll collection via TollTag.

The bridge connects Spur 303 between Grand Prairie and Dallas across Mountain Creek Lake.
