= NationalPass =

NationalPass is an interoperable service created by TransCore, which is designed to eventually provide single transponder access to all public toll roads and bridges in North America.

== Background ==
Currently there are 13 different networks of toll highways in the United States. Transponders used with each network are not interoperable with the other networks, requiring trucking companies and individual drivers who travel between those networks to maintain multiple transponders. In 2012, Congress passed the Moving Ahead for Progress in the 21st Century Act, and among its provisions are requirements to ease the burden of tolled interstate travel by providing a single interoperable toll tag and account. NationalPass was designed to meet the 2016 federal deadline without requiring toll agencies to retrofit old toll stations.

== Implementation ==
NationalPass tags include transponders for IAG/TDM (e.g. E-ZPass), SeGo (e.g. TxTag), Title-21 (e.g. FasTrak), and ATA (e.g. EZ TAG). TransCore establishes fleet accounts with each of the interoperable states and bills NationalPass customers directly. No changes or special accommodations are required by the participating states. NationalPass charges a fee to acquire the tag, and charges users an $8–$11 monthly fee. As of November 2023, NationalPass works in California, Delaware, Florida, Georgia, Illinois, Indiana, Kansas, Kentucky, Maine, Maryland, Massachusetts, Minnesota, New Hampshire, New Jersey, New York, North Carolina, Ohio, Oklahoma, Pennsylvania, Rhode Island, Texas, Virginia, and West Virginia, but is not yet compatible with systems in all states, including those in Alabama, Colorado, Louisiana, Michigan, South Carolina, Utah, and Washington.
