= Farm to Market Road 1464 =

Road in Texas, United States

Farm to Market Road 1464

Route information
- Maintained by TxDOT
- Length: 7.649 mi (12.310 km)
- Existed: July 22, 1949–present

Major junctions
- South end: SH 99 at Sugar Land
- Old Richmond Road; West Airport Road; Beechnut Street
- North end: FM 1093 in Clodine

Location
- Country: United States
- State: Texas
- Counties: Fort Bend

Highway system
- Highways in Texas; Interstate; US; State; Former; Toll; Loops; Spurs; FM/RM; Park; Rec
← FM 1463	→ FM 1465

Farm to Market Road 1464 (FM 1464) is a state highway in the U.S. state of Texas that stays within Fort Bend County. The highway starts from State Highway 99 (SH 99) in Sugar Land and goes north to FM 1093 at Clodine. The four-lane divided highway passes through both rural and suburban areas.

== Route description ==
FM 1464 begins at a traffic signal on SH 99 about 300 yards (274 m) north of the intersection of SH 99 and U.S. Route 90A (US 90 Alt.). The location is also a short distance to the north of a railroad underpass. FM 1464 initially starts east but then veers to the north and continues in a northerly direction as a four-lane divided highway for virtually its entire course. From the starting point for about 1.0 mile (1.6 km), the highway passes through a rural area, except for the Chelsea Harbor subdivision, which is on the east side. Entering an area flanked on both sides by the Stratford Park Village and Orchard Lake Estates subdivisions, FM 1464 comes to a traffic signal at Old Richmond Road and the Macario Garcia Middle School, which is on the east side. In this area, on the left, is Black Hawk Country Club with views of the 8th and 9th holes. The highway turns more to the northeast before passing Stephen F. Austin High School on the east side, then turns north again before coming to a traffic light at West Airport Road. At this point, FM 1464 enters its 2010-designated right-of-way (see History). The pre-2010 right-of-way is known as Clodine Road which is accessible from Denver Miller Road and continues directly north. From West Airport to West Bellfort Road, FM 1464 curves to the north-northwest through an open area. Between West Bellfort and Madden Road, the highway passes through the Aliana subdivision and bends back to the north. From Madden Road to the traffic signal at Beechnut Street the aspect is rural.

The drainage ditch 200 yards (183 m) south of the traffic signal at Beechnut Street was the place where a 0.5-mile-long (0.8 km) east–west segment of the former FM 1464 right-of-way connected with Clodine Road. The next north-bound signal after Beechnut is at Clodine Road/Orchard Ridge Lane. Mission West Elementary School is on the east side. Going north, there are traffic lights at Highland Oak Lane/Watering Oaks Lane and Bellaire Boulevard. The traffic signal at West Oaks Village Drive provides access to George H. W. Bush High School on the east side and West Oaks Village subdivision on the west side. After a short distance, FM 1464 crosses under the Westpark Tollway. There are entrance and exit ramps between the tollway and FM 1464. North of the underpass, the highway widens into an eight-lane road for about 200 yards (183 m) before ending at a traffic signal at FM 1093. There is a Kroger store on the east side. This location is a few hundred feet west of the Harris County boundary. The road north of FM 1093, which is not part of FM 1464, is called South Barker Cypress Road.

== History ==
FM 1464 was originally designated on July 22, 1949, to go from U.S. Route 59 (US 59) north 7.9 miles (12.7 km) to FM 1093 at Clodine. A 1955 map shows that US 59 shared the same route that is used by US 90 Alt. in 2012, which is about 3.0 miles (4.8 km) north of the path of US 59 in 2012. On December 12, 1994, FM 1464 was realigned to connect with SH 99 at distance 0.12 miles (0.19 km) north of US 90 Alt. This was done by a spur connection of length 0.07 miles (0.11 km). On August 26, 2010, FM 1464 was realigned between Beechnut Road and West Airport Road so that its total distance was 7.649 miles (12.310 km). The old right-of-way was removed from the state highway system. (Note: The 1994 length was given as 9.14 miles by TxDOT which may be a typographical error.)

== Major intersections ==
The entire highway is in Fort Bend County.

Location	mi	km	Destinations	Notes
Sugar Land	0.0	0.0	SH 99 (Grand Parkway)	Southern terminus of FM 1464
	2.0	3.2	Old Richmond Road	
	4.4	7.1	West Airport Road	
Mission Bend	6.0	9.7	Beechnut Street	
Clodine	7.65	12.31	FM 1093	Northern terminus of FM 1464
1.000 mi = 1.609 km; 1.000 km = 0.621 mi

== Notes ==
Footnotes

Citations
