= Addison Airport Toll Tunnel =

Road tunnel in Addison, Texas, U.S.

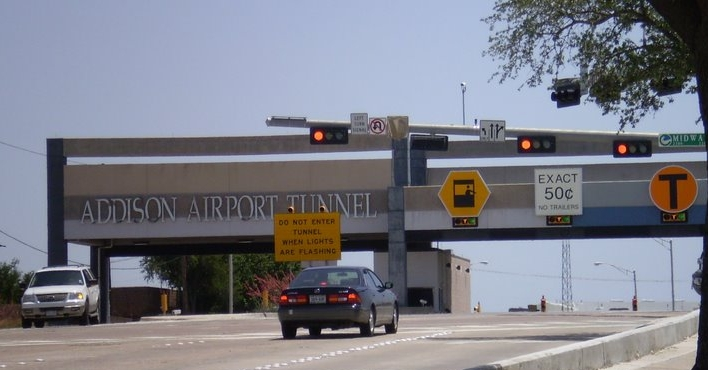
- Toll plaza in 2008

Overview
- Other name: AATT
- Location: Addison, Texas
- Coordinates: 32.9685°N 96.8360°W
- Route: Keller Springs Road
- Crosses: Addison Airport
- Start: Midway Road
- End: Addison Road

Operation
- Work began: September 1997
- Opened: February 18, 1999
- Operator: North Texas Tollway Authority
- Toll: $0.78 by electronic toll collection $1.56 by mail invoice

Technical
- Length: 1,600 feet (490 m)
- No. of lanes: 2
- Operating speed: 40 miles per hour (64 km/h)
- Tunnel clearance: 16 feet 6 inches (5.03 m)

The Addison Airport Toll Tunnel (abbreviated AATT) is a road tunnel in Addison, Texas, that carries Keller Springs Road underneath Addison Airport. The tunnel is operated by the North Texas Tollway Authority (NTTA) and uses open road tolling through NTTA's TollTag system.

The tunnel connects the western and eastern barrier roads of Addison Airport (Midway Road and Addison Road, respectively). This provides a through passage between Dallas North Tollway and Interstate 35E, reducing traffic on Belt Line Road and Trinity Mills Road.

The tunnel proper is 1,600 feet (488 m) long, while the entire roadway is 3,700 feet (1,128 m) long. Tolls are collected at a plaza on the west side of the roadway. As of July 2025, two-axle vehicles are charged $0.78 if paying via electronic toll collection or $1.56 if paying by mail invoice; this price increases for each additional axle.

== History ==
=== Background ===
Construction of an airport in the newly incorporated town of Addison was proposed in 1956. Construction of the 4,500-foot (1,400 m) primary runway would require severing Keller Springs Road, a major arterial route in northern Dallas County. This proposal created controversy, but after successful negotiations between Addison and the Dallas County Commissioners' Court, the project was approved. Construction on Addison Airport began on March 16, 1957, and the portion of Keller Springs Road crossing the new airport was demolished.

Initially, motorists on Keller Springs could travel around the airport by detouring north on Westgrove Road. However, in 1969, the runway was extended further north to a total of 7,200 feet (2,200 m), and Westgrove was realigned so it no longer reached the airport's west side. The closest east-west roads to the airport were now Trinity Mills Road to the north and Belt Line Road to the south, which were 2 miles (3 km) apart. Traffic on Belt Line Road, which was closer to Keller Springs, began to surpass its design capacity by 10,000 vehicles per day. In 1984, Addison city manager Ron Whitehead began calling for the two sections of Keller Springs Road to be reconnected to relieve the traffic congestion.

=== Construction ===
Original (left) and current (right) signage

In 1991, the Texas Turnpike Authority (NTTA's predecessor) conducted a preliminary study for a tunnel connecting the segments. The study proposed a 75¢ toll and predicted that such a toll would raise $4.7 million per year. Dallas County voters approved $3 million in bonds to purchase the right-of-way, but the project did not proceed further due to high costs.

In 1995, the project was revisited and approved. The tunnel was budgeted at $26.8 million, and the planned toll rate was reduced to 50¢. Tunneling work began in September 1997, with a large roadheader, nicknamed "Big Mike", used to cut through the Austin Chalk under the airport. The tunnel was completed and opened to the public on February 18, 1999. Within a year, daily traffic through the tunnel exceeded 10,000 vehicles.

In 2007, NTTA announced the removal of its toll booths (both staffed and coin-operated) at all of its facilities by 2010 in favor of a pay-by-mail system. AATT's toll booths were removed in 2009.

== Citations ==
=== Bibliography ===
- Bleakley, Bruce (2017). Addison Airport: Serving Business Aviation for 60 Years, 1957–2017. Dallas, Texas: Brown Books Publishing Group. ISBN 978-1-61254-839-5.
