= Texas State Highway 99 =

State highway in Texas, United States

State Highway 99
- Grand Parkway
- Opened section of SH 99, highlighted in red.

Route information
- Maintained by TxDOT and FBCTRA
- Length: 176.6 mi (284.2 km)
- Existed: August 1994–present

Major junctions
- Loop around Houston
- CCW end: I-69 / US 59 / FM 2759 in Sugar Land
- I-10 / US 90 in Katy; US 290 / SH 6 in Cypress; SH 249 / Tomball Tollway in Tomball; I-45 in Spring; I-69 / US 59 in New Caney; US 90 near Dayton; I-10 near Mont Belvieu
- CW end: SH 146 in Baytown

Location
- Country: United States
- State: Texas
- Counties: Fort Bend, Harris, Montgomery, Liberty, Chambers

Highway system
- Highways in Texas; Interstate; US; State; Former; Toll; Loops; Spurs; FM/RM; Park; Rec
← SH 98	→ SH 100

State Highway 99 (SH 99), also known as the Grand Parkway, is a partial beltway in the U.S. state of Texas. Its first section opened on August 31, 1994. If the route is completed, it will be the longest beltway in the U.S., the world's eighth-longest metropolitan ring road (and largest outside of China, Russia, and Egypt), and the third (outer) loop of the Houston–Pasadena–The Woodlands metropolitan area, with Interstate 610 being the first (inner) loop and Beltway 8 (Sam Houston Tollway) being the second (middle) loop. The proposed 176.6-mile (284.2 km) loop has been divided into 11 separate segments for construction and funding purposes. In May 2019, the Texas Department of Transportation gave the Grand Parkway a secondary designation as the Mayor Bob Lanier Memorial Parkway, honoring Bob Lanier, who served as the mayor of Houston from 1992 to 1998 and who had spearheaded the creation of the Grand Parkway.

== History ==
Historic SH 99

A previous route designated SH 99 was established on August 18, 1924, from San Angelo to Fort Stockton. On June 25, 1929, SH 99 was extended to Alpine. On March 2, 1932, a spur to Sherwood with the designation SH 99A was added, but was maintained by the county. On July 23, 1934, this route was transferred to SH 10, and SH 99A was cancelled by then. The route is part of present-day U.S. Route 67 (US 67).

On October 29, 1960, a new route was designated for SH 99, from Denton to the Oklahoma state line as a renumbering of SH 10, to match OK 99 at the border. On April 29, 1968, this route became part of US 377.

On October 25, 1984, SH 99 was designated along a very similar route to its current one, but ending at SH 146 (then Loop 201) and Spur 330. On March 28, 2002, SH 99 was rerouted further east along a new route south to Spur 55 and along Spur 55 to Business SH 146. Spur 55 was cancelled, effective upon the completion of that section of SH 99 in 2008.

== Route description ==
The Grand Parkway project is divided into several segments for construction and administrative purposes. The section from Interstate 69 (I-69) in Sugar Land north to the Westpark Tollway is the southern portion of Segment D and is maintained by the Fort Bend County Toll Road Authority. The remainder of Segment D, which runs from the Westpark Tollway north to I-10, along with the other completed segments as of 2022, are maintained by the Texas Department of Transportation.

Speed limits on the Grand Parkway are 65 to 75 mph (105 to 121 km/h).

Tolls may be paid using one of the Texas toll tag transponders (TxTag, EZ TAG, and TollTag), the Kansas Turnpike Authority's K-TAG, or the Oklahoma Turnpike Authority's Pikepass. No cash payments are accepted. As of 2020, a pay-by-mail option is available on segments maintained by TxDOT.

Segment	Status	(Planned) completion	From	To	Length (miles)	(Future) Toll Road
A	Currently not considered a viable project	Unknown	SH 146	I-45	TBD	(yes)
B	Construction on Segment B-1 will start in Spring 2027; the construction of the rest of the segment does not have a start date	(2030)	I-45	SH 288	28.0	(yes)
C	Construction was originally scheduled to begin in August 2016, but the plans were re-evaluated and re-approved on March 9, 2017	Unknown	SH 288	I-69 / US 59	26.0	(yes)
D	Completed; toll collected	1994	I-69 / US 59	I-10 / US 90	18.2	partial (I-10 to WPT untolled, WPT to I-69 tolled)
E	Completed; toll collected	2013	I-10 / US 90	US 290 / SH 6	15.2	yes
F-1	Completed; toll collected	2016	US 290 / SH 6	SH 249 / Tomball Tollway	11.9	yes
F-2	Completed; toll collected	2016	SH 249 / Tomball Tollway	I-45	12.1	yes
G	Completed; toll collected	2016	I-45	I-69 / US 59	13.6	yes
H & I-1	Completed; toll collected	2022	I-69 / US 59	I-10	37.4	yes
I-2	Completed; toll collected	2008	I-10	SH 146	14.5	yes

=== Segment A ===
Segment A would extend from SH 146 near San Leon to I-45 in League City. As of November 2022, it is not considered a viable project.

=== Segment B ===
Segment B will extend from I-45 in League City to SH 288 near Rosharon. In mid-October 2023, TxDOT announced that it would begin construction on Segment B-1, which will connect I-45 to SH 35 in Alvin, in Spring 2027 with it completion set for 2030. Open houses on the project were requested during this part of the month as well.

=== Segment C ===
Segment C will extend from SH 288 near Rosharon to I-69/US 59 in Sugar Land. Construction was originally scheduled to begin in August 2016, but the plans were re-evaluated and re-approved on March 9, 2017. No timeline for construction is set.

=== Segment D ===
Segment D, the first section opened, runs from just north of I-10/US 90, west of Houston, south to I-69/US 59 in Sugar Land, where it terminates and intersects with FM 2759. The portion of this segment south of the interchange with the Westpark Tollway is now a four-lane divided highway feeder road, with mainlanes crossing over the Westpark Tollway.

The 18-month-long construction of two ramps connecting westbound I-10/US 90 to southbound SH 99 and northbound SH 99 to eastbound I-10/US 90 was completed in 2011. The occasional traffic jams at this intersection prompted the sped-up construction of the ramps before the through lanes of SH 99 were built through the I-10/US 90 interchange. Two more ramps connecting southbound SH 99 to eastbound I-10/US 90 and westbound I-10/US 90 to northbound SH 99 opened as part of the construction of Segment E in December 2013. A final ramp connecting northbound SH 99 to westbound I-10/US 90 has been completed and is operational.

Between the Westpark Tollway and I-69/US 59, Fort Bend County has constructed toll overpasses at nine locations along SH 99. Overpasses between I-69/US 59 and US 90 Alternate opened on February 27, 2014, Airport Boulevard and Harlem Road on March 18, 2014, and Mason Road and Bellfort Street on March 30, 2014. The remainder of the tolled overpasses to I-10/US 90 opened in late April 2014. Motorists in 2-axle vehicles may pay between $0.46 and $0.69 to use each overpass, or they may bypass the toll by using the current roadway through the signalized intersections.

A TxDOT study is currently underway for Segment D. The study includes looking at ways to reduce traffic in the original segment of the non-tolled portion of the freeway; this includes the possibility of adding continuous frontage roads. This segment has been open since 1994 and population, and thus traffic, in the surrounding area has increased greatly since. There is no timetable on when or if any new projects will come out of this study.

=== Segment E ===
Segment E connects I-10/US 90 Katy Freeway in the south near Katy to US 290/SH 6 near Cypress. Construction began in summer 2011, and Segment E opened as scheduled in December 2013.

On June 3, 2008, the Harris County Commissioners Court voted to fast-track the construction of Segment E, with construction to begin in 2009. Despite the addition of $150 million in stimulus funding, the project stalled. As with many stimulus-funded projects, the construction of Segment E turned out not to be "shovel ready" enough, and the funds were sent back to TxDOT for use elsewhere. In 2011, the Wetlands permit from the Army Corps of Engineers was acquired. In addition, Harris County relinquished its rights to TxDOT so that the latter could construct a public–private cooperative toll road. At its meeting on April 28, 2011, TxDOT allocated $350 million, and the construction permits were let in July 2011. On July 28, 2011, TxDOT reported that three out of four contracts for Segment E were awarded and that construction would start by early September 2011.

The multi-year reconstruction of I-10/US 90 was completed in 2008, while US 290/SH 6 reconstruction was not scheduled to begin until 2011. The 22-mile (35 km) section of I-10/US 90 from Katy to just inside the I-610 loop was expanded to handle the rapidly-growing western suburbs with additional mainlanes and two high-occupancy toll lanes.

=== Segment F-1 ===
Segment F-1 connects US 290/SH 6 near Cypress to SH 249 near Tomball. Construction began in June 2013 and was completed and opened to traffic on February 5, 2016. In early 2020, construction commenced on four direct connectors: two from northbound Tomball Tollway to east and westbound Grand Parkway, and two connecting to southbound Tomball Tollway from east and westbound Grand Parkway. The project was completed in 2022.

=== Segment F-2 ===
Segment F-2 connects SH 249 near Tomball with I-45 near Spring. Construction began on Segment F-2 in June 2013. A one-mile section of frontage road lanes between I-45 and Holzwarth Road (near the ExxonMobil Campus in Spring) was completed and opened to traffic in April 2015. The remainder of Segment F-2 opened on February 5, 2016.

=== Segment G ===
Segment G connects I-45 near Spring with I-69/US 59 in New Caney. Construction began in June 2013 and was completed and opened to traffic on March 29, 2016. An interchange with the Hardy Toll Road was completed on July 18, 2016.

=== Segments H and I-1 ===
Segments H and I-1 extend from I-69/US 59 north of Houston to I-10. Texas Transportation Commission members met in Pasadena in late June 2015, and one item on their agenda is soliciting interested builders to develop, build and maintain the next 37.4 mi (60.2 km) Grand Parkway segment from I-69/US 59 north of Houston to I-10 east of the city. The project, which began construction in the summer of 2017, was expected to cost $1.2 billion. Due to Hurricane Harvey, the completion date was delayed from 2019 to May 2022, when it opened.

=== Segment I-2 ===
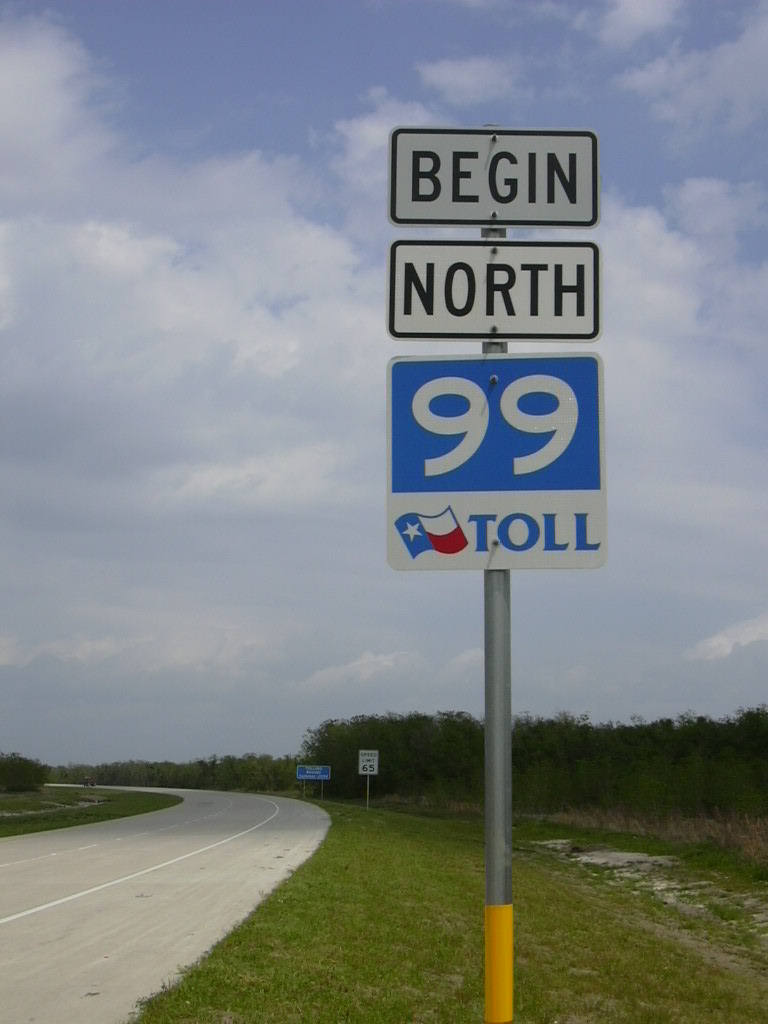
The southern end of the tolled portion of segment I-2

Segment I-2, which opened on March 25, 2008, after five years of construction, runs from I-10 east of Houston south to Business SH 146 in Baytown. (The former Spur 55, which ran from FM 1405 to Business 146, was renumbered SH 99 and connects with the newly constructed portion of Segment I-2 at FM 1405.) TxDOT began collecting tolls on this segment on November 1, 2011.

== Controversies ==
Residents who live along the Grand Parkway in Harris and Fort Bend counties, namely in the Cinco Ranch and Falcon Point areas within Segment D, noticed increased noise due to expansion of the highway, which includes construction of new overpasses as well as increased growth in the surrounding area. TxDOT began adding noise barriers along this area in 2023 while also beginning the process of widening the segment of road.

Some groups of residents oppose the idea of the Grand Parkway going through their neighborhoods. The group United to Save Our Spring tried to stop the Grand Parkway from going through a neighborhood off FM 2920. Residents in other unincorporated areas such as The Woodlands have not shown the same opposition, instead supporting the construction of the Grand Parkway, namely Segments E, F-1, F-2, and G, as the route would give residents living in the outer suburbs a toll road option for long-distance travel, as opposed to having to drive through the city of Houston or using the Sam Houston Tollway to bypass the city.

Some residents in Brazoria County, along Segment B, have voiced opposition to several of the proposed alignments. However, TxDOT has recently proposed a fifth alternative alignment to the north of Alvin. This alternative is acceptable to the opposition group Citizens Against the Grand Parkway and is likely to encounter much less opposition from the community.

The controversial Segment A, which would stretch from SH 146 to I-45 southeast of Houston through a very developed area, has not been fully designed yet. SH 146 is a possible routing of the highway in Segment A, but TxDOT has released plans for the highway to intersect I-45 from the west at its intersection with FM 646. If the highway were to continue south on SH 146 to its intersection with FM 646 (supposing that it is built along the route of FM 646), it would eventually have to pass through the town of Kemah, which could not support a large highway unless many businesses were destroyed.

== Exit list ==
SH 99 is proposed to be extended counterclockwiseward from I-69/US 59 in Sugar Land, to I-45 in League City.

County	Location	mi	km	Destinations	Notes
Galveston	Friendswood			I-45 / FM 646	future flyover interchange; road will continue as FM 646
Galveston	Friendswood			Calder Road	
Galveston	Friendswood			Landing Street	
Galveston	Friendswood			Bay Area Road	
Galveston	Friendswood			Maple Leaf Drive	
Brazoria	Alvin			SH 35 south	northern end of SH 35 concurrency
Brazoria	Alvin			Dickinson Road	
Brazoria	Alvin			SH 6	
Brazoria	Alvin			House Street	
Brazoria	Alvin			Fulton Drive / South Street	
Brazoria	Alvin			Fairway Drive	
Brazoria	Alvin			Mustang Street	
Brazoria	Alvin			FM 1462 / South Gordon Street	
Brazoria	Alvin			FM 2403	
Brazoria	Alvin			FM 2917 / CR 161	
Brazoria	Alvin			CR 192 north / Liverpool Spur	
Brazoria	Liverpool			SH 35 north	southern end of SH 35 concurrency
Brazoria				CR 511 (Russell Road)	
Brazoria				FM 1462	
Brazoria				Old School Road / CR 60	
Brazoria				SH 288	
Brazoria				CR 48	
Brazoria				FM 521	
Fort Bend				To Peters Road	
Fort Bend				FM 762	
Fort Bend				Fort Bend Parkway Toll Road north	Future southern terminus of Fort Bend Parkway Toll Road
Fort Bend				Reading Road / FM 762	
Fort Bend				FM 762 / FM 2759	
Fort Bend				Sansbury Boulevard	
Fort Bend				I-69 / US 59 – Victoria, Houston	northbound exit and southbound entrance in the future
Fort Bend	Sugar Land	0.0	0.0	I-69 / US 59 – Houston, Victoria	I-69/US 59 exit 104; access to I-69/US 59 via frontage roads; southbound exit and northbound entrance
Fort Bend	Sugar Land	0.7	1.1	Riverpark Drive	interchange; current south end of toll road
Fort Bend	Sugar Land			Riverpark Toll Plaza; Electronic toll tags only, cash and pay-by-mail not allowed	
Fort Bend	Sugar Land	2.2	3.5	New Territory Boulevard	
Fort Bend	Sugar Land			New Territory Toll Plaza; Electronic toll tags only, cash and pay-by-mail not allowed	
Fort Bend	Richmond	2.6– 3.2	4.2– 5.1	US 90 Alt. / FM 1464 / Sandhill Drive	
Fort Bend	Richmond			US 90 Alt. Toll Plaza; Electronic toll tags only, cash and pay-by-mail not allowed	
Fort Bend	Richmond			Harlem Toll Plaza; Electronic toll tags only, cash and pay-by-mail not allowed Gantry is located between Harlem Road and West Airport Boulevard	
Fort Bend	Richmond	5.9– 7.4	9.5– 11.9	West Airport Boulevard / Harlem Road	
Fort Bend	Richmond			West Bellfort Toll Plaza; Electronic toll tags only, cash and pay-by-mail not allowed Gantry is located between Mason Road and Bellfort Street	
Fort Bend	Richmond	8.5– 9.3	13.7– 15.0	Mason Road / Bellfort Street	
Fort Bend	Richmond			Peek Road Toll Plaza; Electronic toll tags only, cash and pay-by-mail not allowed	
Fort Bend	Richmond	10.9	17.5	Peek Road	Road not connected yet
Fort Bend	Richmond			Bellaire Toll Plaza; Electronic toll tags only, cash and pay-by-mail not allowed	
Fort Bend	Richmond	11.7	18.8	Bellaire Boulevard	
Fort Bend	Richmond	12.5	20.1	FM 1093 / Fort Bend Westpark Tollway	Last free southbound (counterclockwise) exit before start of FBCTRA's Grand Parkway Toll Road
Fort Bend	Richmond			Westpark Toll Plaza; Electronic toll tags only, cash and pay-by-mail not allowed Southbound gantry is located after the last free exit to FM 1093	
Fort Bend	Richmond	13.0	20.9	Fort Bend Westpark Tollway east	Direct Ramp to eastbound Fort Bend Westpark Tollway
Fort Bend	Richmond	13.2	21.2	Fry Road	
Fort Bend	Cinco Ranch	14.5	23.3	Westheimer Parkway	
Fort Bend	Cinco Ranch	15.3	24.6	Cinco Ranch Boulevard	
Harris	Katy	16.5	26.6	Bay Hill Boulevard / Highland Knolls Drive	
Harris	Katy	17.3	27.8	Kingsland Boulevard	No northbound exit (closed until December 2024); northbound access is via Bay Hill Boulevard / Highland Knolls Drive exit
Harris	Katy	17.7	28.5	SH 99 north (Frontage Road)	Northbound (clockwise) exit and southbound (counterclockwise) entrance, access to Memorial Hermann Katy Hospital; last free exit for northbound (clockwise) SH 99 traffic
Harris	Katy	17.8	28.6	I-10 (US 90) – San Antonio, Houston	Last free northbound (clockwise) exit before start of toll road
Harris	Katy			Franz Road / Colonial Parkway / I-10 Frontage Road	
Harris	Katy			Morton Ranch Road	
Harris	Katy			Clay Road	
Harris	Katy			Spencer Mainlane Toll Plaza; Electronic toll tags or pay-by-mail (cash not accepted)	
Harris	Cypress			FM 529	
Harris	Cypress			West Road	
Harris	Cypress			Tuckerton Road	
Harris	Cypress			Bridgeland Creek Parkway	
Harris	Cypress			North Bridgeland Lake Parkway	
Harris	Cypress			Northwest Mainlane Toll Plaza; Electronic toll tags or pay-by-mail (cash not accepted); Northbound gantry is near Jack Road and southbound gantry is near North Bridgeland Lake Parkway	
Harris	Cypress			Jack Road	Formerly Louetta Road
Harris	Cypress			US 290 (SH 6) – Austin, Houston	
Harris	Cypress			Mason Mainlane Toll Plaza; Electronic toll tags or pay-by-mail (cash not accepted)	
Harris	Cypress			Cumberland Ridge Drive / Cypresswood Drive	Cypresswood Drive not signed northbound
Harris	Tomball			Mueschke Road	
Harris	Tomball			Cypress Rosehill Road	
Harris	Tomball			Telge Road	
Harris	Tomball			SH 249 Mainlane Toll Plaza; Electronic toll tags or pay-by-mail (cash not accepted)	
Harris	Tomball			SH 249 to Tomball Tollway north / Frontage Road / Boudreaux Road / Rocky Road	Access to northbound Tomball Tollway via frontage roads.
Harris	Tomball			Tomball Tollway south – Houston	Eastbound and westbound direct ramps to Tomball Tollway south.
Harris	Tomball			Gleannloch Forest Drive / Champion Forest Drive	
Harris	Tomball			Champions Forest Mainlane Toll Plaza; Electronic toll tags or pay-by-mail (cash not accepted)	
Harris	Tomball			FM 2920 / Spring Stuebner Road – Tomball, Hooks Airport	Spring Stuebner Road not signed
Harris	Spring			Kuykendahl Road / Spring Stuebner Road	
Harris	Spring			Gosling Road	
Harris	Spring			Mossy Oaks Mainlane Toll Plaza; Electronic toll tags or pay-by-mail (cash not accepted)	
Harris	Spring			Springwoods Village Parkway / Holzwarth Road	Access to St. Luke's Health - Springwoods Village Hospital
Harris	Spring			To I-45 south – Houston, George Bush Intercontinental Airport	Access to I-45 southbound via frontage roads
Harris	Spring			I-45 north – Dallas	Direct ramp to I-45 northbound
Harris	Spring			Hardy Mainlane Toll Plaza; Electronic toll tags or pay-by-mail (cash not accepted)	
Harris	Spring			Hardy Toll Road south	No exit to northbound Hardy Toll Road.
Montgomery	Spring			Riley Fuzzel Mainlane Toll Plaza; Electronic toll tags or pay-by-mail (cash not accepted)	
Montgomery	Spring			Rayford Road	Eastbound exit and westbound entrance
Montgomery	Spring			Riley Fuzzel Road	Westbound exit and eastbound entrance
Montgomery	Spring			Birnham Woods Drive / Rayford Road	Rayford Road not signed eastbound
Montgomery	Spring			Townsen Boulevard / Imperial Promenade Drive	Townsen Boulevard not connected yet
Montgomery	Porter			Highlands Parkway	Formerly Riverwalk Drive
Montgomery	Porter			FM 1314 – Porter, Conroe	
Montgomery	Porter			Valley Ranch Mainlane Toll Plaza; Electronic toll tags or pay-by-mail (cash not accepted)	
Montgomery	Porter			I-69 / US 59 / Loop 494 / Community Drive / Valley Ranch Boulevard – Houston, Cleveland	I-69/US 59 exits 157A-B northbound; eastbound exit and westbound entrance; access to I-69 and Loop 494 via frontage roads; US 59 does not appear on exit signage
Montgomery	New Caney			I-69 / US 59 – Cleveland, Houston	Direct Ramp to I-69/US 59, exit 157 southbound; US 59 does not appear on exit signage
Montgomery	New Caney			FM 1485 Mainlane Toll Plaza; Electronic toll tags or pay-by-mail (cash not accepted)	
Montgomery	New Caney			FM 1485 / Wilderness Road	Eastbound exit and westbound entrance
Montgomery	New Caney			Galaxy Boulevard	Road not connected yet
Harris	New Caney			Huffman-Cleveland Road	
Liberty	New Caney			Miller Wilson Road	
Liberty				Community Drive	
Liberty				Wolf Trot Mainlane Toll Plaza; Electronic toll tags or pay-by-mail (cash not accepted)	
Liberty				Wolf Trot Road	Road not connected yet
Liberty				Kingwood Drive	Road not connected yet
Liberty				FM 686	
Liberty				FM 1960 – Dayton, Humble	
Liberty				US 90 – Houston, Liberty	
Liberty				FM 1413	
Liberty				SH 146 Mainlane Toll Plaza; Electronic toll tags or pay-by-mail (no cash accepted)	
Chambers				SH 146 – Mont Belvieu, Dayton	
Chambers				FM 565 – Mont Belvieu	
Chambers				I-10 / Langston Drive / Old Needlepoint Road – Houston, Beaumont	Access to I-10 via frontage roads
Chambers				Kilgore Parkway	
Chambers				FM 565 / FM 2354 – Cove, Beach City	
Chambers				Cotton Lake Mainlane Toll Plaza; Electronic toll tags or pay-by-mail (cash not accepted)	
Chambers				Turnaround	
Chambers				Cedar Port Parkway	
Chambers				FM 1405	
Chambers				FM 1405 Mainlane Toll Plaza; Electronic toll tags or pay-by-mail (cash not accepted)	
Harris	Baytown			Bus. SH 146, Tri Cities Beach Road, ML Wisner Drive	
Harris	Baytown			SH 146 Business Mainlane Toll Plaza; Electronic toll tags or pay-by-mail (cash not accepted)	
Harris	Baytown			Lee Drive / Causeway Road	Eastbound exit and westbound entrance; last free eastbound (counterclockwise) exit before start of toll road
Harris	Baytown			To SH 146 north, Wyoming Drive	
Harris	Baytown			SH 146 south – La Porte	future north end of SH 146 overlap
1.000 mi = 1.609 km; 1.000 km = 0.621 mi: Concurrency terminus; Incomplete access; Tolled; Unopened
