= North Texas Tollway Authority =

Toll road operating company

- Logo

Authority overview
- Formed: 1997
- Preceding authority: Texas Turnpike Authority (TTA)
- Jurisdiction: Collin, Dallas, Denton, Tarrant, and Johnson counties, Texas
- Headquarters: 5900 West Plano Parkway Suite 100, Plano, Texas
- Authority executive: James Hofmann, CEO & Executive Director
- Website: ntta.org

The North Texas Tollway Authority (NTTA) is a not-for-profit government organization that maintains and operates toll roads, bridges, and tunnels in the North Texas area. Functioning as a political subdivision of the State of Texas under Chapter 366 of the Transportation Code, the NTTA is empowered to acquire, construct, maintain, repair and operate turnpike projects; to raise capital for construction projects through the issuance of turnpike revenue bonds; and to collect tolls to operate, maintain and pay debt service on those projects.

The NTTA is governed by a nine-member board of directors, two appointed by each of the four counties in its service area: Collin County, Dallas County, Denton County and Tarrant County as well as one appointed by the Texas Governor. North Texas Tollway Authority is a non-profit entity, and performs many of the same functions as the Texas Department of Transportation, but is limited solely to facilities that it operates for revenue.

== Board of directors ==
There are nine members of the NTTA Board of Directors. Eight members are appointed by four counties, two per county. The ninth member is appointed by the governor. Of these members, one is elected to serve as board chairman, and another is elected to serve as vice chairman.

Members as of 2026
Board member	Position	Represented county
Scott Levine	Chairman	Collin County
Mojy Haddad	Vice Chairman	Tarrant County
Justin Hewlett	Director	Governor's appointee
Derek Baker	Director	Collin County
John Mahalik	Director	Denton County
Pete Kamp	Director	Denton County
Marcus Knight	Director	Dallas County
Andy Wambsganss	Director	Tarrant County
George Quesada	Director	Dallas County

== Current roadways ==
=== Tollways ===
- Dallas North Tollway
- President George Bush Turnpike
- Sam Rayburn Tollway
- Chisholm Trail Parkway
- 360 Tollway

=== Bridges and tunnels ===
- Addison Airport Toll Tunnel
- Lewisville Lake Toll Bridge
- Mountain Creek Lake Bridge

== Planned roadways or expansions ==
- Dallas North Tollway: northern extension to just north of the Grayson County line.
- 360 Tollway: Southern Extension to the western part of Venus and end at US-67 on the Northern Border Line of Venus. The project is currently in its planning stage.
- President George Bush Turnpike: A Southern Extension will be made down to Interstate 20 ending in Mesquite in order to complete the loop around Dallas County. The project is currently in its planning stage.

== Former or cancelled roadways ==
- Dallas–Fort Worth Turnpike
- Jesse Jones Memorial Bridge
- Trinity Parkway: cancelled in 2017

== History ==
=== Texas Turnpike Authority history ===
Original signage for Dallas-Fort Worth Turnpike

The Texas Turnpike Authority (TTA) began construction on the state's first toll road, the Dallas–Fort Worth Turnpike, in 1955 and opened the road in 1957. Original plans were for the bonds on the Turnpike to be retired in 1995; however, the bonds were retired in 1977 (17 years ahead of schedule) and tolls were then removed from the road, which the next year was officially designated as Interstate 30 (I-30).

Construction began on NTTA's oldest existing toll road, the Dallas North Tollway, in 1966, and its first segment (from I-35E to I-635) was opened in 1968. The Tollway (as it is popularly known) has (along with general Dallas-area growth) expanded continually northward, opening extensions in 1987, 1994, and most recently in 2007.

TTA started construction in 1977 on its first toll bridge, the 2.5-mile (4.0 km) Mountain Creek Lake Bridge, which opened in 1979. The bridge spans Mountain Creek Lake in the southwestern Dallas County city of Grand Prairie.

Construction was started on TTA's only project outside the area, the 2.0-mile (3.2 km) Jesse Jones Memorial Bridge across the Houston Ship Channel, in 1979, with the bridge opening in 1982. TTA sold the bridge to the newly created Harris County Toll Road Authority in 1994, leaving all of TTA's assets in the area in which NTTA was later established.

=== NTTA establishment ===
The North Texas Tollway Authority (NTTA) was established in 1997 by Texas Senate Bill 370. The legislation abolished the TTA, which was an independent state agency, and established the Texas Turnpike Authority division of the Texas Department of Transportation. The bill established the NTTA and made it the successor agency to TTA, assuming the prior agencies assets and liabilities. The bill authorized the establishment of other regional tollway authorities and established the laws by which they are governed.

== TollTag ==
TollTag logo

TollTag is the electronic toll collection system used by the NTTA in the Dallas / Fort Worth metro area. It was the first electronic toll collection system in the United States when it was installed on the Dallas North Tollway in 1989. There are currently over 4 million TollTags in operation in the North Texas area. The NTTA offers reduced toll rates for TollTag users at all toll points.

TollTags can be used on all of the roadways of the NTTA, and they can also be used on any other toll road in the state of Texas as well as for some parking lots in downtown Dallas for parking or toll payment at the Dallas/Fort Worth International Airport (DFW), and at Dallas Love Field Airport (DAL). Current TollTags are small stickers with tiny chips in the middle, similar to those used for state inspections and auto registrations but cannot be moved between vehicles. The previous TollTag was a hard case tag which was affixed to the windshield using velcro tags; these tags have since been removed from service and replaced with the current version.

=== Interoperability ===
1. 2003 - Texas Department of Transportation (TxTag), Harris County Toll Road Authority and Fort Bend County Toll Road Authority (EZ Tag).
2. August 10, 2014 - Oklahoma Turnpike Authority (Pike Pass).
3. May 17, 2017 - Kansas Turnpike Authority (K-TAG).
4. 2023 - Florida's SunPass
5. June 2, 2024 - Colorado's ExpressToll
6. TBA - Transportation Corridor Agencies (via FasTrak) in Orange County, California
7. TBA - E-ZPass

== Criticism ==
In August 2010, the NTTA faced criticism by replacing the only minority member of the board—making the nine-member board all white and all male.

A multi-year audit released in October 2011 stated that the NTTA had inappropriate discussions with consultants while they were in the midst of bidding on lucrative Tollway contracts, as well as not having a firmly defined code of corporate ethics.

== The FBI raid of 2011 ==
Various DFW news outlets first started reporting that the North Texas Tollway Authority (NTTA) had been raided by Federal Bureau of Investigation (FBI) officials in late October 2011. NBC 5 DFW (KXAS-TV) first reported this story on October 22, 2011, that "FBI Questioned NTTA Officials". Four years after that article was published, January 13, 2015, the NTTA finally released a nine-page PDF document entitled 'NTTA RUMORS Q&A' where the authority explained what exactly happened. According to the published memo:

"Beginning in October 2011, the Federal Bureau of Investigation (the "FBI") interviewed several officials of the Authority regarding any knowledge the officials may have concerning the conduct of certain current and former Board members, including possible conflicts of interests pertaining to Authority business. The Authority has no reason to believe that it is the target of the investigation or that the investigation will materially adversely affect the operations or financial condition of the Authority or the transactions contemplated by the Resolution, the Trust Agreement and this Official Statement, or would adversely affect the validity or enforceability of the Resolution, the Trust Agreement or the Series 2014 Bonds. The investigation is ongoing and the Authority is cooperating fully with the FBI. There can be no assurance that the investigation will be limited to the matters described above or that the Authority will not become a target at a later date."

Following this memo, neither any current or former board members were charged and the result, and or findings, of the FBI 'raid' are still currently unknown.

== See also ==
- EZ TAG
- E-ZPass used in 14 states, mostly in the East and Midwest, as well as in Ontario
- Fastrak used in California
- GeauxPass used in Louisiana
- I-Pass used in Illinois
- K-Tag used in Kansas
- NationalPass provides interoperability with TransCore systems outside of Texas
- Peach Pass used in Georgia
- Pikepass used in Oklahoma
- Sunpass used in Florida
- TxTag
- Texas tollways
