= Hardy Toll Road =

Toll road in Texas, United States

Hardy Toll Road
- Hardy Toll Road highlighted in red; Hardy Toll Road Airport Connector in blue

Route information
- Maintained by Harris County Toll Road Authority
- Length: 21.9 mi (35.2 km)
- Existed: 1988–present

Major junctions
- South end: I-610 in Houston
- Beltway 8 at Aldine; SH 99 Toll at Spring
- North end: I-45 at Spring

Location
- Country: United States
- State: Texas
- Counties: Harris

Highway system
- Highways in Texas; Interstate; US; State; Former; Toll; Loops; Spurs; FM/RM; Park; Rec
← Loop 547	Spur 548	→ Loop 549

The Hardy Toll Road is a controlled-access toll road in the Greater Houston area of the U.S. state of Texas, maintained by the Harris County Toll Road Authority. The route runs from Interstate 610 near central Houston to Interstate 45 just south of the Harris–Montgomery county line. The road generally parallels Interstate 45. The portion from I-610 to Crosstimbers Road was designated on September 26, 1984 as Spur 548, although this is unsigned.

Construction on the toll road started in September 1984 and the entire road was complete by June 1988. The toll road runs 21.6 miles (34.8 km) and costs $3 to drive its full length ($1.50 north of Beltway 8 and $1.50 south of Beltway 8). A four-mile (6 km) connecting road to the George Bush Intercontinental Airport requires a $1.20 toll. As of July 18, 2016, the Hardy Toll Road discontinued cash tolling and made the switch to all-electronic tolling. All drivers must now use an EZ TAG to access the toll road.

The road is named for nearby Hardy Street, which makes up the frontage roads for the toll road in two locations: between Spring Railroad Yard and FM 1960, and between Greens Road and Crosstimbers Road.

A large portion of the southern segment resembles Austin's Mopac Expressway in that an active line of the Union Pacific railroad runs along its median. Like other toll roads in the Houston area, the speed limit is 65 mph (105 km/h), even inside Beltway 8.

== Planned extensions ==
=== Southward ===
Future plans are to extend the toll road south an additional four miles (6 km) into downtown Houston (the northernmost mile marker is 25, though the current road is only 21.9 miles (35.2 km) long). In November 2007 the city of Houston gave approval for street closures required to construct the connections to the downtown freeway loop. Originally, construction was scheduled to start in August 2009 with completion sometime in 2011; however, this has been delayed. It is expected that the toll road will deviate from Hardy Street south of I-610 and follow Maury Street to connect with the Eastex Freeway near I-10, as part of the ramp connections have already been built.

Construction on the Hardy Toll Road Downtown connector began in 2014.

=== Northward ===
Hardy Toll Road exit sign on I-45 NB

Because the population of Montgomery County experienced quick growth, the need for a northward extension was evaluated. Originally, the plan was to construct the extension along the right-of-way for the railroad. However, recent growth in Oak Ridge North requires that the Hardy Toll Road extension deviate from this right-of-way in places. Feasibility studies have evaluated possible routes between FM 1314 and the San Jacinto River, with the northern terminus planned to be at Loop 336. As of 2003 no plans for construction had been formulated.

== Lane count ==
The following are the number of mainlanes in each direction, as of May 2017:

- 4 lanes each way between Interstate 610 and Crosstimbers Road (these lanes are the unsigned Spur 548)
- 3 lanes each way between Crosstimbers Road and Grand Parkway (SH 99 Toll)
- 2 lanes each way between Grand Parkway and Interstate 45 (northern terminus)

== Exit list ==
The entire route is in Harris County. All exits are unnumbered.

Location	mi	km	Destinations	Notes
Houston	0.0	0.0	I-610	I-610 exit 19B; southbound exit and northbound entrance
Houston	0.0	0.0	Hardy Street / Elysian Street	Southbound exit and northbound entrance
Houston	0.5	0.80	Crosstimbers Road	Last free exit before toll road begins
Houston			Hardy Toll Road begins	Northern terminus of the unsigned Spur 548; southern terminus of HCTRA maintenance
Houston	1.7	2.7	Tidwell Road, Parker Road	
Houston	3.3	5.3	Little York Road, Gulf Bank Road	
Aldine	5.5	8.9	FM 525 (Aldine Bender Road) / Aldine Mail Route, Gulf Bank Road	FM 525 does not appear on exit signage
Aldine	7.9	12.7	Hardy South EZTAG Plaza; Electronic toll tags only, no cash allowed	
Aldine	8.4	13.5	Beltway 8 (Sam Houston Parkway)	Access to Sam Houston Parkway main lanes via Frontage Road
Houston	9.8	15.8	Intercontinental Airport / Central Green Boulevard	Hardy Connector to George Bush Intercontinental Airport; Central Green Boulevard not signed southbound
	10.0	16.1	Rankin Road	
Houston	12.9	20.8	Richey Road	Access to Lone Star College–North Harris campus
Westfield	15.1	24.3	FM 1960	
Spring	17.6	28.3	Hardy North EZTAG Plaza; Electronic toll tags only, no cash allowed	
Spring	18.4	29.6	Louetta Road, Aldine–Westfield Road	Northbound exit and southbound entrance
Spring	19.6	31.5	Riley Fuzzel Road	Northbound exit and southbound entrance
Spring	19.9	32.0	SH 99 Toll (Grand Parkway)	Northbound exit and southbound entrance
Spring	21.1	34.0	Northgate Crossing Boulevard / Springwoods Village Parkway	Northbound exit & southbound entrance
Spring	21.9	35.2	I-45 north	I-45 exit 72 northbound, 72B southbound; northbound exit & southbound entrance
1.000 mi = 1.609 km; 1.000 km = 0.621 mi: Incomplete access; Tolled; Route transition

=== Airport connector ===
The entire route is in Houston, Harris County.

mi	km	Destinations	Notes
0.0	0.0	Hardy Toll Road – Houston, Woodlands	Westbound exit and eastbound entrance
0.5	0.80	Central Green Boulevard	Westbound exit and eastbound entrance
0.9	1.4	Toll gantry for both directions Electronic toll tags only, no cash allowed	
1.1	1.8	Waverly Drive, Aldine Westfield Road	Eastbound exit and westbound entrance
3.4	5.5	John F. Kennedy Boulevard north – Intercontinental Airport	Eastbound exit and westbound entrance
1.000 mi = 1.609 km; 1.000 km = 0.621 mi: Electronic toll collection; Incomplete access
