= Montgomery County Toll Road Authority =

Authority overview
- Formed: November 2005 as MCTP, August 2006 as MCTRA
- Jurisdiction: Montgomery County, Texas
- Headquarters: Montgomery County Commissioners Court
- Website: MCTRA

The Montgomery County Toll Road Authority (MCTRA), formerly the Montgomery County Transportation Program (MCTP), is a government agency created on August 24, 2006 by Montgomery County to oversee all future toll road projects within the county. MCTRA operates one toll road: the MCTRA 249 Tollway, which serves as the tolled mainlines of SH 249 (Tomball Parkway). This toll projects are located inside of Montgomery County, in the U.S. state of Texas.

== History ==
In 2005, Montgomery County created the Montgomery County Transportation Program (MCTP) to oversee various pass through toll, called a shadow toll in other countries, financing projects for the state of Texas, located within Montgomery County.

On August 24, 2006, Montgomery County created the Montgomery County Toll Road Authority (MCTRA) to oversee all future toll road projects, located within Montgomery County.

When the MCTRA began collecting tolls from the tolling facilities, it used the EZ TAG system along with the two Texas interoperable tags used in the state; Texas Department of Transportation's TxTag and the North Texas Tollway Authority's TollTag as well as any other state tags that Texas becomes interoperable with.

== Roadway system ==
=== Roads built by the MCTP ===
Name	Starting location	Ending location
FM 1314 (Note: These are pass through financing projects (shadow toll), where the state of Texas is repaying Montgomery County back over time based on number of vehicles that travel these sections of the road each year.)	Fatheree Drive	1 mile (1.6 km) south of SH 242
FM 1484	FM 3083	FM 2432
FM 1485	Loop 494	Kidd Cemetery Road
FM 1488	I-45	FM 2978
FM 1488	FM 2978	Mostyn Road
Direct connector (Note: These direct connectors were built by the MCTP and were operated by the MCTRA (with HCTRA collecting tolls for MCTRA) from 2015 to 2019.)	SH 242 W	I-45 S
Direct connector	I-45 N	SH 242 W

=== Roads operated by the MCTRA ===
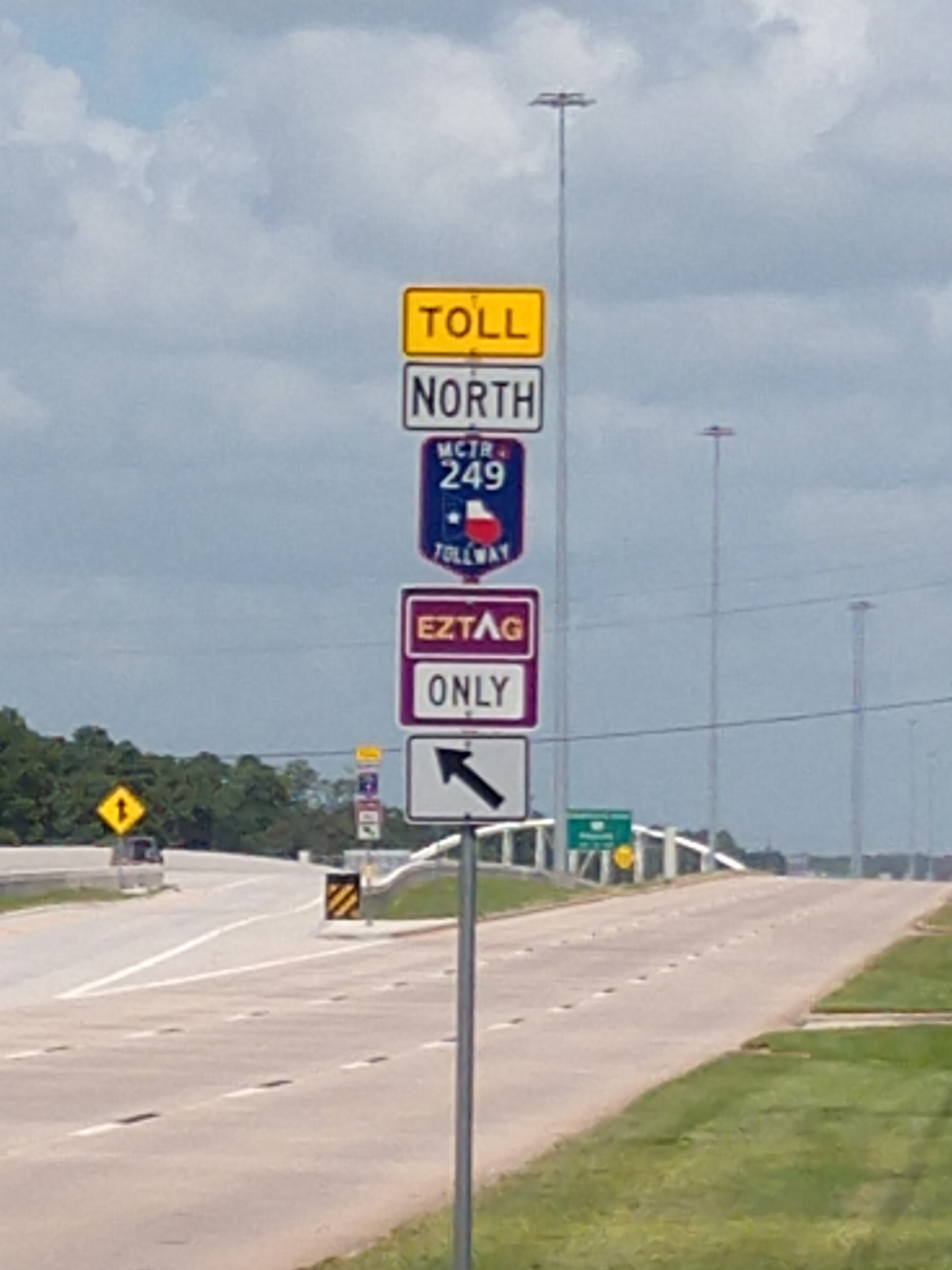
Toll road entrance to MCTRA 249 Tollway northbound

Number	Length (mi)	Length (km)	Southern or western terminus	Northern or eastern terminus	Formed	Removed	Notes
SH 242 Toll	.14	0.23	0.1 miles (0.16 km) west of I-45	0.1 miles (0.16 km) south of SH 242	2015	2019	One-way direct connector exit ramp from I-45 northbound onto SH 242 westbound. Opened on May 11, 2015; toll collection began on July 6, 2015. The Harris County Toll Road Authority (HCTRA) was the collecting agency for the MCTRA. The tolls were removed on May 28, 2019.
SH 249 Toll	3.2	5.1	Harris County line at Spring Creek	Woodtrace Boulevard in Pinehurst	2019	current	Signed as MCTRA 249 Tollway. The southern continuation of the toll road into Harris County is Tomball Tollway (maintained by HCTRA) to Spring Cypress Road; SH 249 continues as a freeway down to Beltway 8/Sam Houston Tollway, then as a surface road down to Interstate 45 in Houston. Toll road (as of October 28, 2022) continues as the Aggie Expressway (maintained by TxDOT) from FM 1774 in Pinehurst to SH 105 near Navasota in Grimes County. The segment north of FM 1774 near Todd Mission is a two-lane freeway without tolls.

Other toll facilities within Montgomery County are maintained by TxDOT and fall outside MCTRA's jurisdiction, including the Grand Parkway (SH 99 Toll) and the Aggie Expressway portion of SH 249 north of FM 1774 in Pinehurst.
