= Texas State Highway 249 =

Highway in Texas

State Highway 249
- SH 249, highlighted in red

Route information
- Maintained by TxDOT, HCTRA, and MCTRA
- Length: 49.443 mi (79.571 km)
- Existed: 1988–present

Major junctions
- South end: I-45 in Houston
- Beltway 8 / Sam Houston Tollway in Houston; SH 99 Toll in Tomball; FM 2920 in Tomball; FM 1488 east of Magnolia; FM 1774 north of Todd Mission
- North end: SH 105 near Navasota

Location
- Country: United States
- State: Texas
- Counties: Harris, Montgomery, Grimes

Highway system
- Highways in Texas; Interstate; US; State; Former; Toll; Loops; Spurs; FM/RM; Park; Rec
← SH 248	→ SH 250

State Highway 249 (SH 249), also known depending on its location as West Mount Houston Road, the Tomball Parkway, Tomball Tollway, MCTRA 249 Tollway, or the Aggie Expressway, is a 49.443-mile (79.571 km) generally north–south highway in Southeast Texas. The southern terminus is in North Houston at Interstate 45 (I-45). The current northern terminus of the highway is east of Navasota at SH 105.

== Route description ==
=== West Mount Houston Road section ===
The section of SH 249 along the east–west section between I-45 and West Montgomery is called West Mount Houston Road, a local arterial road. West Mount Houston Road, however, actually extends east past the intersection of SH 249 at I-45 to an intersection with Airline Drive.

=== Tomball Parkway section ===
The section of SH 249 between West Montgomery Road and Spring Cypress Road is called Tomball Parkway. South of its intersection with Hollister Road, Tomball Parkway is a local arterial road, whereas north of it, it becomes a non-tolled freeway until it reaches Northpointe Boulevard, where the Tomball Tollway begins.

=== Tomball Tollway section ===
==== Phase I ====
Tomball Tollway shield

Phase one runs for 6 miles (9.7 km) from just north of Spring Cypress Road, the current terminus of the existing free lanes to just north of the existing Tomball bypass. The Tomball Tollway is three lanes in each direction that are used to bypass seven stoplights and will only accept electronic toll-tags (EZ Tag, TollTag and TxTag) as no cash payments will be allowed; the total cost of the toll for HCTRA's segment is $1.50 for two-axle vehicles, while the SH 249 frontage roads will remain free to all drivers. Construction of phase one began in fall 2013 and was completed on April 12, 2015.

==== Business Route and Tomball Bypass ====
Business State Highway 249-B
- Location: Harris County
- Length: 2.3 mi (3.7 km)
- Existed: September 25, 2003–present

In 1999, a bypass around the central business district of Tomball was proposed that would reroute SH 249 along the west side of the city, this would allow commercial and thru traffic to avoid the downtown and hopefully alleviate traffic. The alignment of SH 249 from Hicks Road to Holderreith Road that went through the city proper was re-designated as SH 249 Business-B on September 25, 2003. Construction of the bypass was delayed many times, but eventually began in 2005 and was completed in 2008. This bypass was eventually incorporated into Phase I of the Tomball Tollway as the free to use frontage roads running alongside the tolled main lanes, as well as the future tolled overpass over FM 2920 which allowed traffic to bypass the light at 249 and 2920. This overpass would not be tolled for several years.

==== Phase II ====
Phase two extends the tollway into Montgomery County from Business SH 249-B to Sentinel Oaks in Montgomery County north of Spring Creek. This $335 million project was overseen by the Harris and Montgomery County toll road authorities. Construction on Phase 2 commenced in fall 2016 and was opened to traffic on December 19, 2019.

=== MCTRA 249 Tollway section ===
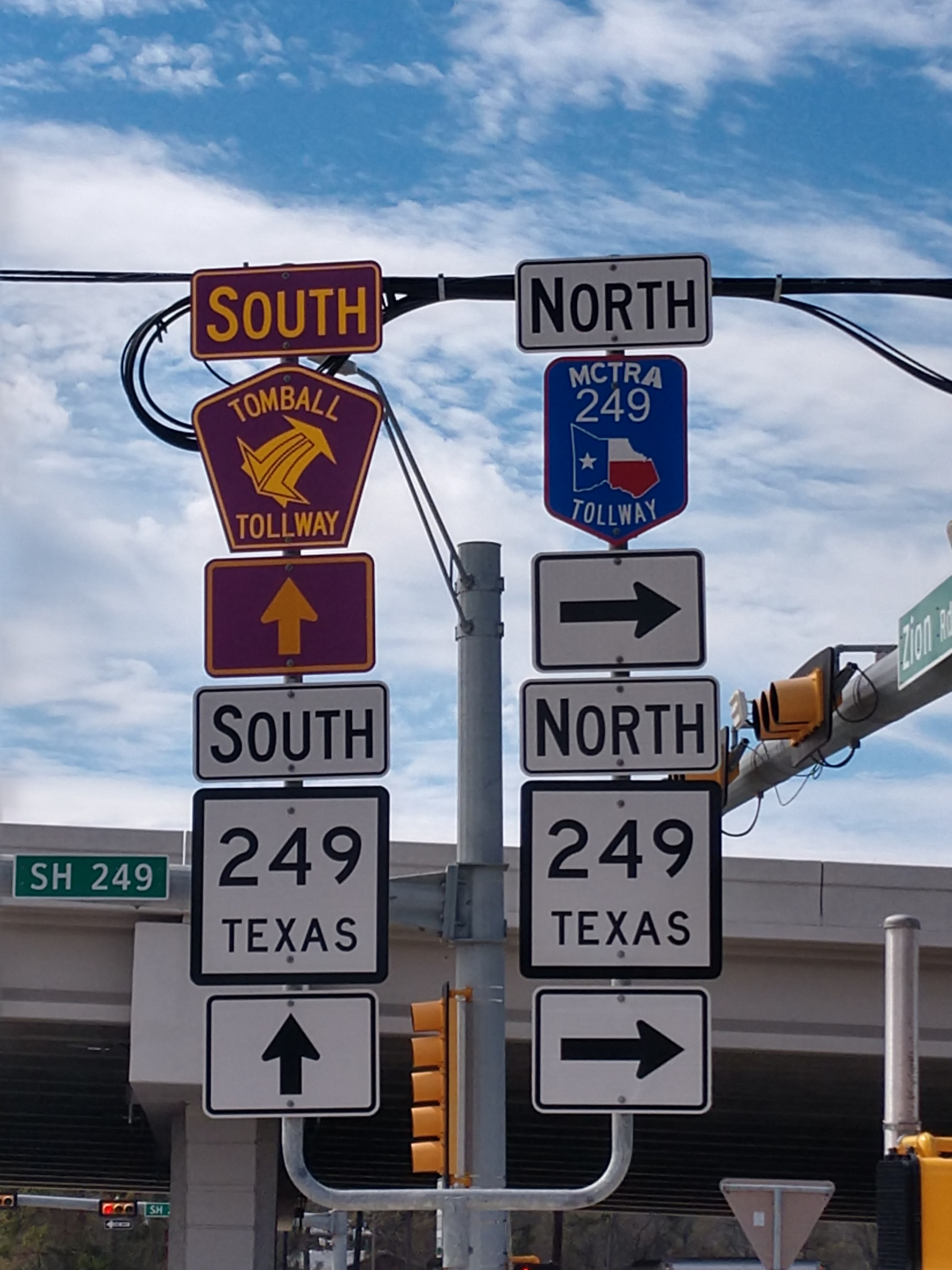
Westbound Zion Road at SH 249. Tomball Tollway is maintained by HCTRA, while the 249 Tollway is maintained by MCTRA. SH 249 is signed only on the frontage roads.

From Spring Creek to FM 1774 in Pinehurst, the tolled mainlanes of SH 249 will be maintained by the Montgomery County Toll Road Authority. Signed as MCTRA 249 Tollway, the first section to open was between Spring Creek and Sentinel Oaks (coinciding with Phase two of the HCTRA segment) on December 19, 2019. Construction on the next segment of MCTRA 249 Tollway from Sentinel Oaks to FM 1774 commenced in spring 2018. The next section of MCTRA 249 Tollway opened from Sentinel Oaks to Woodtrace Boulevard on March 26, 2020. The remaining MCTRA segment connecting to the TxDOT maintained section north of Woodtrace Boulevard opened on August 8, 2020. The total cost of the toll for MCTRA's segment is $1.47 for two-axle vehicles and, like HCTRA's Tomball Tollway, will only accept electronic toll-tags (EZ Tag, TollTag and TxTag).

=== Aggie Expressway section ===
From FM 1774 in Pinehurst to FM 1488 east of Magnolia, the toll road continues as SH 249 Toll, also known as the Aggie Expressway. The tolled main lanes are maintained by TxDOT and were opened on August 8, 2020, with no tolls charged until December 2020. The cost to drive segment 1A is $1.95; however, unlike the HCTRA and MCTRA sections of the toll road, TxDOT allows a pay-by-mail option for all users, though at a higher cost per toll.

Sign on entrance of the Aggie Expressway stating the payments and stating No Cash and No Permit Loads.

Another eight miles of the Aggie Expressway from FM 1488 up to FM 1774 north Todd Mission opened to traffic on March 26, 2021. The current cost to drive segment 1B is $2.54 for two-axle vehicles, which took effect on the day of opening.

The final segment of the Aggie Expressway began construction in late 2018 and was opened to all traffic on October 28, 2022. It is 2 untolled lanes with intermittent passing lanes that stretches from FM 1774 near Todd Mission to SH 105 east of Navasota.

== History ==
Originally a part of FM 149, the highway was given the designation of SH 249 in 1988. Previously, SH 249 was designated on June 22, 1937 from then-SH 73 (now Interstate 10) near San Felipe north to the Brazos River. The route was redesignated on May 9, 1940, as Spur 99. The route became part of Farm to Market Road 1458 on January 20, 1966.

The highway's importance grew after Compaq, a former information technology company, chose to locate its headquarters near at the intersection of SH 249 and Louetta Rd in Harris County in the 1980s. The company became so important to Houston that it necessitated the expansion of SH 249 in the late 1980s, and many other technology companies appeared in what became known as the "249 Corridor".

In 2015, SH 249 was extended northwest 24.4 miles from FM 149 and FM 1774 to SH 105 near Stoneham. A section of SH 249 from Woodtrace Boulevard to FM 149 was renumbered as a southern extension of FM 1774 in December 2019. On June 25, 2020, the FM 1774 extension was modified so that it extended only over the frontage roads of SH 249 from FM 149 to Woodtrace Boulevard while the main lanes from Woodtrace Boulevard to FM 1774 and on to SH 105 retained the SH 249 designation. On August 8, 2020, the section of SH 249 from FM 1774 to FM 1488 was opened. On March 26, 2021, the section of SH 249 from FM 1488 to FM 1774 was opened.

Since the designation of SH 249, TxDOT had long-term plans to extend the highway to Grimes County. Continued growth in the Bryan/College Station, Conroe and northwest Houston regions have congested existing roadways, including SH 105 and FM 1774. Texas A&M University and businesses in the Bryan/College Station area would benefit from faster connections to Bush-Intercontinental Airport, the Port of Houston and the Texas Medical Center. A bypass of Magnolia was desirable because of the large traffic load every October due to the annual Texas Renaissance Festival. Decreased funding for road projects in recent years had stalled the extension of SH 249. However the rapid growth in the area has led to a renewed push in 2012 to build further segments.

Plans for the middle segments (Pinehurst–Todd Mission) and north segment (Todd Mission–Navasota) were revived by TXDOT in early 2013. TxDOT has formed a working group with local officials and stakeholders to discuss alternatives for the SH 249 corridor. The segment from Sentinel Oaks to FM 1774 in Pinehurst (maintained by MCTRA) opened in spring 2020. From FM 1774 in Pinehurst, north up to SH 105 in Grimes County, SH 249 was under the jurisdiction of TxDOT. The remaining portion of SH 249 in Montgomery County from FM 1488 to FM 1774 in Todd Mission was completed on March 26, 2021. In Grimes County, the north segment was constructed as a non-tolled two-lane freeway. Construction in Grimes County began in late 2018 and was completed in October 2022.

== Major intersections ==
All exits are unnumbered.

County	Location	mi	km	Destinations	Notes
Harris	Houston	0.00	0.00	West Mount Houston Road	Continuation east of I-45
Harris	Houston	1.45	2.33	I-45 (North Freeway)	Southern terminus of SH 249; I-45 exit 57B
Harris	Houston	2.90	4.67	Beltway 8 (Frontage Road) / Sam Houston Tollway	interchange; south end of freeway; southbound traffic has two direct ramps to westbound and eastbound Sam Houston Tollway
Harris	Houston	4.36	7.02	Greens Road / Gessner Road	
Harris	Houston	5.81	9.35	FM 1960 / Gessner Road	Access to Methodist Hospital Willowbrook
Harris	Houston	7.27	11.70	Grant Road / Schroeder Road / Perry Road	
Harris	Houston	8.72	14.03	Cypresswood Drive / Compaq Center Drive	
Harris	Houston	10.17	16.37	Chasewood Park Drive / Compaq Center Drive / Cypresswood Drive / Perry Road	Access to CHI St. Luke's Health - The Vintage Hospital
Harris	Houston	11.63	18.72	Louetta Road / Jones Road	
Harris		13.08	21.05	Spring-Cypress Road	
Harris		14.54	23.40	SH 249 (Frontage Road) / Northpointe Boulevard / Boudreaux Road	Last free northbound exit before entering the Tomball Tollway
Harris		15.99	25.73	Tomball Tollway begins	Southern terminus of the Tomball Tollway
Harris		17.45	28.08	Tomball Tollway Mainlane Toll Plaza; Electronic toll tags only, no cash allowed	
Harris		18.90	30.42	SH 99 Toll (Grand Parkway)	Direct ramps to east and westbound Grand Parkway (SH 99) from northbound Tomball Tollway
Harris	Tomball	20.35	32.75	Bus. SH 249 north / Holderrieth Road / Alice Road	Southern terminus of Bus. SH 249; access to HCA Houston Healthcare Tomball
Harris	Tomball	21.81	35.10	FM 2920 / Bus. SH 249 south – Tomball, Hooks Airport / Alice Road	Access to HCA Houston Healthcare Tomball
Harris	Tomball	23.26	37.43	Brown Road / Baker Road / Zion Road	Access to Lone Star College-Tomball campus
Harris–Montgomery county line		24.72	39.78	Tomball Tollway ends MCTRA 249 Tollway begins	Northern terminus of HCTRA's Tomball Tollway; southern terminus of MCTRA 249 Tollway
Montgomery		26.17	42.12	Decker Prairie Road / Hardin Store Road	
Montgomery		27.62	44.45	Decker Prairie Tolling Zone; Electronic toll tags only; cash and pay-by-mail not allowed.	
Montgomery		29.08	46.80	FM 1774 / Woodtrace Boulevard – Magnolia	Southern terminus of FM 1774 (not signed southbound); last southbound exit for traffic paying by mail.
Montgomery		30.53	49.13	MCTRA 249 Tollway ends SH 249 Toll begins	Northern terminus of MCTRA 249 Tollway; southern terminus of SH 249 Toll (Aggie Expressway)
Montgomery		31.99	51.48	FM 149	
Montgomery		33.44	53.82	Mainlane Toll Gantry North of FM 149; Electronic toll tags or pay-by-mail (cash not accepted)	
Montgomery		34.90	56.17	Audubon Boulevard	
Montgomery		36.35	58.50	FM 1488	
Montgomery		37.80	60.83	FM 1488 west (Magnolia Relief Route) – Hempstead	Proposed exit; eastern terminus of proposed Magnolia Relief Route
Montgomery		39.26	63.18	Jackson Road	Proposed exit; would connect to FM 149 northeast of Magnolia
Montgomery		40.71	65.52	FM 1486	
Montgomery		42.17	67.87	Mainlane Toll Gantry North of CR 115; Electronic toll tags or pay-by-mail (cash not accepted)	
Grimes	Todd Mission	43.62	70.20	FM 1774	Northbound terminus of toll road and start of two-lane freeway; last free southbound exit before start of toll road
Grimes	Todd Mission	45.08	72.55	SH 249 Toll ends SH 249 begins	Northern terminus of SH 249 Toll; Aggie Expressway continues as SH 249 without tolls
Grimes		46.53	74.88	CR 304	
Grimes		47.98	77.22	CR 306 to SH 105 east	Northbound exit and southbound entrance; provides access to eastbound SH 105 via CR 306 west and FM 1748 north
Grimes		49.44	79.57	SH 105 west SH 249 ends	Northern terminus of SH 249; no exit to SH 105 east
1.000 mi = 1.609 km; 1.000 km = 0.621 mi: Tolled; Route transition; Unopened
