= Texas State Highway 242 =

State highway in Texas

State Highway 242
- SH 242, highlighted in red

Route information
- Maintained by TxDOT
- Length: 21.633 mi (34.815 km)
- Existed: 1985–present

Major junctions
- West end: FM 1488 in The Woodlands
- I-45 in Conroe
- East end: I-69 / US 59 in Patton Village

Location
- Country: United States
- State: Texas
- Counties: Montgomery

Highway system
- Highways in Texas; Interstate; US; State; Former; Toll; Loops; Spurs; FM/RM; Park; Rec
← SH 241	→ SH 243

State Highway 242 (SH 242) is a Texas state highway connecting The Woodlands and Patton Village in southeast Texas.

== Route description ==
SH 242 begins at FM 1488 in The Woodlands. The highway, also known locally as College Park Drive, curves to the southeast and passes to the south of W. G. Jones State Forest. It then turns to the east and crosses I-45 in the southern outskirts of Conroe. East of I-45, the highway is also known locally as Needham Road until its intersection with Lexington Drive, where Needham Road turns north towards the San Jacinto River. The route continues to the east, crossing FM 1314 and FM 1485, before reaching its eastern terminus at I-69 / US 59 in Patton Village.

== History ==
SH 242 was originally designated on December 22, 1936 as a route from SH 6 at or near Hempstead to SH 38 (now SH 6) at or near Sugar Land. This route was deleted on September 26, 1939, as it became part of SH 6. SH 242 was designated between I-45 and US 59 (now dual-signed as I-69/US 59) on May 22, 1985. The westward extension to FM 1488 was designated on May 29, 1986.

A pair of flyover ramps connecting SH 242 westbound to southbound I-45 and northbound I-45 to westbound SH 242 were constructed in 2015 by the Montgomery County Transportation Program (MCTP). The flyovers were both tolled, utilizing solely electronic toll collection and were opened to the public on May 11, 2015, initially toll-free. Between July 6, 2015, and May 28, 2019, the flyovers were tolled, with the Montgomery County Toll Road Authority (MCTRA) owning and maintaining the ramps while the Harris County Toll Road Authority (HCTRA) collected the toll fees. After a unanimous vote by the Montgomery County Commissioners Court, the tolls on the flyovers were lifted, with ownership and maintenance being transferred to the Texas Department of Transportation (TxDOT). Another flyover ramp from northbound I-45 to eastbound SH 242 is scheduled for bidding beginning in August 2024, with construction commencing by the end of the year. This project will have an estimated cost of $19.1 Million. Long term plans also include a three-level diamond interchange with an overpass for SH 242 through movements over I-45.

== Major intersections ==
The entire route is in Montgomery County.

Location	mi	km	Destinations	Notes
The Woodlands	0.0	0.0	FM 1488 – Magnolia, Conroe	Western terminus
Conroe	4.4	7.1	I-45 – Houston, Dallas	I-45 exit 79 southbound; 79A & 79B northbound.
Conroe	4.7	7.6	South Trade Center Parkway	Interchange
	10.5	16.9	FM 1314 – Conroe, Porter	Interchange
	15.2	24.5	FM 1485 – New Caney	
Patton Village	21.6	34.8	I-69 / US 59 – Houston, Cleveland	I-69/US 59 exit 161; eastern terminus.
1.000 mi = 1.609 km; 1.000 km = 0.621 mi
