= Texas Park Road 36 =

Road in Texas, United States

PR 36
- Possum Kingdom State Park Road
- PR 36 highlighted in red

Route information
- Maintained by TxDOT
- Length: 5.606 mi (9.022 km)
- Existed: 1945–present

Major junctions
- West end: Camp Constantin BSA/Camp Grady Spruce YMCA
- FM 2951; FM 2353 in Pickwick
- East end: SH 16

Location
- Country: United States
- State: Texas
- Counties: Palo Pinto

Highway system
- Highways in Texas; Interstate; US; State; Former; Toll; Loops; Spurs; FM/RM; Park; Rec
← FM 36	→ I-37

Park Road 36 (PR 36) is a 5.606-mile-long (9.022 km) Park Road in the U.S. state of Texas maintained by the Texas Department of Transportation (TxDOT). The road, located in northwestern Palo Pinto County west of Graford, was authorized in 1945 to provide access to a former section of Possum Kingdom State Park. PR 36 has since been extended to two private campgrounds connecting them to State Highway 16 (SH 16) while intersecting FM 2951 and FM 2353.

== Route description ==
PR 36 begins at the main entrance for the Boy Scouts of America camp, Camp Constantin, and the YMCA camp, Camp Grady Spruce; the main road of the highway travels through the former. The highway travels in close proximity to Possum Kingdom Lake's southern shore, before reaching FM 2951. The highway turns towards the east, traveling through the small town of Pickwick where it intersects FM 2353. Leaving Pickwick, PR 36 travels away from the lake, ending at SH 16, about 10 miles (16 km) west of Graford.

== History ==
PR 36 was originally designated in 1945 over an approximately 3.2-mile (5.1 km) segment connecting a former portion of Possum Kingdom State Park to SH 16. The road was extended 1.6 miles (2.6 km) westward to the Lakeview subdivision a year later. The final 0.8-mile (1.3 km) extension to the current western terminus at the organizational campgrounds was added in 1947.

== Major intersections ==
The entire route is in Palo Pinto County.

Location	mi	km	Destinations	Notes
	0.0	0.0	Camp Constantin/Camp Grady Spruce main entrances	Eastern terminus
	1.1	1.8	FM 2951 west	
Pickwick	3.6	5.8	FM 2353 – Graham, Brazos River Authority	
	5.6	9.0	SH 16 – Graford, Graham, Strawn	Western terminus
1.000 mi = 1.609 km; 1.000 km = 0.621 mi
