= List of Farm to Market Roads in Texas (1400–1499) =

- Texas Farm to Market Road and Ranch to Market Road markers

Highway names
- Interstates: Interstate Highway X (IH-X, I-X)
- US Highways: U.S. Highway X (US X)
- State: State Highway X (SH X)
- Loops: Loop X
- Spurs: Spur X
- Recreational: Recreational Road X (RE X)
- Farm or Ranch to Market Roads: Farm to Market Road X (FM X); Ranch to Market Road X (RM X)
- Park Roads: Park Road X (PR X)

System links
- Highways in Texas; Interstate; US; State; Former; Toll; Loops; Spurs; FM/RM; Park; Rec

Farm to Market Roads in Texas are owned and maintained by the Texas Department of Transportation (TxDOT).

== FM 1400 ==
Farm to Market Road 1400
- Location: Morris County
- Length: 2.389 mi (3.845 km)
- Existed: July 15, 1949–present

== FM 1401 ==
Farm to Market Road 1401
- Location: Panola and Shelby counties
- Length: 17.9 mi (28.8 km)
- Existed: July 15, 1949–November 15, 1970

Farm to Market Road 1401 was a designation applied to a road in Panola and Shelby counties. No highway currently uses the FM 1401 designation.

FM 1401 was designated on July 15, 1949, from US 79 in Carthage south 9.2 miles to a road intersection. FM 1401 was extended southeast 5.3 miles to Old Center on August 24, 1955, another 2.2 miles southeast to the Shelby County line on July 11, 1968 and a final 1.5 miles south to US 84 in Paxton on January 21, 1969. FM 1401 was cancelled on November 15, 1970 and became a portion of FM 699.

== FM 1402 ==
Farm to Market Road 1402
- Location: Titus County
- Length: 12.696 mi (20.432 km)
- Existed: July 15, 1949–present

Farm to Market Road 1402 (FM 1402) is a road located north of U.S. Highway 67 in Titus County. The road starts north of U.S. Highway 67, continuing Industrial Road with the name FM 1402. FM 1402 ends at Farm to Market 71.

== FM 1403 ==
Farm to Market Road 1403
- Location: Uvalde County
- Length: 1.232 mi (1.983 km)
- Existed: November 1, 1968–present

=== FM 1403 (1949) ===
Farm to Market Road 1403
- Location: Upshur and Gregg counties
- Existed: July 14, 1949–August 2, 1968

A previous route numbered FM 1403 was designated on July 14, 1949, from US 271 south of Gilmer, southeast to the Gregg County line. On May 23, 1951, the road was extended southeast 7.1 miles (11.4 km) to US 80, 1 mile (1.6 km) west of Longview. FM 1403 was cancelled on August 2, 1968, and redesignated as SH 300.

== FM 1404 ==
Farm to Market Road 1404
- Location: Upshur County
- Length: 6.699 mi (10.781 km)
- Existed: July 15, 1949–present

== FM 1405 ==
Farm to Market Road 1405
- Location: Chambers County
- Length: 8.483 mi (13.652 km)
- Existed: July 15, 1949–present

== FM 1406 ==
Farm to Market Road 1406
- Location: Jefferson and Chambers counties
- Length: 12.877 mi (20.724 km)
- Existed: July 15, 1949–present

== FM 1407 ==
Farm to Market Road 1407
- Location: Dimmit County
- Length: 7.376 mi (11.871 km)
- Existed: October 28, 1953–present

=== FM 1407 (1949) ===
Farm to Market Road 1407
- Location: Jasper County
- Existed: July 15, 1949–October 28, 1953

A previous route numbered FM 1407 was designated on July 15, 1949, from US 96 at Buna northwest 3.2 miles (5.1 km) to a road intersection. On November 20, 1951, the designation was extended northwest 1.0 mile (1.6 km), and it was extended another 6.1 miles (9.8 km) north on December 17, 1952. FM 1407 was cancelled on October 28, 1953, and its mileage was transferred to FM 1004.

== FM 1408 ==
Farm to Market Road 1408
- Location: Jasper County
- Length: 5.348 mi (8.607 km)
- Existed: July 15, 1949–present

== FM 1409 ==
Farm to Market Road 1409
- Location: Liberty and Chambers counties
- Length: 14.096 mi (22.685 km)
- Existed: July 15, 1949–present

Farm to Market Road 1409 (FM 1409) is located in Liberty and Chambers counties. It runs from US 90 in Dayton to FM 565 west of Cove.

FM 1409 was designated on July 14, 1949, from US 90 in Dayton to Dayton Canal. On May 23, 1951, the road was extended south 8.2 miles (13.2 km) to FM 565 at Winfree (now Old River-Winfree). On May 25, 2010, the designation was extended south 4.6 miles (7.4 km) to another point on FM 565, but this was cancelled prior to the start of construction. On March 27, 2014, the extension was proposed again.

== FM 1410 ==
Farm to Market Road 1410
- Location: Liberty and Chambers counties
- Length: 15.490 mi (24.929 km)
- Existed: July 15, 1949–present

== FM 1411 ==
Farm to Market Road 1411
- Location: Nacogdoches County
- Length: 0.838 mi (1,349 m)
- Existed: March 21, 1960–present

Farm to Market Road 1411 (FM 1411), known locally as Appleby Sand Road, is a 0.8-mile (1.3 km) route in northeastern Nacogdoches that connects FM 1878 with FM 2609.

=== FM 1411 (1949) ===
Farm to Market Road 1411
- Location: Liberty County
- Existed: July 15, 1949–December 18, 1959

A previous route numbered FM 1411 was designated on July 15, 1949, from FM 1011, 1.8 miles (2.9 km) west of Hardin, west to a road intersection. FM 1411 was cancelled on December 18, 1959, and its mileage was transferred to FM 834.

== FM 1412 ==
Farm to Market Road 1412
- Location: Deaf Smith County
- Length: 14.534 mi (23.390 km)
- Existed: November 30, 1949–present

Farm to Market Road 1412 (FM 1412) is located in Deaf Smith County. It runs from US 385 to SH 214.

FM 1412 was designated on November 30, 1949, from FM 1058, 23 miles (37 km) west of Hereford, north and east 37.4 miles (60.2 km) to SH 51 (now US 385). On December 1, 1953, the road was extended south 5.7 miles (9.2 km) to the Parmer County line. On October 26, 1954, the road was extended south, east and south 12.5 miles (20.1 km) to Friona. On December 12, 1956, the section from Friona to FM 290 was signed (but not designated) as SH 214. On August 29, 1990, this section was cancelled as the SH 214 designation became official.

=== FM 1412 (1949) ===
Farm to Market Road 1412
- Location: San Jacinto County
- Existed: July 15, 1949–November 30, 1949

The original FM 1412 was proposed from US 59 in Cleveland northwest 2.6 miles (4.2 km) to the San Jacinto County line. FM 1412 was cancelled on November 30, 1949 and removed from the highway system in exchange for extending FM 163. The route was restored as FM 2025 in 1952.

== FM 1413 ==
Farm to Market Road 1413
- Location: Liberty County
- Length: 5.143 mi (8.277 km)
- Existed: July 15, 1949–present

== FM 1414 ==
Farm to Market Road 1414
- Location: Newton County
- Length: 15.699 mi (25.265 km)
- Existed: July 15, 1949–present

== FM 1415 ==
Farm to Market Road 1415
- Location: Newton County
- Length: 5.673 mi (9.130 km)
- Existed: July 15, 1949–present

== FM 1416 ==
Farm to Market Road 1416
- Location: Newton County
- Length: 14.715 mi (23.681 km)
- Existed: July 15, 1949–present

== FM 1417 ==
Farm to Market Road 1417
- Location: Grayson County
- Length: 17.598 mi (28.321 km)
- Existed: October 31, 1958–present

=== FM 1417 (1949) ===
Farm to Market Road 1417
- Location: Tyler County
- Existed: July 14, 1949–January 29, 1953

A previous route numbered FM 1417 was designated on July 14, 1949, from US 69 at Colmesneil southeast 6.0 miles (9.7 km). On November 20, 1951, the road was extended 4.8 miles (7.7 km) to a road intersection. On December 17, 1952, the road was extended to US 190. FM 1417 was cancelled on January 29, 1953, and transferred to FM 256.

== FM 1418 ==
Farm to Market Road 1418
- Location: Brooks County
- Length: 5.907 mi (9.506 km)
- Existed: July 15, 1949–present

== FM 1419 ==
Farm to Market Road 1419
- Location: Cameron County
- Length: 12.292 mi (19.782 km)
- Existed: July 15, 1949–present

Farm to Market Road 1419 (FM 1419) is located in Cameron County. It runs from SH 4 to SH 32.

FM 1419 as designated on July 15, 1949, from FM 511, 2.5 miles (4.0 km) southeast of Brownsville, southeast 4.5 miles (7.2 km) to South Point. On October 7, 1949, the road was extended 3.4 miles (5.5 km) northwest to SH 4 in Brownsville, replacing a section of FM 511. On September 21, 1955, the road was extended 5.1 miles (8.2 km) east and north to SH 4. On December 30, 1956, a 0.33-mile (0.53 km) section from old SH 4 at 14th Street to new SH 4 at International Boulevard was returned to Brownsville. On June 30, 1995, the section from SH 4 southeast to UR 511 was transferred to UR 1419, but that section was transferred back to FM 1419 on November 15, 2018. On April 29, 2010, the route was shortened to SH 32: the section from 1.9 miles (3.1 km) west of FM 3068 to FM 3068 and 0.4 miles (0.64 km) north of Dockberry Road to 0.7 miles (1.1 km) south of SH 4 were redesignated as SH 32, the section from FM 3068 to north of Dockberry Road was redesignated as FM 3550 and the section from 0.7 miles (1.1 km) south of SH 4 to SH 4 was redesignated as FM 3551.

== FM 1420 ==
Farm to Market Road 1420
- Location: Cameron and Willacy counties
- Length: 17.871 mi (28.761 km)
- Existed: July 15, 1949–present

== FM 1421 ==
Farm to Market Road 1421
- Location: Cameron County
- Length: 12.292 mi (19.782 km)
- Existed: July 15, 1949–present

== FM 1422 ==
Farm to Market Road 1422
- Location: Hidalgo County
- Length: 4.964 mi (7.989 km)
- Existed: July 15, 1949–present

== FM 1423 ==
Farm to Market Road 1423
- Location: Hidalgo County
- Length: 9.889 mi (15.915 km)
- Existed: July 15, 1949–present

== FM 1424 ==
Farm to Market Road 1424
- Location: Hale and Swisher counties
- Length: 44.825 mi (72.139 km)
- Existed: May 23, 1951–present

=== FM 1424 (1949) ===
Farm to Market Road 1424
- Location: Hidalgo County
- Existed: July 15, 1949–September 7, 1949

A previous route numbered FM 1424 was designated on July 14, 1949, from US 83, 0.8 miles (1.3 km) west of Donna, south 1.4 miles (2.3 km) to a road intersection. Two months later FM 1424 was cancelled and became a portion of FM 1423.

== FM 1425 ==
Farm to Market Road 1425
- Location: Hidalgo, Cameron, and Willacy counties
- Length: 23.489 mi (37.802 km)
- Existed: July 15, 1949–present

== FM 1426 ==
Farm to Market Road 1426
- Location: Hidalgo County
- Length: 7.558 mi (12.163 km)
- Existed: July 15, 1949–present

== FM 1427 ==
Farm to Market Road 1427
- Location: Hidalgo County
- Length: 6.448 mi (10.377 km)
- Existed: July 15, 1949–present

== FM 1428 ==
Farm to Market Road 1428
- Location: Madison County
- Length: 9.243 mi (14.875 km)
- Existed: July 25, 1951–present

=== FM 1428 (1949) ===
Farm to Market Road 1428
- Location: Hidalgo County
- Existed: July 15, 1949–July 16, 1951

A previous route numbered FM 1428 was designated on July 15, 1949, from US 83 in Mercedes, south 5.5 miles (8.9 km) to US 281. FM 1428 was cancelled on July 16, 1951, and became a portion of FM 491.

== FM 1429 ==
Farm to Market Road 1429
- Location: Gaines County
- Length: 16.849 mi (27.116 km)
- Existed: June 21, 1951–present

=== FM 1429 (1949) ===
Farm to Market Road 1429
- Location: Starr County
- Existed: July 15, 1949–November 30, 1949

A previous route numbered FM 1429 was designated on July 15, 1949, from FM 755 west and northwest 9.3 miles (15.0 km) to the Jim Hogg County line. Four months later FM 1429 was cancelled and became a portion of FM 1017.

== FM 1430 ==
Farm to Market Road 1430
- Location: Starr County
- Length: 4.179 mi (6.725 km)
- Existed: July 15, 1949–present

== RM 1431 ==
Ranch to Market Road 1431
- Location: Llano, Burnet, Travis, and Williamson counties
- Length: 66.418 mi (106.889 km)
- Existed: May 23, 1951 (Note: RM 1431 was originally designated as FM 1431 from 1951 to 1956.)–present

=== FM 1431 (1949) ===
Farm to Market Road 1431
- Location: Starr County
- Existed: July 15, 1949–November 30, 1949

A previous route numbered FM 1431 was designated in Starr County on July 15, 1949, from FM 755 east approximately 10 miles (16 km) to the Hidalgo County line at La Reforma. FM 1431 was cancelled on November 30 of that year and became a portion of FM 1017.

== FM 1432 ==
Farm to Market Road 1432
- Location: Victoria County
- Length: 1.945 mi (3.130 km)
- Existed: October 15, 1965–present

=== FM 1432 (1949) ===
Farm to Market Road 1432
- Location: Willacy County
- Existed: July 15, 1949–June 1, 1964

A previous route numbered FM 1432 was designated on July 14, 1949, from US 77, 1.3 miles (2.1 km) south of Raymondville, west 1.8 miles (2.9 km) to a road intersection. On December 2, 1953, the road was extended east 5.0 miles (8.0 km) to FM 2099. On October 26, 1954, the road was extended west 3.3 miles (5.3 km) to FM 1015. FM 1432 was cancelled on June 1, 1964, and transferred to FM 490.

== FM 1433 ==
Farm to Market Road 1433
- Location: Dimmit and Zavala counties
- Length: 10.608 mi (17.072 km)
- Existed: July 15, 1949–present

== FM 1434 ==
Farm to Market Road 1434
- Location: Johnson County
- Length: 17.287 mi (27.821 km)
- Existed: December 17, 1952–present

Farm to Market Road 1434 (FM 1434) is located in Johnson County. It runs from US 67 west of Cleburne to PR 21, with a spur connection, designated FM Spur 1434, to Lake Pat Cleburne.

FM 1434 was designated on December 17, 1952 (numbered January 16, 1953 or later), from SH 171 south of Cleburne southwest 5.5 miles (8.9 km) to a road intersection. On March 1, 1960, the road was extended southwest 3.7 miles (6.0 km) to another road intersection, and southwest 5.7 miles (9.2 km) to yet another road intersection on August 1, 1963. On July 30, 1964, the northern terminus was relocated to US 67: a 1.3-mile (2.1 km) section from the junction of old and new FM 1434 northeast to Cleburne Reservoir (now Lake Pat Cleburne) became FM Spur 1434, a 0.7-mile (1.1 km) section through the reservoir area was removed from the highway system, and a 3.5-mile (5.6 km) section from SH 171 at Cleburne southwest to the reservoir was renumbered as FM 1718. On June 1, 1966, the road was extended west and northwest 7.1 miles (11.4 km) to PR 21. On January 2, 2006, a 0.14-mile (0.23 km) section of FM Spur 1434 was removed from the highway system and returned to the city of Cleburne.

=== FM 1434 (1949) ===
Farm to Market Road 1434
- Location: Real County
- Existed: July 15, 1949–January 16, 1953

A previous route numbered FM 1434 was designated from SH 41, 8 miles (13 km) east of the Edwards County line, south 9.4 miles (15.1 km). On May 23, 1951, the road was extended 2.6 miles (4.2 km) south, and another 2.5 miles (4.0 km) south on November 20 of that year. FM 1434 was cancelled on January 16, 1953, and transferred to RM 336.

== FM 1435 ==
Farm to Market Road 1435
- Location: Uvalde County
- Length: 3.073 mi (4.946 km)
- Existed: July 15, 1949–present

== FM 1436 ==
Farm to Market Road 1436
- Location: Zavala County
- Length: 14.436 mi (23.232 km)
- Existed: July 15, 1949–present

== FM 1437 ==
Farm to Market Road 1437
- Location: Hudspeth County
- Length: 16.377 mi (26.356 km)
- Existed: July 21, 1949–present

Farm to Market Road 1437 (FM 1437) is located in Hudspeth County. Its southern terminus is at US 62/US 180, about 7 miles (11 km) west of Salt Flat. It runs northward approximately 13 miles (21 km) to Dell City, where it intersects FM 2249. The northern terminus is approximately 3.0 miles (4.8 km) north of this point, with the roadway continuing as CR 2025 to the New Mexico state line.

FM 1437 was designated on June 21, 1949, from US 62 to Dell City. It was extended to its current northern terminus on September 29, 1954.

== FM 1438 ==
Farm to Market Road 1438
- Location: Childress County
- Length: 4.238 mi (6.820 km)
- Existed: July 15, 1949–present

== FM 1439 ==
Farm to Market Road 1439
- Location: Collingsworth County
- Length: 9.133 mi (14.698 km)
- Existed: July 15, 1949–present

== FM 1440 ==
Farm to Market Road 1440
- Location: Cottle County
- Length: 15.599 mi (25.104 km)
- Existed: July 15, 1949–present

== FM 1441 ==
Farm to Market Road 1441
- Location: Bastrop County
- Length: 6.553 mi (10.546 km)
- Existed: July 31, 1964–present

Farm to Market Road 1441 (FM 1441) is located in Bastrop County. It runs from SH 95 to SH 21.

FM 1441 was designated on July 31, 1964, from SH 95 eastward 2.8 miles (4.5 km) to Lake Bastrop. On July 11, 1968, FM 1441 was extended east to SH 21. On September 26, 2024, FM Spur 1441 was designated north of Lake Bastrop on a 0.2 mile route along former FM 1441 from current FM 1441 to Green Valley Drive.

=== FM 1441 (1949) ===
Farm to Market Road 1441
- Location: Crosby and Dickens counties
- Existed: July 15, 1949–December 1, 1960

A previous route numbered FM 1441 was designated on July 15, 1949, from FM 264 at McAdoo northwest to a road intersection and a second section from FM 264 at McAdoo east to a road intersection, creating a concurrency with FM 264, a total distance of 4.7 miles (7.6 km). On May 23, 1951, the road was extended north and east 4.7 miles (7.6 km) to another road intersection. On December 17, 1952, the road was extended east 6.0 miles (9.7 km) to SH 70. On October 26, 1954, the road was extended north and west 5.0 miles (8.0 km) to FM 1472 at Wake School. On November 1, 1954, the section west of FM 28 was transferred to FM 28 (as well as FM 1472 itself). FM 1441 was cancelled on November 1, 1960, and transferred to FM 193.

== FM 1442 ==
Farm to Market Road 1442
- Location: Orange County
- Length: 15.428 mi (24.829 km)
- Existed: May 22, 1959–present

=== FM 1442 (1949) ===
Farm to Market Road 1442
- Location: Motley County
- Existed: July 15, 1949–November 20, 1951

The first use of the FM 1442 designation was in Motley County, from SH 70 at White Flat to a point 4.0 miles (6.4 km) east, north and east. FM 1442 was cancelled on November 20, 1951, and eliminated from the highway system.

=== FM 1442 (1951) ===
Farm to Market Road 1442
- Location: Collingsworth County
- Existed: November 20, 1951–November 26, 1958

The next use of the FM 1442 designation was in Collingsworth County, from FM 338 west 4.6 miles (7.4 km) to a road intersection west of Buck School. On October 31, 1958, the road was extended west and north to SH 203 at Quail. FM 1442 was cancelled on November 26, 1958, and transferred to FM 1056.

== FM 1443 ==
Farm to Market Road 1443
- Location: Wheeler County
- Length: 10.102 mi (16.258 km)
- Existed: July 15, 1949–present

== FM 1444 ==
Farm to Market Road 1444
- Location: Milam County
- Length: 4.284 mi (6.894 km)
- Existed: July 20, 1949–present

== FM 1445 ==
Farm to Market Road 1445
- Location: Milam and Falls counties
- Length: 8.904 mi (14.330 km)
- Existed: July 20, 1949–present

== FM 1446 ==
Farm to Market Road 1446
- Location: Ellis County
- Length: 8.904 mi (14.330 km)
- Existed: August 25, 1949–present

== FM 1447 ==
Farm to Market Road 1447
- Location: De Witt County
- Length: 8.904 mi (14.330 km)
- Existed: July 21, 1949–present

== FM 1448 ==
Farm to Market Road 1448
- Location: Wood and Franklin counties
- Length: 9.173 mi (14.763 km)
- Existed: July 21, 1949–present

== FM 1449 ==
Farm to Market Road 1449
- Location: Freestone County
- Length: 1.705 mi (2.744 km)
- Existed: July 21, 1949–present

== FM 1450 ==
Farm to Market Road 1450
- Location: Reeves and Pecos counties
- Length: 44.134 mi (71.027 km)
- Existed: May 23, 1951–present

=== FM 1450 (1949) ===
Farm to Market Road 1450
- Location: Freestone County
- Existed: July 21, 1949–February 15, 1950

A previous route numbered FM 1450 was designated on July 21, 1949, from SH 14 in Wortham west 1.6 miles (2.6 km) to the Freestone County line. Seven months later FM 1450 was cancelled and became a portion of FM 27.

== FM 1451 ==
Farm to Market Road 1451
- Location: Freestone County
- Length: 6.421 mi (10.334 km)
- Existed: July 21, 1949–present

== FM 1452 ==
Farm to Market Road 1452
- Location: Madison County
- Length: 21.077 mi (33.920 km)
- Existed: July 25, 1951–present

=== FM 1452 (1949) ===
Farm to Market Road 1452
- Location: Matagorda and Brazoria counties
- Existed: July 22, 1949–September 15, 1949

A previous route numbered FM 1452 was designated on July 22, 1949, from the Wharton County line, southeast 18.4 miles (29.6 km) via Pledger to an intersection with SH 36 at West Columbia. Two months later FM 1452 was cancelled and became a portion of FM 1301.

== FM 1453 ==
Farm to Market Road 1453
- Location: Hemphill and Lipscomb counties
- Length: 10.48 mi (16.87 km)
- Existed: July 21, 1949–present

== FM 1454 ==
Farm to Market Road 1454
- Location: Lipscomb County
- Length: 22.686 mi (36.510 km)
- Existed: July 21, 1949–present

== FM 1455 ==
Farm to Market Road 1455
- Location: Lipscomb County
- Length: 3.012 mi (4.847 km)
- Existed: July 21, 1949–present

== FM 1456 ==
Farm to Market Road 1456
- Location: Austin County
- Length: 11.127 mi (17.907 km)
- Existed: July 22, 1949–present

== FM 1457 ==
Farm to Market Road 1457
- Location: Austin County and Fayette County
- Length: 12.879 mi (20.727 km)
- Existed: July 22, 1949–present

== FM 1458 ==
Farm to Market Road 1458
- Location: Austin and Waller counties
- Length: 21.119 mi (33.988 km)
- Existed: July 22, 1949–present

Farm to Market Road 1458 (FM 1458) is located in Austin and Waller counties. It runs from FM 359 at Pattison west and south to FM 1093.

FM 1458 was designated on July 22, 1949, from US 90 (now I-10) south 4.2 miles (6.8 km) via Frydek to a county road. On September 20, 1961, the road was extended south 7.2 miles (11.6 km) to FM 1093. On January 20, 1966, the road was extended north to the Brazos River, replacing Spur 99 (formerly SH 249). On July 11, 1968, a Farm to Market Road was designated across the Brazos River. On September 11, 1968, the road was extended east and south 7.5 miles (12.1 km) to FM 359 at Pattison, replacing FM 2572.

== FM 1459 ==
Farm to Market Road 1459
- Location: Brazoria County
- Length: 11.240 mi (18.089 km)
- Existed: July 22, 1949–present

== FM 1460 ==
Farm to Market Road 1460
- Location: Williamson County
- Length: 8.066 mi (12.981 km)
- Existed: October 31, 1958–present

Farm to Market Road 1460 (FM 1460) is located in Williamson County.

FM 1460 was designated on October 31, 1958, from SH 29 in Georgetown southward to US 79. On October 29, 1992, FM 1460 was designated to be rerouted west to RM 2243 and Business Interstate 35-M (now Spur 26); the old route to SH 29 was turned over to Georgetown. On August 31, 2021, FM 1460 was rerouted slightly east on a new route to the SE Inner Loop; the old route became FM Spur 1460.

=== FM 1460 (1949) ===
Farm to Market Road 1460
- Location: Brazoria County
- Existed: July 22, 1949–October 24, 1956

A previous route numbered FM 1460 was designated on July 22, 1949, from FM 523 in Velasco to 0.2 miles (0.32 km) south of the Intracoastal Canal. On January 12, 1950, the road was extended across the Intracoastal Canal, replacing SH 332. On September 27, 1954, the road was adjusted to begin northeast of Velasco and to end at a road intersection. Two days later the road was extended northwest to SH 288. On October 15, 1954, the road was extended northwest to FM 521, replacing FM 1605 and creating a concurrency with SH 288. FM 1460 was cancelled on October 24, 1956, and transferred back to SH 332.

== FM 1461 ==
Farm to Market Road 1461
- Location: Collin County
- Length: 6.952 mi (11.188 km)
- Existed: March 26, 1953–present

Farm to Market Road 1461 (FM 1461) is located in Collin County.

FM 1461 was designated on March 26, 1953, from SH 289 south of Celina eastward to what was then FM 1828 (the designation of the north–south section of FM 1461 at the time). On May 20, 1955, FM 1461 was extended south replacing FM 1828 to US 380 (University Drive) (then SH 24). On August 30, 2001, the section south of County Road 123/164 (Bloomdale Road) was given to the city of McKinney. FM 1461 is known as Frontier Pkwy in Celina/Prosper, Laud Howell Pkwy in McKinney for west/east, and Lake Forest Dr in McKinney for north/south. The entire route is in Collin County.

| Location | mi | km | Destinations | Notes |
|---|---|---|---|---|
| Celina–Prosper line | 0.0 | 0.0 | SH 289 (Preston Road) | Western terminus |
| Celina–Prosper line | 1.0 | 1.6 | Coit Road/County Road 83 | |
| Celina–Prosper– McKinney tripoint | 3.1 | 5.0 | FM 2478 (Custer Road) | |
| McKinney | 6.0 | 9.7 | FM 1461 south (Lake Forest Dr) | FM 1461 turns southward |
| McKinney | 7.0 | 11.3 | Bloomdale Road (CR 123 west/CR 164 east) | Southern terminus |
1.000 mi = 1.609 km; 1.000 km = 0.621 mi

=== FM 1461 (1949) ===
Farm to Market Road 1461
- Location: Brazoria and Galveston counties
- Existed: July 22, 1949–January 16, 1953

A previous route numbered FM 1461 was designated on July 22, 1949, from SH 35 in Alvin to FM 518 south of Friendswood. FM 1461 was canceled on January 16, 1953, and transferred to FM 528.

== FM 1462 ==
Farm to Market Road 1462
- Location: Brazoria and Fort Bend counties
- Length: 32.100 mi (51.660 km)
- Existed: July 15, 1949–present

Farm to Market Road 1462 (FM 1462) is located in Brazoria and Fort Bend counties. It runs from SH 36 in Damon to SH 35 in Alvin.

FM 1462 was designated on July 14, 1949, from SH 288 at Rosharon to SH 35 south of Alvin. On September 27, 1960, the road was extended west 7.0 miles (11.3 km) to the Brazos River. On October 10, 1961, the road was extended to SH 36 north of Damon, replacing a section of FM 762. On June 28, 1963, the eastern terminus was relocated, shortening the route by 0.4 miles (0.64 km).

== FM 1463 ==
Farm to Market Road 1463
- Location: Fort Bend County
- Length: 7.349 mi (11.827 km)
- Existed: July 22, 1949–present

Farm to Market Road 1463 (FM 1463) is located in Fort Bend County.

The southern terminus of FM 1463 is at an intersection with FM 1093 and FM 359. The route travels north through rural areas of Fort Bend County before entering Katy. It has a junction with I-10 at exit 740. After crossing the interstate, the route continues through Katy, passing Katy High School, before reaching its northern terminus at US 90 near the tripoint with Waller and Harris counties.

FM 1463 was designated on July 22, 1949, along the current route, to connect Katy to the community of Flewellen. The community, near the intersection with FM 1093 and FM 359, existed at least through the 1980s.

== FM 1464 ==
Farm to Market Road 1464
- Location: Fort Bend County
- Length: 7.649 mi (12.310 km)
- Existed: July 22, 1949–present

== FM 1465 ==
Farm to Market Road 1465
- Location: Bee County
- Length: 4.174 mi (6.717 km)
- Existed: October 28, 1953–present

FM 1465 was numbered on November 13, 1953.

=== FM 1465 (1949) ===
Farm to Market Road 1465
- Location: Frio County
- Existed: July 22, 1949–January 29, 1953

The first use of the FM 1465 designation was in Frio County, from US 81 in Pearsall northwest 5.0 miles (8.0 km) towards Batesville. On December 22, 1949, the road was extended 4.3 miles (6.9 km) to a road intersection, and was extended another 7.2 miles (11.6 km) to Frio Town on December 18, 1951. FM 1465 was cancelled on January 29, 1953, and transferred to FM 140.

=== FM 1465 (1952) ===
Farm to Market Road 1465
- Location: Fayette County
- Existed: December 17, 1952–November 13, 1953

The next use of the FM 1465 designation was in Fayette County from SH 159 east 3.0 miles (4.8 km) to the Colorado County line. It was numbered on January 29, 1953. FM 1465 was cancelled on November 13, 1953, and transferred to FM 1291.

== FM 1466 ==
Farm to Market Road 1466
- Location: Williamson County
- Length: 6.72 mi (10.81 km)
- Existed: December 17, 1952–present

=== FM 1466 (1949) ===
Farm to Market Road 1466
- Location: Galveston County
- Existed: July 22, 1949–February 21, 1952

A previous route numbered FM 1466 was designated on July 22, 1949, from FM 517 at Dickinson, northeast 6.7 miles (10.8 km) to SH 146, 0.5 miles (0.80 km) south of Kemah. FM 1466 was cancelled on February 21, 1952, and eliminated from the highway system. The route became FM 1266 once right of way was acquired.

== FM 1467 ==
Farm to Market Road 1467
- Location: Brown County
- Length: 21.314 mi (34.302 km)
- Existed: July 15, 1949–present

== FM 1468 ==
Farm to Market Road 1468
- Location: Matagorda County
- Length: 21.491 mi (34.586 km)
- Existed: July 22, 1949–present

== FM 1469 ==
Farm to Market Road 1469
- Location: Leon County
- Length: 6.102 mi (9.820 km)
- Existed: March 26, 1953–present

=== FM 1469 (1949) ===
Farm to Market Road 1469
- Location: Matagorda County
- Existed: July 22, 1949–January 16, 1953

A previous route numbered FM 1469 was designated on July 22, 1949, from SH 60 at Wadsworth east 6.6 miles (10.6 km) to a road intersection. On November 20, 1951, the road was extended northeast 4.6 miles (7.4 km) to a road intersection. On December 17, 1952, the road was extended northeast 6.0 miles (9.7 km) to FM 457. FM 1469 was cancelled on January 16, 1953, and transferred to FM 521.

== FM 1470 ==
Farm to Market Road 1470
- Location: Atascosa County
- Length: 6.447 mi (10.375 km)
- Existed: October 31, 1958–present

=== FM 1470 (1949) ===
Farm to Market Road 1470
- Location: Crosby County
- Existed: July 20, 1948–November 21, 1957

A previous route numbered FM 1470 was designated on July 20, 1948, from Leatherwood School, 0.3 miles (0.48 km) north of US 82, to a point 2.0 miles (3.2 km) south. FM 1470 was cancelled on November 21, 1957, and transferred to FM 836.

== FM 1471 ==
Farm to Market Road 1471
- Location: Crosby County
- Length: 16.03 mi (25.80 km)
- Existed: July 20, 1948–present

== FM 1472 ==
Farm to Market Road 1472
- Location: Webb County
- Length: 33.587 mi (54.053 km)
- Existed: April 1, 1955–present

=== FM 1472 (1949) ===
Farm to Market Road 1472
- Location: Crosby County
- Existed: July 20, 1948–November 1, 1954

A previous route numbered FM 1472 was designated on July 20, 1948, from US 82 east of Crosbyton north to Wake School. FM 1472 was cancelled on November 1, 1954, and became a portion of FM 28.

== FM 1473 ==
Farm to Market Road 1473
- Location: Bosque County
- Length: 8.857 mi (14.254 km)
- Existed: July 25, 1951–present

=== FM 1473 (1949) ===
Farm to Market Road 1473
- Location: Waller County
- Existed: July 22, 1949–September 15, 1949

A previous route numbered FM 1473 was designated on July 22, 1949, from US 290 northwest to FM 1098. Two months later FM 1473 was cancelled and became a portion of FM 362.

== RM 1474 ==
Ranch to Market Road 1474
- Location: Gray County
- Length: 8.527 mi (13.723 km)
- Existed: October 31, 1958–present

=== FM 1474 (1949) ===
Farm to Market Road 1474
- Location: Brown County
- Existed: July 15, 1949–January 6, 1953

FM 1474 was designated on July 14, 1949, from US 83, 5 miles (8.0 km) south of Brownwood, east and south 13.7 miles (22.0 km) to the Mills County line. FM 1474 was cancelled on January 6, 1953, and transferred to FM 45.

== FM 1475 ==
Farm to Market Road 1475
- Location: Angelina County
- Length: 6.447 mi (10.375 km)
- Existed: October 31, 1958–present

=== FM 1475 (1949) ===
Farm to Market Road 1475
- Location: Coleman County
- Existed: July 15, 1949–March 31, 1950

A previous route numbered FM 1475 was designated on July 15, 1949, from US 67/US 84 in Santa Anna southeast 6.7 miles (10.8 km) to a road intersection. Eight months later FM 1475 was cancelled and became a portion of FM 1176.

== FM 1476 ==
Farm to Market Road 1476
- Location: Comanche County
- Length: 23.783 mi (38.275 km)
- Existed: July 15, 1949–present

== FM 1477 ==
Farm to Market Road 1477
- Location: Comanche County
- Length: 9.224 mi (14.845 km)
- Existed: July 15, 1949–present

== FM 1478 ==
Farm to Market Road 1478
- Location: Lampasas County and Burnet County
- Length: 10.723 mi (17.257 km)
- Existed: July 15, 1949 (Note: FM 1478 was designated as RM 1478 from 1968 to 1992.)–present

Farm to Market Road 1478 (FM 1478) is located in Lampasas and Burnet counties. It runs from FM 580 in Lampasas to Naruna.

FM 1478 was designated on July 15, 1949, from FM 580 in Lampasas southwest 3.5 miles (5.6 km) to the Burnet County line. On February 26, 1968, the road was extended north 3 blocks due to relocation of FM 580. Five months later the road was extended southwest 7.1 miles (11.4 km) to Naruna and changed to RM 1478, but was changed back to FM 1478 on May 5, 1992.

== FM 1479 ==
Farm to Market Road 1479
- Location: Cameron County
- Length: 9.216 mi (14.832 km)
- Existed: September 21, 1955–present

Farm to Market Road 1479 (FM 1479) begins from I-69E/US 77/US 83 in Harlingen, southwestward via Rangerville to US 281.

=== FM 1479 (1949) ===
Farm to Market Road 1479
- Location: San Saba County
- Existed: July 15, 1949–September 28, 1955

A previous route numbered FM 1479 was designated on July 14, 1949, from FM 45 east 3.0 miles (4.8 km) to a road intersection at Locker. FM 1479 was cancelled on September 28, 1955, and transferred to FM 500.

== FM 1480 ==
Farm to Market Road 1480
- Location: San Saba County
- Length: 5.716 mi (9.199 km)
- Existed: July 15, 1949–present

== FM 1481 ==
Farm to Market Road 1481
- Location: Stephens County
- Length: 6.323 mi (10.176 km)
- Existed: July 15, 1949–present

== FM 1482 ==
Farm to Market Road 1482
- Location: Fayette County
- Length: 0.388 mi (624 m)
- Existed: July 22, 1949–present

== FM 1483 ==
Farm to Market Road 1483
- Location: Wood County
- Length: 1.597 mi (2.570 km)
- Existed: July 14, 1949–present

== FM 1484 ==
Farm to Market Road 1484
- Location: Montgomery County
- Length: 13.702 mi (22.051 km)
- Existed: July 22, 1949–present

Farm to Market Road 1484 (FM 1484) is located in Montgomery County, it starts at an intersection with Loop 336 in northern Conroe and travels roughly north-northeast, passing by Conroe-North Houston Regional Airport and various rural neighborhoods before turning east for a few miles and finally taking a sharp southward turn towards Highway 105 and terminating at an intersection with it near Cut and Shoot.

The current alignment of FM 1484 near its western terminus has only been in commission since 2010, after the old alignment (now referred to as Airport Road) was planned to be bisected by a runway expansion at Conroe-North Houston Regional Airport. When the new alignment around the expanded runway of the airport was completed, the original routing near the western terminus was removed from the FM 1484 designation and maintenance was returned to the City of Conroe.

== FM 1485 ==
Farm to Market Road 1485
- Location: Montgomery and Harris counties
- Length: 23.981 mi (38.594 km)
- Existed: July 22, 1949–present

Farm to Market Road 1485 (FM 1485) is located in Montgomery and Harris counties. Its western terminus is at an intersection with SH 105, 3.5 miles (5.6 km) east of Conroe. It travels southeast, intersecting Loop 494 in New Caney, where there is a break in the route. FM 1485 resumes 0.1 miles (0.16 km) south of there, heading east and briefly running along the frontage road of the SH 99 (Grand Parkway) toll road into Harris County, ending at Plum Grove Road. The roadway continues under county maintenance as Huffman-Cleveland Road, which becomes FM 2100 toward Huffman approximately 4 miles (6.4 km) to the south.

FM 1485 was designated on July 22, 1949, running 9.3 miles (15.0 km) from SH 105 to FM 2090 in Montgomery County. It was extended eastward on August 22, 1951, to US 59 (now cosigned I-69), adding 8.4 miles (13.5 km). FM 1485 was extended 5.4 miles (8.7 km) on September 27, 1951, replacing FM 1773, moving its eastern terminus to the Harris County line. On June 1, 1965, it was extended 1.2 miles (1.9 km) into Harris County. The old route of US 59 was redesignated Loop 494 on October 2, 1970, and FM 1485 was redescribed to indicate the gap there.

Junction list

| County | Location | mi | km | Destinations | Notes |
|---|---|---|---|---|---|
| Montgomery | Conroe | 0.000 | 0.000 | SH 105 – Conroe | Western terminus of section 1 |
| Montgomery | | | | FM 2090 | |
| Montgomery | | | | FM 3083 / Old Houston Road | |
| Montgomery | | | | SH 242 | |
| Montgomery | New Caney | | | I-69 / US 59 – Cleveland, Houston | I-69/US 59 exit 159 |
| Montgomery | New Caney | | | Loop 494 | Eastern terminus of section 1 |
| Montgomery | New Caney | 0.1-mile (0.16 km) gap | | | |
| Montgomery | New Caney | | | Loop 494 | Western terminus of section 2 |
| Montgomery | | | | SH 99 Toll (Grand Parkway) | FM 1485 runs along SH 99 frontage road for 2.8-mile (4.5 km) |
| Harris | | 23.981 | 38.594 | To FM 2100 / Plum Grove Road | Eastern terminus of section 2; roadway continues as Huffman-Cleveland Road |
1.000 mi = 1.609 km; 1.000 km = 0.621 mi

== FM 1486 ==
Farm to Market Road 1486
- Location: Grimes and Montgomery counties
- Length: 29.847 mi (48.034 km)
- Existed: July 22, 1949–present

Farm to Market Road 1486 (FM 1486) is located in Grimes and Montgomery counties. It runs from SH 30 at Shiro to FM 1774 northwest of Magnolia.

FM 1486 was designated on July 22, 1949, from SH 105 at Dobbin northwest to Dacus. On August 22, 1951, the road was extended south 11.0 miles (17.7 km) to FM 1774. On November 2, 1955, the road was extended to FM 149 at Richards, replacing FM 1776. On October 31, 1958, the road was extended north 6.5 miles (10.5 km) to SH 45 (now SH 30) at Shiro, creating a concurrency with FM 149.

== FM 1487 ==
Farm to Market Road 1487
- Location: Red River County
- Length: 9.95 mi (16.01 km)
- Existed: July 22, 1949–present

== FM 1488 ==
Farm to Market Road 1488
- Location: Waller, Harris, and Montgomery counties
- Length: 41.158 mi (66.237 km)
- Existed: July 22, 1949–present

Farm to Market Road 1488 (FM 1488) is located in Greater Houston. Its western terminus is at an intersection with Bus. US 290 in Hempstead and travels east-northeast, ending at I-45 between The Woodlands and Conroe. The road travels through rural parts of Waller, Harris, and Montgomery counties and directly through the town of Magnolia.

FM 1488 as designated on July 22, 1949, from US 290 (now a business route) to FM 1098. On December 27, 1952, FM 1488 was extended to US 75 (now I-45). On July 11, 1968, part of the old location of FM 149 was transferred to FM 1488. On May 30, 2019, a proposed bypass around Magnolia was designated; when the bypass is completed, the old route of FM 1488 will be redesignated as Business FM 1488-P. Part of the bypass will be concurrent with the frontage roads for SH 249.

Junction list

| County | Location | mi | km | Destinations | Notes |
|---|---|---|---|---|---|
| Waller | Hempstead | 0.0 | 0.0 | Second Street | Southern continuation beyond Business 290 |
| Waller | Hempstead | 0.0 | 0.0 | Bus. US 290 – Prairie View, Waller, Hockley | Western terminus; former US 290 / SH 6 |
| Waller | Hempstead | 1.5 | 2.4 | US 290 / SH 6 – Houston, Austin | Interchange |
| Waller | | 5.6 | 9.0 | FM 1098 | |
| Waller | | 8.5 | 13.7 | FM 1736 | |
| Waller | | 8.6 | 13.8 | FM 362 south | West end of FM 362 overlap |
| Harris | No major junctions | | | | |
| Waller | | 11.5 | 18.5 | FM 362 north | East end of FM 362 overlap |
| Montgomery | Magnolia | 22.8 | 36.7 | FM 1774 (Magnolia Boulevard) – Pinehurst | |
| Montgomery | | 24.7 | 39.8 | SH 249 Toll (Aggie Expressway) – Tomball, Houston | Interchange |
| Montgomery | | 26.4 | 42.5 | FM 149 – Montgomery | Western half of Butler's Crossing (interchange) |
| Montgomery | | 27.3 | 43.9 | Access road to Magnolia High School | Eastern half of Butler's Crossing (interchange) |
| Montgomery | | 27.7 | 44.6 | FM Spur 149 south | |
| Montgomery | | 34.3 | 55.2 | FM 2978 south (Honea-Egypt Road) – Lake Conroe, Tomball | Honea Egypt Corner; northern terminus of FM 2978 |
| Montgomery | | 37.8 | 60.8 | SH 242 east (College Park Drive) – The Woodlands | |
| Montgomery | Conroe | 40.9 | 65.8 | I-45 – Houston, Conroe, Dallas | Interchange; I-45 exit 81; former US 75 |
| Montgomery | Conroe | 41.2 | 66.3 | Sherbrook Drive | Eastern terminus |
1.000 mi = 1.609 km; 1.000 km = 0.621 mi: Concurrency terminus; Tolled

== FM 1489 ==
Farm to Market Road 1489
- Location: Fort Bend and Waller counties
- Length: 16.934 mi (27.253 km)
- Existed: July 22, 1949–present

Farm to Market Road 1489 (FM 1489) is located in Fort Bend and Waller counties. It runs from US 90 near Brookshire to FM 1952.

FM 1489 was designated on July 22, 1949, from US 90, 0.8 miles (1.3 km) west of Brookshire southwest 5.6 miles (9.0 km) to the Fort Bend County line. On December 17, 1952, the road was extended south 3.7 miles (6.0 km) to FM 1093. On July 30, 1963, the road was extended south 5.6 miles (9.0 km) to SH 36 at Orchard, replacing FM 2758. On September 1, 1968, the road was extended south 2.6 miles (4.2 km) to FM 1952.

Junction list

| County | Location | mi | km | Destinations | Notes |
|---|---|---|---|---|---|
| Waller | Brookshire | | | US 90 | |
| Waller | Gap in route at I-10 due to bridge demolition and rebuilding | | | | |
| Fort Bend | Simonton | | | FM 1093 west | North end of FM 1093 overlap |
| Fort Bend | Simonton | | | FM 1093 east | South end of FM 1093 overlap |
| Fort Bend | Orchard | | | SH 36 | |
| Fort Bend | | | | FM 1952 | |
1.000 mi = 1.609 km; 1.000 km = 0.621 mi

== FM 1490 ==
Farm to Market Road 1490
- Location: Hockley and Lamb counties
- Length: 22.291 mi (35.874 km)
- Existed: July 22, 1949–present

== FM 1491 ==
Farm to Market Road 1491
- Location: Fannin County
- Length: 0.307 mi (494 m)
- Existed: June 1, 1948–present

== RM 1492 ==
Ranch to Market Road 1492
- Location: Midland County and Upton County
- Length: 18.011 mi (28.986 km)
- Existed: June 28, 1963–present

=== FM 1492 (1949) ===
Farm to Market Road 1492
- Location: Ellis County
- Existed: August 25, 1949–June 1, 1962

A previous route numbered FM 1492 was designated on August 25, 1949, from US 77, 3.5 miles (5.6 km) south of Waxahachie, southeast 5.6 miles (9.0 km) to Nash. On October 25, 1955, the road was extended southeast 5.3 miles (8.5 km) to SH 34 at Avalon. FM 1492 was cancelled on June 1, 1962, and transferred to FM 55.

== FM 1493 ==
Farm to Market Road 1493
- Location: Ellis County
- Length: 2.228 mi (3.586 km)
- Existed: August 25, 1949–present

== FM 1494 ==
Farm to Market Road 1494
- Location: Lampasas County
- Length: 2.212 mi (3.560 km)
- Existed: August 25, 1949–present

== FM 1495 ==
Farm to Market Road 1495
- Location: Brazoria County
- Length: 3.972 mi (6.392 km)
- Existed: September 21, 1955–present

Farm to Market Road 1495 (FM 1495) is located in Brazoria County.

The northern terminus of FM 1495 is at FM 523, south of plants belonging to the Dow Chemical Company. Taking a southeast-to-south route, the highway crosses the old Brazos River, passing the Storm Surge Lock to the west of the bridge. Becoming Navigation Boulevard, FM 1495 continues through the east end of Freeport, passing the Port of Freeport and intersecting with SH 36 and SH 288 (the concurrent highways end at FM 1495). Then making a turn to the southeast, the highway crosses the Intracoastal Waterway, giving drivers a view of the beach and the Gulf of Mexico. The southern terminus of FM 1495 is at the end of the bridge with a four-way stop at County Road 723, Quintana's main road. Continuing past the stop sign takes drivers to Bryan Beach.

FM 1495 was designated on September 21, 1955, from SH 36 to the Gulf of Mexico. On May 6, 1964, the route was extended north around the eastern edge of Freeport to its current northern terminus at FM 523.

FM 1495 once crossed the Intracoastal Waterway via a swing bridge. The bridge was replaced in 2003 due to concerns of Hurricane Evacuation and Emergency Personnel.

=== FM 1495 (1949) ===
Farm to Market Road 1495
- Location: Lampasas County
- Existed: August 25, 1949–September 2, 1955

A previous route numbered FM 1495 was designated on August 25, 1949, from US 190 west 2.2 miles (3.5 km) to a road intersection in Lampasas County. On October 26, 1954, the designation was extended southwest to FM 580. FM 1495 was cancelled on September 2, 1955, and the mileage was transferred to FM 581.

== FM 1496 ==
Farm to Market Road 1496
- Location: Comanche County
- Length: 9.086 mi (14.622 km)
- Existed: August 25, 1949–present

== FM 1497 ==
Farm to Market Road 1497
- Location: Lamar County
- Length: 21.955 mi (35.333 km)
- Existed: August 25, 1949–present

== FM 1498 ==
Farm to Market Road 1498
- Location: Lamar County
- Length: 10.310 mi (16.592 km)
- Existed: August 25, 1949–present

== FM 1499 ==
Farm to Market Road 1499
- Location: Lamar County
- Length: 16.321 mi (26.266 km)
- Existed: August 25, 1949–present
