= Texas State Highway Loop 494 =

State highway in Texas

State Highway Loop 494

Route information
- Maintained by TxDOT
- Length: 9.79 mi (15.76 km)
- Existed: 1970–present

Major junctions
- South end: I-69 / US 59 in Houston
- SH 99 Toll at New Caney
- North end: I-69 / US 59 in New Caney

Location
- Country: United States
- State: Texas
- Counties: Harris, Montgomery

Highway system
- Highways in Texas; Interstate; US; State; Former; Toll; Loops; Spurs; FM/RM; Park; Rec
| ← Loop 493 | → Loop 497 |

Loop 494 is a state highway loop in the Greater Houston area of Texas. It is 9.7 miles (15.6 km) in length and is a former routing of US 59 in the area.

== Route description ==
Loop 494 begins at I-69/US 59 just south of the Harris–Montgomery county line. The route travels northward, paralleling the freeway to its west. It passes the community of Kingwood and the unincorporated area of Porter before reaching New Caney, where it has a brief concurrency with FM 1485. Shortly thereafter, it connects once again with I-69/US 59, where the Loop 494 designation ends.

== History ==
Loop 494 was designated on October 2, 1970, after US 59 was moved to the extension of the Eastex Freeway into Montgomery County.

== Major intersections ==
All exits are unnumbered.

| County | Location | mi | km | Destinations | Notes |
|---|---|---|---|---|---|
| Harris | Houston | | | I-69 / US 59 – Humble, Downtown Houston | I-69/US 59 exit 151; southern terminus just south of Hamblen Road at the Montgomery/Harris County line. |
| Montgomery | Porter | | | FM 1314 north – Williams Airport | |
| Montgomery | New Caney | | | SH 99 Toll (Grand Parkway) to I-69 / US 59 – Spring, Baytown | Access to eastbound Grand Parkway via Texas U-turn at I-69/US 59 |
| Montgomery | New Caney | | | FM 1485 east – Huffman | South end of FM 1485 concurrency |
| Montgomery | New Caney | | | FM 1485 west – Conroe | North end of FM 1485 concurrency |
| Montgomery | New Caney | | | I-69 / US 59 – Cleveland | I-69/US 59 exit 159(B); northern terminus. |
1.000 mi = 1.609 km; 1.000 km = 0.621 mi: Concurrency terminus; Tolled
