= List of Farm to Market Roads in Texas (2900–2999) =

- Texas Farm to Market Road and Ranch to Market Road markers

Highway names
- Interstates: Interstate Highway X (IH-X, I-X)
- US Highways: U.S. Highway X (US X)
- State: State Highway X (SH X)
- Loops: Loop X
- Spurs: Spur X
- Recreational: Recreational Road X (RE X)
- Farm or Ranch to Market Roads: Farm to Market Road X (FM X); Ranch to Market Road X (RM X)
- Park Roads: Park Road X (PR X)

System links
- Highways in Texas; Interstate; US; State; Former; Toll; Loops; Spurs; FM/RM; Park; Rec

Farm to Market Roads in Texas are owned and maintained by the Texas Department of Transportation (TxDOT).

== RM 2900 ==
Ranch to Market Road 2900
- Location: Llano County
- Length: 5.272 mi (8.484 km)
- Existed: August 5, 1966–present

Ranch to Market Road 2900 (RM 2900) is located in Llano County. It runs from RM 1431 near Kingsland south across the Llano River arm of Lake Lyndon B. Johnson to RM 2233, 3 miles (4.8 km) northeast of SH 71.

RM 2900 was designated on August 5, 1966, on the current route.

In October 2018, the RM 2900 bridge across the Llano River collapsed due to heavy flooding. The rebuilt bridge opened in May 2019.

=== FM 2900 ===
Farm to Market Road 2900
- Location: Ochiltree County
- Existed: May 6, 1964–May 12, 1966

Farm to Market Road 2900 (FM 2900) was designated on May 6, 1964, from US 83, 7.2 miles (11.6 km) south of Perryton, east 7.5 miles (12.1 km) to a road intersection. FM 2900 was cancelled on May 12, 1966, and became a portion of FM 2711.

== FM 2901 ==
Farm to Market Road 2901
- Location: Lamb County
- Length: 5.995 mi (9.648 km)
- Existed: 1964–present

Farm to Market Road 2901 (FM 2901) runs from FM 1055, 2.0 miles north of Earth, eastward to US 385.

== FM 2902 ==
Farm to Market Road 2902
- Location: Lubbock County
- Length: 5.211 mi (8.386 km)
- Existed: 1964–present

Farm to Market Road 2902 (FM 2902) runs from FM 597, east of Abernathy, southward to FM 1729.

== FM 2903 ==
Farm to Market Road 2903
- Location: Reeves County
- Length: 22.133 mi (35.620 km)
- Existed: May 6, 1964–present

Farm to Market Road 2903 (FM 2903) is located in southwestern Reeves County.

FM 2903 begins at I-10 exit 203, which also serves as the western terminus of Business I-10, approximately 2 miles (3.2 km) northwest of Balmorhea. The two-lane roadway proceeds to the north, intersecting FM 3334, before trending to the northwest toward Toyah. FM 2903 enters Toyah as South Centre Street and ends at I-20 exit 22.

FM 2903 was designated on May 6, 1964, from a point 10.5 miles (16.9 km) south of Toyah to US 80, which preceded the construction of I-20. On July 11, 1968, FM 2903 was extended 10.0 miles (16.1 km) over FM 2954. The 1.9-mile (3.1 km) segment of FM 2903 between I-10 and SH 17 was designated as part of Business I-10 on November 21, 1991.

== FM 2904 ==
Farm to Market Road 2904
- Location: Bell County
- Length: 4.404 mi (7.088 km)
- Existed: 1964–present

Farm to Market Road 2904 (FM 2904) runs from FM 2086 at Ratibor eastward to SH 320.

== FM 2905 ==
Farm to Market Road 2905
- Location: Hamilton County
- Length: 6.293 mi (10.128 km)
- Existed: 1964–present

Farm to Market Road 2905 (FM 2905) runs from US 281 in Hamilton northeastward to the Leon River Bridge.

== FM 2906 ==
Farm to Market Road 2906
- Location: Gregg County
- Length: 4.404 mi (7.088 km)
- Existed: 1964–present

Farm to Market Road 2906 (FM 2906) is located in Gregg County. It runs from SH 149 near Lakeport east to the Rusk County line in Easton. It was designated on May 6, 1964, as Ranch to Market Road 2906 (RM 2906), running along its current route. The designation was changed to FM 2906 on May 5, 1992.

== FM 2907 ==
Farm to Market Road 2907
- Location: Rusk County
- Length: 2.197 mi (3.536 km)
- Existed: 1964–present

Farm to Market Road 2907 (FM 2907) runs from FM 1971, south of Calendonia, eastward to the Shelby County Line.

== FM 2908 ==
Farm to Market Road 2908
- Location: Smith County
- Length: 5.112 mi (8.227 km)
- Existed: May 6, 1964–present

Farm to Market Road 2908 (FM 2908) is a 5.112-mile (8.227 km) state road in Smith County that connects SH 31 (east of Tyler) with US 271 (east of Owentown).

== RM 2909 ==
Ranch to Market Road 2909
- Location: Van Zandt County
- Length: 9.054 mi (14.571 km)
- Existed: 1964–present

Ranch to Market Road 2909 (RM 2909) runs from SH 19, south of Canton, southeastward via Walnut Springs Community to FM 858 near Martin's Mill.

== FM 2910 ==
Farm to Market Road 2910
- Location: Lamb County
- Length: 1.95 mi (3.14 km)
- Existed: February 23, 1978–present

Farm to Market Road 2910 (FM 2910) runs from US 70, west of FM 303, southward 1.95 miles (3.14 km).

=== FM 2910 (1964) ===
Farm to Market Road 2910
- Location: Wood County
- Existed: May 6, 1964–October 28, 1977

A previous route numbered FM 2910 was designated on May 6, 1964, from FM 852, 1.5 miles (2.4 km) southeast of Winnsboro, to a point 4.3 miles (6.9 km) south. On September 5, 1973, the road was extended south 2.1 miles (3.4 km). On May 7, 1974, the road was extended 2.4 miles (3.9 km) south to FM 2088/FM 3274, replacing FM 3274, though signage did not change until the connecting section was open to traffic. FM 2910 was cancelled on October 28, 1977, and became a portion of FM 2869.

== FM 2911 ==
Farm to Market Road 2911
- Location: Upshur and Wood counties
- Length: 3.101 mi (4.991 km)
- Existed: 1964–present

Farm to Market Road 2911 (FM 2911) runs from SH 155 in Big Sandy northwestward to FM 2659.

== FM 2912 ==
Farm to Market Road 2912
- Location: Trinity County
- Length: 1.51 mi (2.43 km)
- Existed: 1964–present

Farm to Market Road 2912 (FM 2912) runs from US 287 in Groveton, southwestward 1.51 miles (2.43 km).

== FM 2913 ==
Farm to Market Road 2913
- Location: Shelby County
- Length: 3.168 mi (5.098 km)
- Existed: 1964–present

Farm to Market Road 2913 (FM 2913) runs from SH 7, east of Grigsby, northward to Waterman Community.

== FM 2914 ==
Farm to Market Road 2914
- Location: San Jacinto County
- Length: 1.708 mi (2.749 km)
- Existed: 1964–present

Farm to Market Road 2914 (FM 2914) runs from I-69/US 59, south of Shepherd, eastward 1.708 miles (2.749 km).

== FM 2915 ==
Farm to Market Road 2915
- Location: Houston County
- Length: 5.277 mi (8.493 km)
- Existed: 1964–present

Farm to Market Road 2915 (FM 2915) runs from FM 230, 7.0 miles south of Lovelady, westward approx. 5.277 miles (8.493 km).

== FM 2916 ==
Farm to Market Road 2916
- Location: Wilbarger County
- Length: 3.042 mi (4.896 km)
- Existed: April 25, 1978–present

Farm to Market Road 2916 (FM 2916) runs from US 283, north of FM 924, eastward 3.042 miles (4.896 km).

=== FM 2916 (1964) ===
Farm to Market Road 2916
- Location: Austin County
- Existed: May 6, 1964–April 6, 1970

The first use of the FM 2916 designation was in Austin County, from FM 331 (now FM 529) near Burleigh northeast 4.8 miles (7.7 km) to a county road. FM 2916 was cancelled on April 6, 1970, and became a portion of FM 331.

=== FM 2916 (1970) ===
Farm to Market Road 2916
- Location: Angelina County
- Existed: May 7, 1970–November 8, 1977

The next use of the FM 2916 designation was in Angelina County, from FM 1475 south 2.6 miles (4.2 km) to US 69 near Homer. On November 3, 1972, the road was extended west 1.8 miles (2.9 km) to FM 841. FM 2916 was cancelled on November 8, 1977: the section from FM 841 east 1.6 miles (2.6 km) was transferred to FM 1475 and the section from US 69 to FM 1475 was transferred to FM 326.

== FM 2917 ==
Farm to Market Road 2917
- Location: Brazoria County
- Length: 9.385 mi (15.104 km)
- Existed: May 6, 1964–present

Farm to Market Road 2917 (FM 2917) is located in Brazoria County. It begins at FM 2004 between Hitchcock and Lake Jackson. The route travels to the northwest, running parallel to and crossing branch lines of the Union Pacific Railroad to Monsanto and Solutia factories. Just north of a crossing of the busy Union Pacific main line at Chocolate Bayou, FM 2917 meets FM 2403 at a three-way stop. FM 2917 continues northwest to its northern terminus at SH 35/future SH 99 north of Liverpool and southwest of Alvin.

FM 2917 was designated on May 6, 1964, along the current route.

== FM 2918 ==
Farm to Market Road 2918
- Location: Brazoria County
- Length: 9.743 mi (15.680 km)
- Existed: May 6, 1964–present

Farm to Market Road 2918 (FM 2918) is located in Brazoria County.

FM 2918 begins at a boat ramp at the Intracoastal Waterway. The two-lane road travels to the northwest, roughly paralleling the San Bernard River and providing access to riverfront communities. The San Bernard National Wildlife Refuge lies along the south side of the road. The route ends at an intersection with FM 2611 in the community of Hinkles Ferry, Texas.

FM 2918 was commissioned on May 6, 1964, from FM 2611 southwest 5.2 miles (8.4 km) to the community of McNeel. The 4.6 miles (7.4 km) extension to the Intracoastal Waterway was designated on June 1, 1965.

== FM 2919 ==
Farm to Market Road 2919
- Location: Fort Bend and Wharton counties
- Length: 7.095 mi (11.418 km)
- Existed: May 6, 1964–present

Farm to Market Road 2919 (FM 2919) is located in Fort Bend and Wharton counties. It runs from SH 60 in East Bernard southeast to US 59 in Kendleton. FM 2919 starts as a two-lane road at a stop sign on SH 60 at the southern edge of East Bernard and heads in an easterly direction for about 2.4 miles (3.9 km). After veering to the southeast for another 0.8 miles (1.3 km) the highway crosses the San Bernard River and enters Fort Bend County near the Bay Ridge Christian College. From the river to the tiny community of Powell Point is 1.1 miles (1.8 km). FM 2919 continues to the southeast for another 2.7 miles (4.3 km) to Loop 541 and the Union Pacific Railroad in Kendleton. From Loop 541 to the US 59 feeder road and overpass is a short block.

FM 2919 was originally designated on May 6, 1964, to begin at US 90 Alt. in Kendleton in Fort Bend County, go about 3.8 miles (6.1 km) to the northwest and end at the San Bernard River. On January 18, 1967, a 3.5-mile (5.6 km) section of FM 1164 between SH 60 and the San Bernard River in Wharton County was transferred to FM 2919. On June 21, 1977, FM 2919 was extended about 0.1 miles (0.16 km) southeast from US 59 (now Loop 541) to the proposed US 59.

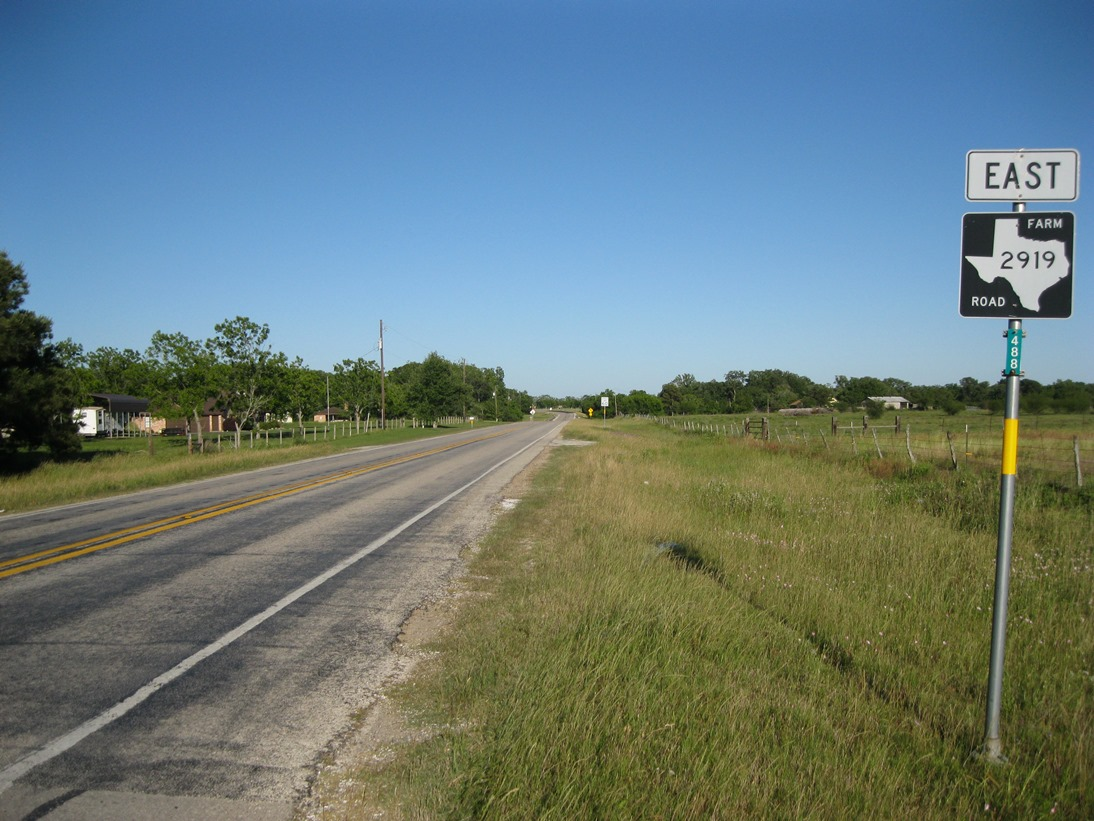
View east on FM 2919 near SH 60 in East Bernard

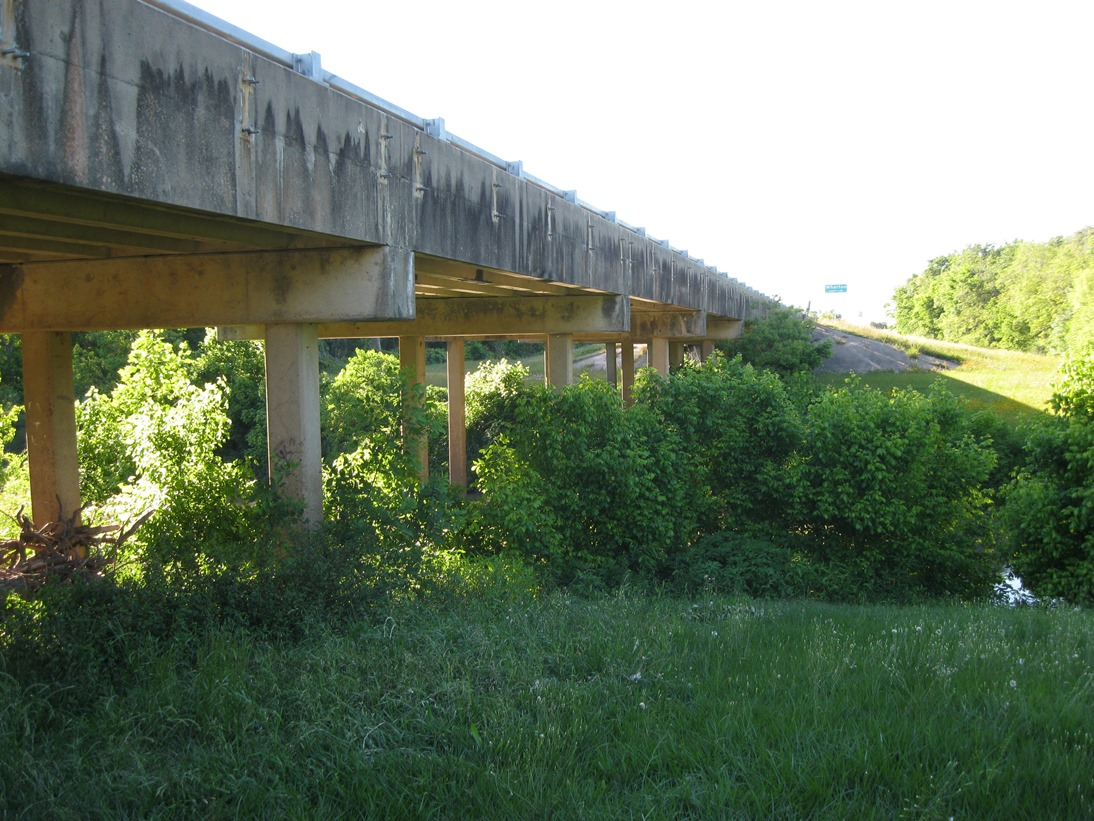
FM 2919 bridge over the San Bernard River

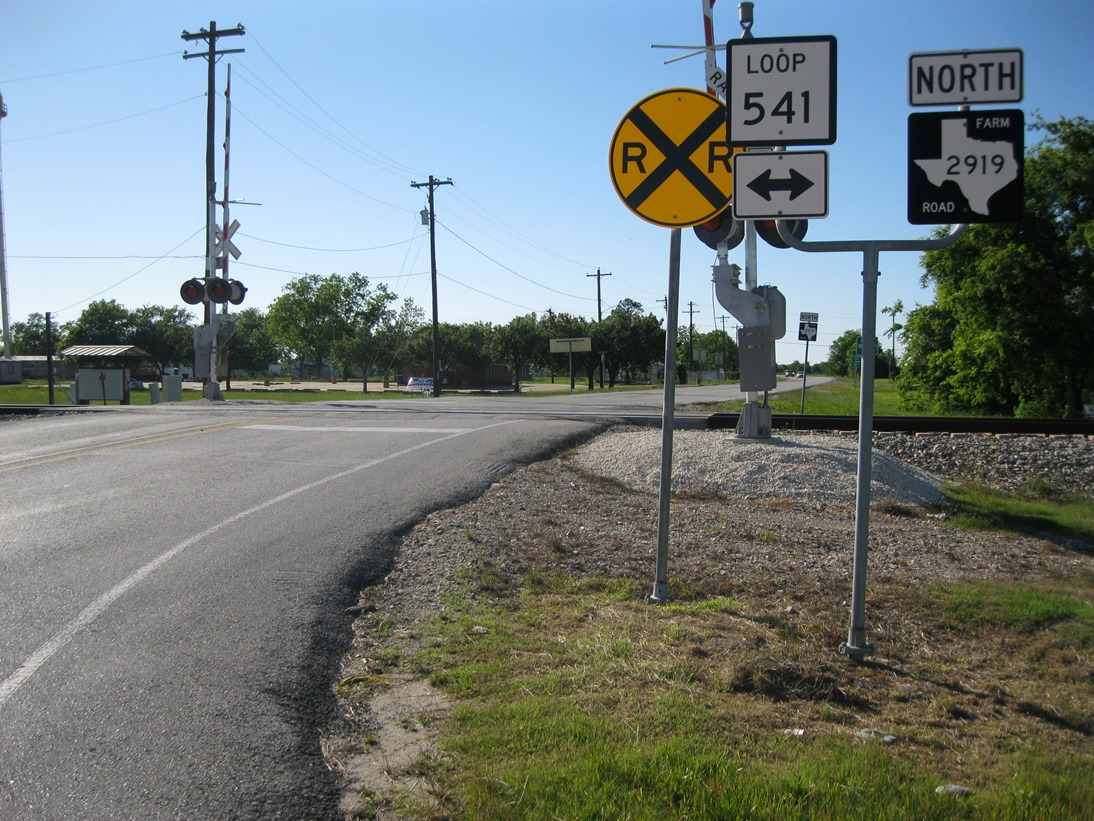
View northwest at FM 2919 and Loop 541 junction

== FM 2920 ==
Farm to Market Road 2920
- Location: Harris County
- Length: 30.849 mi (49.647 km)
- Existed: May 6, 1964–present

Farm to Market Road 2920 (FM 2920) is located in Harris County. It runs from US 290 Business in Waller east to I-45 in Spring. The highway has an interchange with US 290 and SH 6 in Waller, then heads east and intersects SH 249, FM 2978, and SH 99 in Tomball, it then gains a brief concurrency with Spring-Cypress Road (another major east–west route in the area) for approximately 0.47 miles before reaching its eastern terminus at I-45. The highway mostly follows old Waller–Tomball Road west of SH 249; through the Tomball city limits the highway follows the city's Main Street.

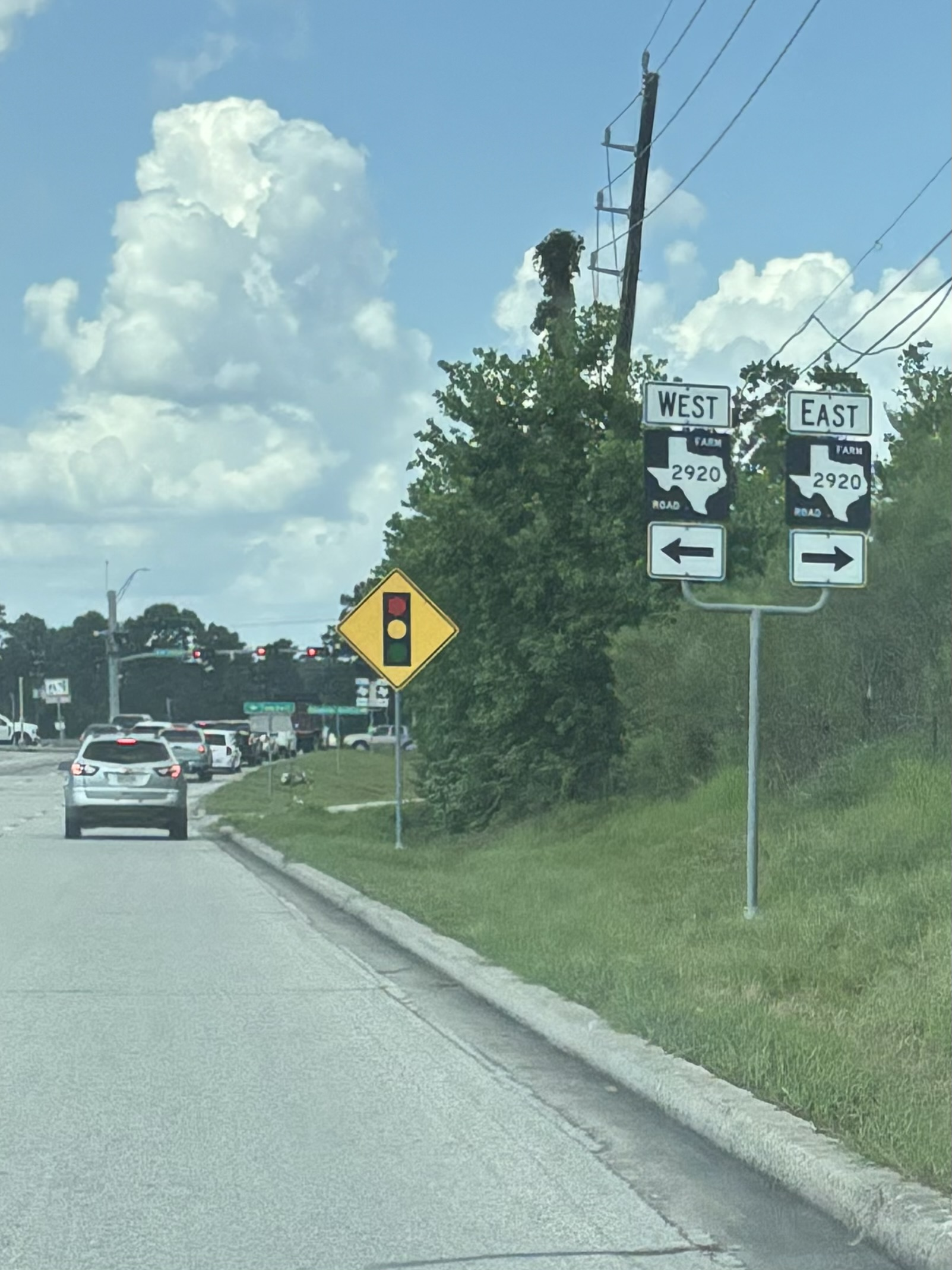
FM 2920 directional markers at junction with SH 99 near Tomball

FM 2920 was designated on May 6, 1964, on a route from US 290 (now US 290 Business) in Waller eastward to FM 149 (now SH 249 Business) in Tomball. It was extended east to I-45 on November 7, 1964.

Junction list

The entire route is in Harris County.

Location	mi	km	Destinations	Notes
Waller	0.0	0.0	Bus. US 290	Western terminus; former US 290/SH 6
Waller	0.8	1.3	US 290 / SH 6 – Austin, Houston, Navasota	
Tomball	18.8	30.3	SH 249 (Frontage Road) / Tomball Tollway – Magnolia, Houston	
Tomball	19.0	30.6	Bus. SH 249 (Tomball Parkway)	Former FM 149
Tomball	21.5	34.6	FM 2978 north – Hufsmith, The Woodlands, Conroe	
Klein	24.3	39.1	SH 99 Toll (Grand Parkway) – Tomball, New Caney	
Spring	30.8	49.6	I-45 (North Freeway) – Dallas, Houston	Eastern terminus; I-45 exit 70A
Spring	30.8	49.6	Spring-Cypress Road to Hardy Toll Road	Continuation beyond I-45
1.000 mi = 1.609 km; 1.000 km = 0.621 mi

== FM 2921 ==
Farm to Market Road 2921
- Location: Comanche and Eastland counties
- Length: 10.979 mi (17.669 km)
- Existed: January 19, 1966–present

Farm to Market Road 2921 (FM 2921) runs from SH 16 north of De Leon, northward and westward to SH 6.

=== FM 2921 (1964) ===
Farm to Market Road 2921
- Location: Colorado and Lavaca counties
- Existed: May 6, 1964–December 20, 1965

A previous route numbered FM 2921 was designated on May 6, 1964, from US 90 Alt. at Sheridan to a point 6.7 miles (10.8 km) south. On July 1, 1965, the road was extended 3.0 miles (4.8 km) south. FM 2921 was cancelled on December 20, 1965, and transferred to FM 2437.

== FM 2922 ==
Farm to Market Road 2922
- Location: Gonzales County
- Length: 5.563 mi (8.953 km)
- Existed: 1964–present

Farm to Market Road 2922 (FM 2922) runs from US 87, east of Nixon, northward to SH 97.

== FM 2923 ==
Farm to Market Road 2923
- Location: San Augustine County
- Length: 1.559 mi (2.509 km)
- Existed: October 28, 1966–present

Farm to Market Road 2923 (FM 2923) is located in San Augustine County. It runs from FM 1277, 2.3 miles (3.7 km) south of SH 103, west to Townsend Park.

FM 2923 was designated on October 28, 1966, on the current route. The entire route is also designated as Forest Highway (FH) 39.

=== FM 2923 (1964) ===
Farm to Market Road 2923
- Location: Wharton County
- Existed: May 6, 1964–May 18, 1966

A previous route numbered FM 2923 was designated on May 6, 1964, from SH 71, 2.2 miles (3.5 km) north of northern El Campo, to a point 3.3 miles (5.3 km) northeast. FM 2923 was cancelled on May 18, 1966, and became a portion of FM 2546.

== FM 2924 ==
Farm to Market Road 2924
- Location: Atascosa County
- Length: 4.139 mi (6.661 km)
- Existed: 1964–present

Farm to Market Road 2924 (FM 2924) runs from SH 184 west of Hemphill southwestward to Plainview.

== FM 2925 ==
Farm to Market Road 2925
- Location: Cameron County
- Length: 14.791 mi (23.804 km)
- Existed: November 10, 1967–present

Farm to Market Road 2925 (FM 2925) runs from FM 106 east of Rio Hondo, northward and northeastward 14.791 miles (23.804 km).

=== RM 2925 ===
Ranch to Market Road 2925
- Location: McMullen and Atascosa counties
- Existed: May 6, 1964–August 31, 1967

Ranch to Market Road 2925 (RM 2925) was designated on May 6, 1964, from SH 173 (now SH 16), 1.3 miles (2.1 km) north of Cross, east and north 6.3 miles (10.1 km) to 0.1 miles (0.16 km) north of the Atascosa County line. On June 2, 1967, the road was extended northeast 6.9 miles (11.1 km). RM 2925 was cancelled on August 31, 1967, and became a portion of FM 791.

== FM 2926 ==
Farm to Market Road 2926
- Location: Callahan County
- Length: 9.918 mi (15.961 km)
- Existed: 1964–present

Farm to Market Road 2926 (FM 2926) runs from US 283 westward to FM 604 at Oplin.

== FM 2927 ==
Farm to Market Road 2927
- Location: Shackelford County
- Existed: May 6, 1964–May 19, 1966

Farm to Market Road 2927 (FM 2927) was located in Shackelford County. No highway currently uses the FM 2927 designation.

FM 2927 was designated on May 6, 1964, from SH 351, 4 miles (6.4 km) northeast of the Jones County line, south to the Callahan County line. FM 2927 was cancelled on May 19, 1966, and became a portion of FM 604.

== FM 2928 ==
Farm to Market Road 2928
- Location: Sabine County
- Length: 4.213 mi (6.780 km)
- Existed: November 26, 1969–present

Farm to Market Road 2928 (FM 2928) runs from SH 87 northeastward to Oak Hill Cemetery.

=== FM 2928 (1964) ===
Farm to Market Road 2928
- Location: Taylor County
- Existed: May 6, 1964–August 2, 1968

A previous route numbered FM 2928 was designated on May 6, 1964, from FM 126, 1 mile (1.6 km) east of the Nolan County line, to a point 6.4 miles (10.3 km) east. On June 1, 1965, the road was extended southeast 5.2 miles (8.4 km) to US 277. FM 2928 was cancelled on August 2, 1968, and became a portion of FM 89.

== FM 2929 ==
Farm to Market Road 2929
- Location: Walker County
- Length: 4.108 mi (6.611 km)
- Existed: 1964–present

Farm to Market Road 2929 (FM 2929) runs from US 190, east of Huntsville, southeastward to FM 2296.

== FM 2930 ==
Farm to Market Road 2930
- Location: Navarro County
- Length: 6.28 mi (10.11 km)
- Existed: 1964–present

Farm to Market Road 2930 (FM 2930) runs from FM 55 northwest of Blooming Grove northeastward and southeastward to FM 1126 at Cryer Creek.

== FM 2931 ==
Farm to Market Road 2931
- Location: Denton County
- Length: 9.747 mi (15.686 km)
- Existed: 1964–present

Farm to Market Road 2931 (FM 2931) is located in Denton County.

FM 2931 begins at an intersection with US 380 between Cross Roads and Little Elm near Providence Village. The highway runs in a northern direction and turns east at Liberty Road before turning back north at Brewer Road. FM 2931 runs in a predominately northern direction and intersects FM 428 on the eastern edge of Aubrey. FM 2931 continues to run north before ending at an intersection with Friendship Road northeast of Aubrey.

FM 2931 was designated on May 6, 1964, running from FM 428 to Friendship Road at a distance of 3.4 miles (5.5 km). The highway was extended farther south to SH 24 (now US 380) on May 5, 1966. FM 2931 was extended to the west to US 377 north of Aubrey on November 3, 1972. The section of highway along Friendship Road to US 377 was cancelled on September 5, 1973, and was re-rerouted to the east, ending at FM 1385. The section of FM 2931 along Friendship Road to FM 1385 was cancelled on August 23, 1976.

== FM 2932 ==
Farm to Market Road 2932
- Location: Kaufman County
- Length: 3.595 mi (5.786 km)
- Existed: 1964–present

Farm to Market Road 2932 (FM 2932) is located in Kaufman County.

FM 2932 begins at an intersection with FM 148 southwest of Talty. The highway travels in a northwest direction and meets I-20 near Healms Trail at the Interstate's exit 491. FM 2932 turns to the west before ending at an intersection with FM 741 southeast of Forney.

FM 2932 was designated on May 6, 1964, along the current route.

== FM 2933 ==
Farm to Market Road 2933
- Location: Collin County
- Length: 7.52 mi (12.10 km)
- Existed: 1964–present

Farm to Market Road 2933 (FM 2933) is located in Collin County.

FM 2933 begins at an intersection with FM 1827 in New Hope. The highway runs in a western direction before turning north at County Road 332. FM 2933 briefly enters McKinney where it intersects County Road 331 (Woodlawn Road) before turning in a slight northeast direction. The highway zigzags before entering Melissa. FM 2933 intersects FM 545 before ending at an intersection with SH 121.

FM 2933 was designated on May 6, 1964, running from FM 1827 to FM 545. The highway was extended farther north to SH 121 on June 1, 1965.

== FM 2934 ==
Farm to Market Road 2934
- Location: Denton County
- Length: 2.81 mi (4.52 km)
- Existed: 1964–present

Farm to Market Road 2934 (FM 2934) is located in Denton County.

FM 2934 begins at an intersection with FM 423 in Little Elm. Between FM 423 and Legacy Drive, the highway passes by many newer subdivisions in northern Frisco. FM 2934 then runs near a shopping center before ending at the Dallas North Tollway. The entire route is known locally as Eldorado Parkway.

FM 2934 was designated on May 6, 1964, running from FM 423 eastward to the Denton–Collin county line. The highway was extended to the east to FM 720 on June 1, 1965. The last change came on January 31, 2002, when the section of FM 2934 between Dallas Parkway and FM 720 was removed from the highway system and turned over to the city of Frisco.

== FM 2935 ==
Farm to Market Road 2935
- Location: Washington County
- Length: 3.611 mi (5.811 km)
- Existed: May 7, 1970–present

Farm to Market Road 2935 (FM 2935) runs from a county road southward 3.611 miles (5.811 km) to FM 577, east of BS 36-J.

=== FM 2935 (1964) ===
Farm to Market Road 2935
- Location: Upshur County
- Existed: May 6, 1964–May 5, 1966

The first use of the FM 2935 designation was in Upshur County, from FM 553 (now FM 852), 0.9 miles (1.4 km) northwest of Gilmer, north and southeast to US 271 near Gilmer. FM 2935 was cancelled on May 5, 1966, and removed from the highway system, as the original proposal for that day to change FM 2935 to go from FM 553 northward 2.3 miles (3.7 km) to a road intersection was rejected by the county.

=== FM 2935 (1967) ===
Farm to Market Road 2935
- Location: Cherokee County
- Existed: June 2, 1967–October 25, 1969

The next use of the FM 2935 designation was in Cherokee County, from SH 110, 2.4 miles (3.9 km) north of Black Jack, northeast to FM 856. FM 2935 was cancelled on October 25, 1969, and removed from the highway system in exchange for the creation of FM 1089, a parallel road to the north.

== FM 2936 ==
Farm to Market Road 2936
- Location: Chambers County
- Length: 3.41 mi (5.49 km)
- Existed: 1964–present

Farm to Market Road 2936 (FM 2936) runs from FM 562 westward to old location of FM 564.

== FM 2937 ==
Farm to Market Road 2937
- Location: Hardin County
- Length: 5.815 mi (9.358 km)
- Existed: 1964–present

Farm to Market Road 2937 (FM 2937) runs from FM 92, south of the Tyler county line, southeastward to a road intersection.

== FM 2938 ==
Farm to Market Road 2938
- Location: Jasper County
- Length: 3.51 mi (5.65 km)
- Existed: 1964–present

Farm to Market Road 2938 (FM 2938) runs from SH 62, south of Buna, eastward, southward, and westward to SH 62, south of Buna.

== FM 2939 ==
Farm to Market Road 2939
- Location: Newton County
- Length: 3.793 mi (6.104 km)
- Existed: 1964–present

Farm to Market Road 2939 (FM 2939) runs from SH 87, south of Newton, westward 3.793 miles (6.104 km).

== FM 2940 ==
Farm to Market Road 2940
- Location: Brown County
- Length: 5.696 mi (9.167 km)
- Existed: 1964–present

Farm to Market Road 2940 (FM 2940) runs from SH 279 in Cross Cut eastward to FM 583.

== FM 2941 ==
Farm to Market Road 2941
- Location: Dickens County
- Length: 4.241 mi (6.825 km)
- Existed: 1964–present

Farm to Market Road 2941 (FM 2941) runs from US 82, east of Dickens northward to a county road.

== FM 2942 ==
Farm to Market Road 2942
- Location: Lampasas County
- Length: 6.385 mi (10.276 km)
- Existed: 1964–present

Farm to Market Road 2942 (FM 2942) runs from US 183 in Lometa northward to a road intersection.

== FM 2943 ==
Farm to Market Road 2943
- Location: Castro and Deaf Smith counties
- Length: 17.104 mi (27.526 km)
- Existed: August 31, 1968–present

Farm to Market Road 2943 (FM 2943) runs from US 385 northward to US 60 northeast of Hereford; and from another point on US 60, northward to FM 1062.

=== FM 2943 (1964) ===
Farm to Market Road 2943
- Location: Bowie County
- Existed: June 22, 1964–May 26, 1966

A previous route numbered FM 2943 was designated on June 22, 1964, from US 67, west of Akin Creek, southeast to US 59, south of Akin Creek. FM 2943 was cancelled on May 26, 1966, and became a portion of FM 2148.

== FM 2944 ==
Farm to Market Road 2944
- Location: Donley County
- Length: 5.524 mi (8.890 km)
- Existed: 1964–present

Farm to Market Road 2944 (FM 2944) runs from SH 203 east of Hedley northward and westward to RM 2695. It was originally Ranch to Market Road 2944 (RM 2944).

== FM 2945 ==
Farm to Market Road 2945
- Location: Callahan and Eastland counties
- Length: 10.731 mi (17.270 km)
- Existed: October 30, 1964–present

Farm to Market Road 2945 (FM 2945) is a road that runs from just east of Putnam to Cisco along the former route of U.S. Highway 80.

FM 2945 was designated on October 30, 1964, on the current route.

== FM 2946 ==
Farm to Market Road 2946
- Location: Rains County
- Length: 5.941 mi (9.561 km)
- Existed: 1964–present

Farm to Market Road 2946 (FM 2946) runs from FM 514 near the Wood County Line, southward to FM 515; and from another point on FM 515, southward to FM 2795.

== FM 2947 ==
Farm to Market Road 2947
- Location: Hunt County
- Length: 5.752 mi (9.257 km)
- Existed: 1965–present

Farm to Market Road 2947 (FM 2947) runs from US 69, west of the Sabine River, southward and westward to FM 2101.

== FM 2948 ==
Farm to Market Road 2948
- Location: Hopkins County
- Length: 4.425 mi (7.121 km)
- Existed: 1965–present

Farm to Market Road 2948 (FM 2948) runs from FM 1567, east of Reilly Springs, southward and eastward to FM 69.

== FM 2949 ==
Farm to Market Road 2949
- Location: Delta County
- Length: 5.921 mi (9.529 km)
- Existed: 1965–present

Farm to Market Road 2949 (FM 2949) runs from FM 128 eastward and southward to FM 198 in Enloe; and from another point on FM 198 at Enloe, southward to SH 24.

== FM 2950 ==
Farm to Market Road 2950
- Location: Jack County
- Length: 4.116 mi (6.624 km)
- Existed: 1965–present

Farm to Market Road 2950 (FM 2950) runs from SH 114, west of Jermyn, northward to a county road.

== FM 2951 ==
Farm to Market Road 2951
- Location: Palo Pinto County
- Length: 3.727 mi (5.998 km)
- Existed: 1965–present

Farm to Market Road 2951 (FM 2951) runs from Park Road 36 southwestward to near Sandy Point Beach at Possum Kingdom Lake.

== FM 2952 ==
Farm to Market Road 2952
- Location: Wise County
- Length: 6.262 mi (10.078 km)
- Existed: 1965–present

Farm to Market Road 2952 (FM 2952) runs from FM 1810, west of Chico, southward to FM 1658.

== FM 2953 ==
Farm to Market Road 2953
- Location: Montague County
- Length: 11.03 mi (17.75 km)
- Existed: June 1, 1965–present

Farm to Market Road 2953 (FM 2953) runs from FM 2634 west of Lake Nocona east to FM 677 near Illinois Bend in northern Montague County. The highway parallels the Red River and meets the eastern end of FM 103 northeast of Lake Nocona. FM 2953 was designated on June 1, 1965, from what was then FM 2634 3 miles (4.8 km) east of FM 103 eastward about 4.8 miles (7.7 km). The highway was extended in both directions to its present termini on February 20, 1989.

== FM 2954 ==
Farm to Market Road 2954
- Location: Robertson County
- Length: 8.738 mi (14.062 km)
- Existed: May 7, 1970–present

Farm to Market Road 2954 (FM 2954) runs from FM 2293 in Bremond, eastward 8.738 miles (14.062 km).

=== FM 2954 (1965) ===
Farm to Market Road 2954
- Location: Reeves County
- Existed: June 1, 1965–August 2, 1968

A previous route numbered FM 2954 was designated on June 1, 1965, from US 290 in Balmorhea to a point 4.2 miles (6.8 km) north. FM 2954 was cancelled on August 2, 1968, and became a portion of FM 2903.

== FM 2955 ==
Farm to Market Road 2955
- Location: Coryell County
- Length: 4.449 mi (7.160 km)
- Existed: 1965–present

Farm to Market Road 2955 (FM 2955) runs from FM 217 in Pancake southwestward to SH 36.

== FM 2956 ==
Farm to Market Road 2956
- Location: Lynn County
- Length: 10.045 mi (16.166 km)
- Existed: 1965–present

Farm to Market Road 2956 (FM 2956) runs from US 380, east of Tahoka, southward to FM 213.

== FM 2957 ==
Farm to Market Road 2957
- Location: McLennan County
- Length: 8.852 mi (14.246 km)
- Existed: 1965–present

Farm to Market Road 2957 (FM 2957) runs from FM 2491, east of Waco, southeastward to FM 939.

== FM 2958 ==
Farm to Market Road 2958
- Location: Falls County
- Length: 3.409 mi (5.486 km)
- Existed: 1965–present

Farm to Market Road 2958 (FM 2958) runs from SH 7, east of Marlin, southeastward 3.409 miles (5.486 km).

== FM 2959 ==
Farm to Market Road 2959
- Location: Hill County
- Length: 6.987 mi (11.244 km)
- Existed: 1965–present

Farm to Market Road 2959 (FM 2959) runs from US 81 at Lovelace, northeastward and southeastward via Loveview to US 77.

== FM 2960 ==
Farm to Market Road 2960
- Location: Hill County
- Length: 2.29 mi (3.69 km)
- Existed: 1965–present

Farm to Market Road 2960 (FM 2960) runs from SH 22, south of Whitney, southward to a road intersection.

== FM 2961 ==
Farm to Market Road 2961
- Location: Anderson County
- Length: 9.448 mi (15.205 km)
- Existed: 1965–present

Farm to Market Road 2961 (FM 2961) runs from FM 59 near Cayuga, eastward to FM 837 near Springfield.

== FM 2962 ==
Farm to Market Road 2962
- Location: Cherokee County
- Length: 3.463 mi (5.573 km)
- Existed: 1965–present

Farm to Market Road 2962 (FM 2962) runs from US 84, southwest of Reklaw, southward to Circle.

== FM 2963 ==
Farm to Market Road 2963
- Location: Gregg County
- Length: 2.260 mi (3.637 km)
- Existed: June 1, 1965–present

Farm to Market Road 2963 (FM 2963) is located in Gregg County. It runs from FM 349 near Lakeport southeast to Cherokee Trail at Lake Cherokee.

FM 2963 was designated on June 1, 1965, along the current route.

== FM 2964 ==
Farm to Market Road 2964
- Location: Smith County
- Length: 5.058 mi (8.140 km)
- Existed: 1965–present

Farm to Market Road 2964 (FM 2964) is located in Smith County.

FM 2964 begins at an intersection with FM 346 near Whitehouse. The highway travels in a mostly northern direction through a semi-suburban area, crosses over the Loop 49 toll road, then enters Tyler near Grande Boulevard. In Tyler, FM 2964 is known locally as Rhones Quarter Road and travels through a residential area, turns east at Shiloh Road, ending at an intersection with SH 110.

FM 2964 was designated on June 1, 1965, along the current route. On June 27, 1995, the route was redesignated Urban Road 2964 (UR 2964). The designation reverted to FM 2964 with the elimination of the Urban Road system on November 15, 2018.

== FM 2965 ==
Farm to Market Road 2965
- Location: Van Zandt and Kaufman counties
- Length: 6.857 mi (11.035 km)
- Existed: 1965–present

Farm to Market Road 2965 (FM 2965) is located in Van Zandt and Kaufman counties.

FM 2965 begins at an intersection with Hiram Road in the Locust Grove area. The highway travels in a northeast direction through rural farming areas, has a junction with I-20 at the Interstate's exit 512, then ends at an intersection with US 80 in Wills Point.

FM 2965 was designated on June 1, 1965, running from US 80 to I-20 at a distance of 5.9 miles (9.5 km). The highway was extended 1.1 miles (1.8 km) to Hiram Road on May 5, 1966.

== FM 2966 ==
Farm to Market Road 2966
- Location: Wood County
- Length: 16.419 mi (26.424 km)
- Existed: 1965–present

Farm to Market Road 2966 (FM 2966) runs from SH 154 in Yantis eastward and southward to Loop 173 in Quitman.

== FM 2967 ==
Farm to Market Road 2967
- Location: Houston County
- Length: 2.817 mi (4.534 km)
- Existed: 1965–present

Farm to Market Road 2967 (FM 2967) runs from FM 132 at Porter Springs, southeastward to SH 21.

== FM 2968 ==
Farm to Market Road 2968
- Location: Houston County
- Length: 1.435 mi (2.309 km)
- Existed: 1965–present

Farm to Market Road 2968 (FM 2968) runs from FM 1272, northwest of Grapeland, northwestward to a road intersection.

== FM 2969 ==
Farm to Market Road 2969
- Location: Polk County
- Length: 2.614 mi (4.207 km)
- Existed: 1965–present

Farm to Market Road 2969 (FM 2969) runs from FM 1988, west of Goodrich, southwestward 2.614 miles (4.207 km).

== RM 2970 ==
Ranch to Market Road 2970
- Location: Henderson County
- Length: 2.746 mi (4.419 km)
- Existed: June 2, 1967–present

Ranch to Market Road 2970 (RM 2970) is located in Henderson County near Athens.

RM 2970 begins at County Road 1116 with the road continuing south as County Road 1113. The highway travels in a slight northeast direction through a heavily forested area and passes the Clements Scout Ranch. RM 2970 turns more towards the northeast before turning north. The highway turns northwest near County Road 1108 before ending at an intersection with FM 753. All of RM 2970 has no shoulder with a speed limit of 70 miles per hour (110 km/h).

RM 2970 was designated on June 2, 1967, along the current route.

=== FM 2970 ===
Farm to Market Road 2970
- Location: Polk County
- Existed: June 1, 1965–May 18, 1966

RM 2970 was first designated as FM 2970 on June 1, 1965. The highway ran from FM 943 near Segno in Polk County to a point 2.5 miles (4.0 km) to the south. On May 18, 1966, FM 2970 was cancelled and combined with FM 2798.

== FM 2971 ==
Farm to Market Road 2971
- Location: Sabine County
- Length: 2.677 mi (4.308 km)
- Existed: 1965–present

Farm to Market Road 2971 (FM 2971) runs from FM 83 in Hemphill, west of SH 87, southwestward 2.677 miles (4.308 km).

== FM 2972 ==
Farm to Market Road 2972
- Location: Cherokee County
- Length: 3.67 mi (5.91 km)
- Existed: May 7, 1970–present

Farm to Market Road 2972 (FM 2972) is located in Cherokee County. Its western terminus is at FM 347 south of Dialville. FM 2972 runs east to Rusk, intersecting FM 343 and passing the Texas Department of Criminal Justice's Hodge Unit, before ending at US 69.

FM 2972 was designated on May 7, 1970, along the current route.

=== FM 2972 (1965) ===
Farm to Market Road 2972
- Location: San Jacinto County
- Existed: June 1, 1965–December 12, 1969

A previous route numbered FM 2972 was designated in San Jacinto County on June 1, 1965, running from Shepherd northward 0.7 miles (1.1 km). The route was extended northward by 1.2 miles (1.9 km) on July 11, 1968. FM 2972 was cancelled on December 12, 1969, and combined with FM 222.

== FM 2973 ==
Farm to Market Road 2973
- Location: San Jacinto
- Length: 1.322 mi (2.128 km)
- Existed: 1965–present

Farm to Market Road 2973 (FM 2973) runs from FM 1514 in Coldspring southeastward to SH 150.

== FM 2974 ==
Farm to Market Road 2974
- Location: Shelby County
- Length: 2.080 mi (3.347 km)
- Existed: June 1, 1965–present

Farm to Market Road 2974 (FM 2974) is a 2.080-mile (3.347 km) state road in Shelby County that connects the east end of Shelby County Road 1211 in Lamar (at the New Hope Cemetery) with Farm to Market Road 138 in Center.

== FM 2975 ==
Farm to Market Road 2975
- Location: Shelby County
- Length: 1.384 mi (2.227 km)
- Existed: 1965–present

Farm to Market Road 2975 (FM 2975) runs from FM 417, southwest of SH 87, southward approx. 1.384 miles (2.227 km).

== FM 2976 ==
Farm to Market Road 2976
- Location: Haskell County
- Length: 2.898 mi (4.664 km)
- Existed: June 2, 1967–present

Farm to Market Road 2976 (FM 2976) runs from FM 600 south of Paint Creek Lake (Lake Stamford), northeastward to Stamford Park.

=== FM 2976 (1965) ===
Farm to Market Road 2976
- Location: Trinity County
- Existed: June 1, 1965–May 23, 1966

A previous route numbered FM 2976 was designated on June 1, 1965, from FM 358, 1.2 miles (1.9 km) northwest of SH 94, to a point 2.4 miles (3.9 km) north. FM 2976 was cancelled on May 23, 1966, and became a portion of FM 233.

== FM 2977 ==
Farm to Market Road 2977
- Location: Fort Bend County
- Length: 7.839 mi (12.616 km)
- Existed: June 1, 1965–present

Farm to Market Road 2977 (FM 2977) is located in Fort Bend County. The highway begins at FM 361 near Fairchilds, goes generally to the northeast and ends at FM 762 a short distance from U.S. Highway 59 (US 59) in Rosenberg. The highway is also named Minonite Road.

FM 2977 starts as a two-lane rural road at a stop sign on FM 361 northwest of Fairchilds in Fort Bend County. From the intersection, the highway goes northeast 3.4 miles (5.5 km) to Powerline Road where it curves more toward the north. In this stretch the highway crosses Big Creek. On the east side of the road near Powerline Road is the Big Creek Oil Field. FM 2977 continues north-northeast for 2.6 miles (4.2 km) to Ricefield Road where it veers to the northeast again. FM 2977 continues straight for 1.9 miles (3.1 km) before crossing the BNSF Railway tracks and terminating at a traffic signal at FM 762 in Rosenberg. After Ricefield Road, the highway passes the Walnut Creek subdivision and the aspect becomes less rural. There is a traffic signal at Reading Road, 0.4 miles (0.64 km) southwest of FM 762. Reading Road and two other streets connect FM 2977 to a large shopping center 250 yards (229 m) to the west at FM 762 and US 59.

FM 2977 was originally designated on June 1, 1965, to go from FM 361 to the northeast about 3.4 miles (5.5 km). The highway was extended an additional 4.4 miles (7.1 km) to FM 762 on July 11, 1968.

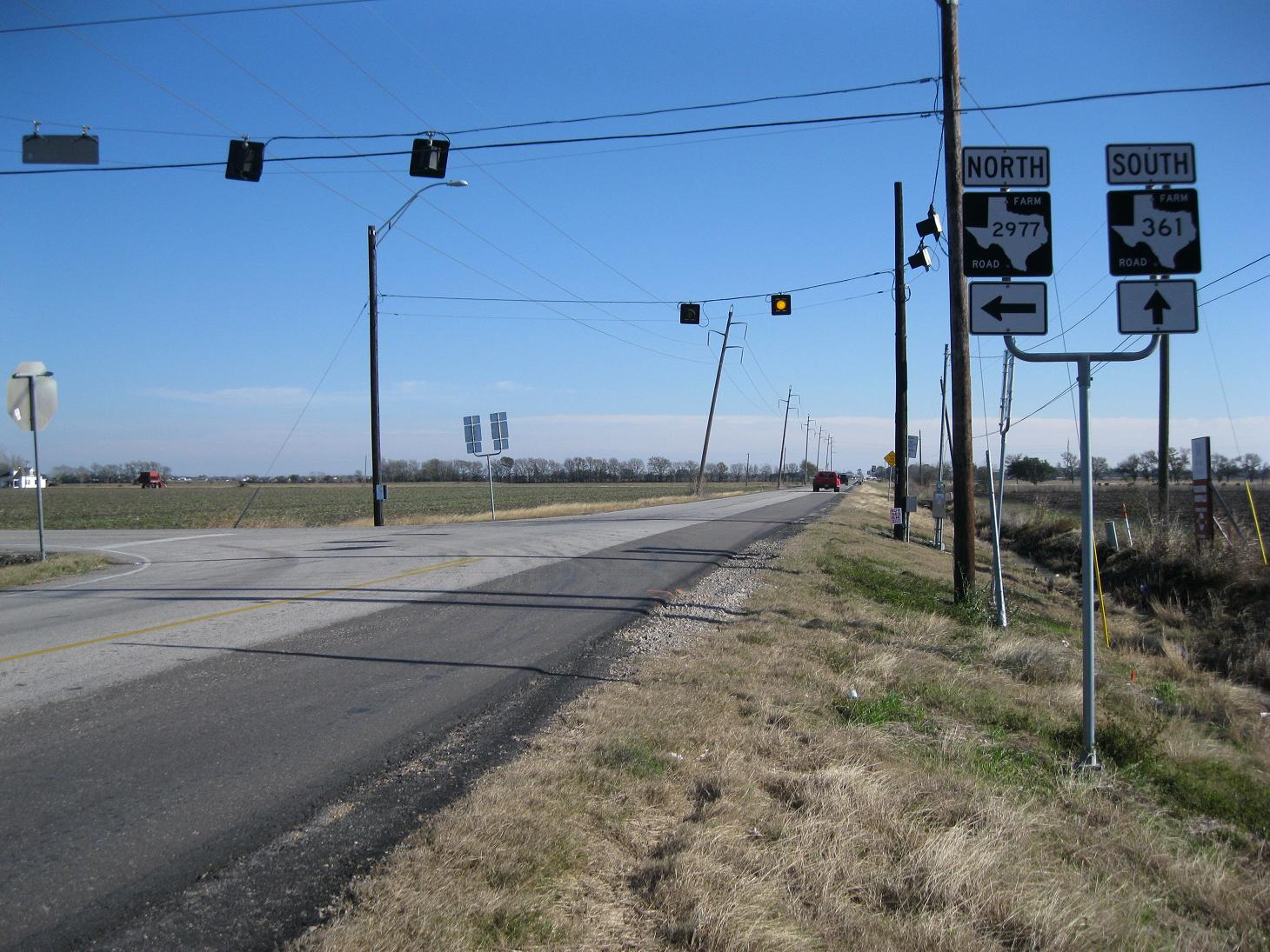
Southwest end of FM 2977 at FM 361 near Fairchilds

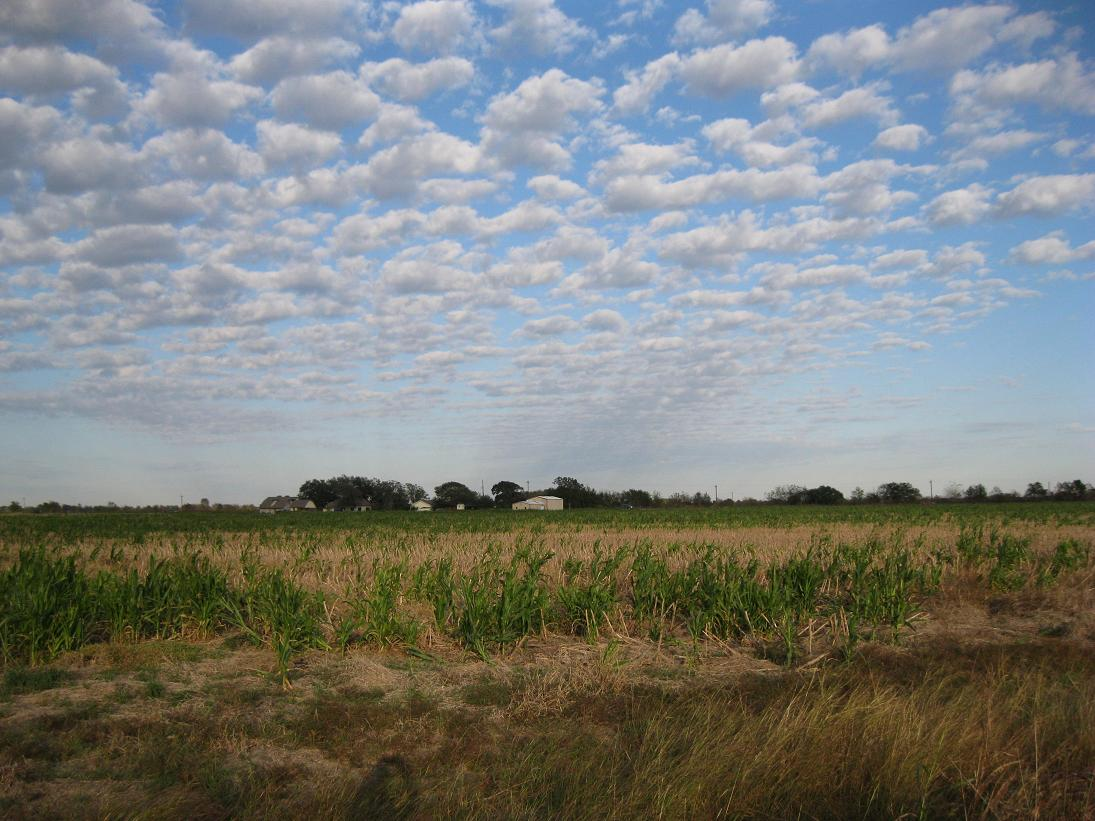
View from Powerline Road near FM 2977

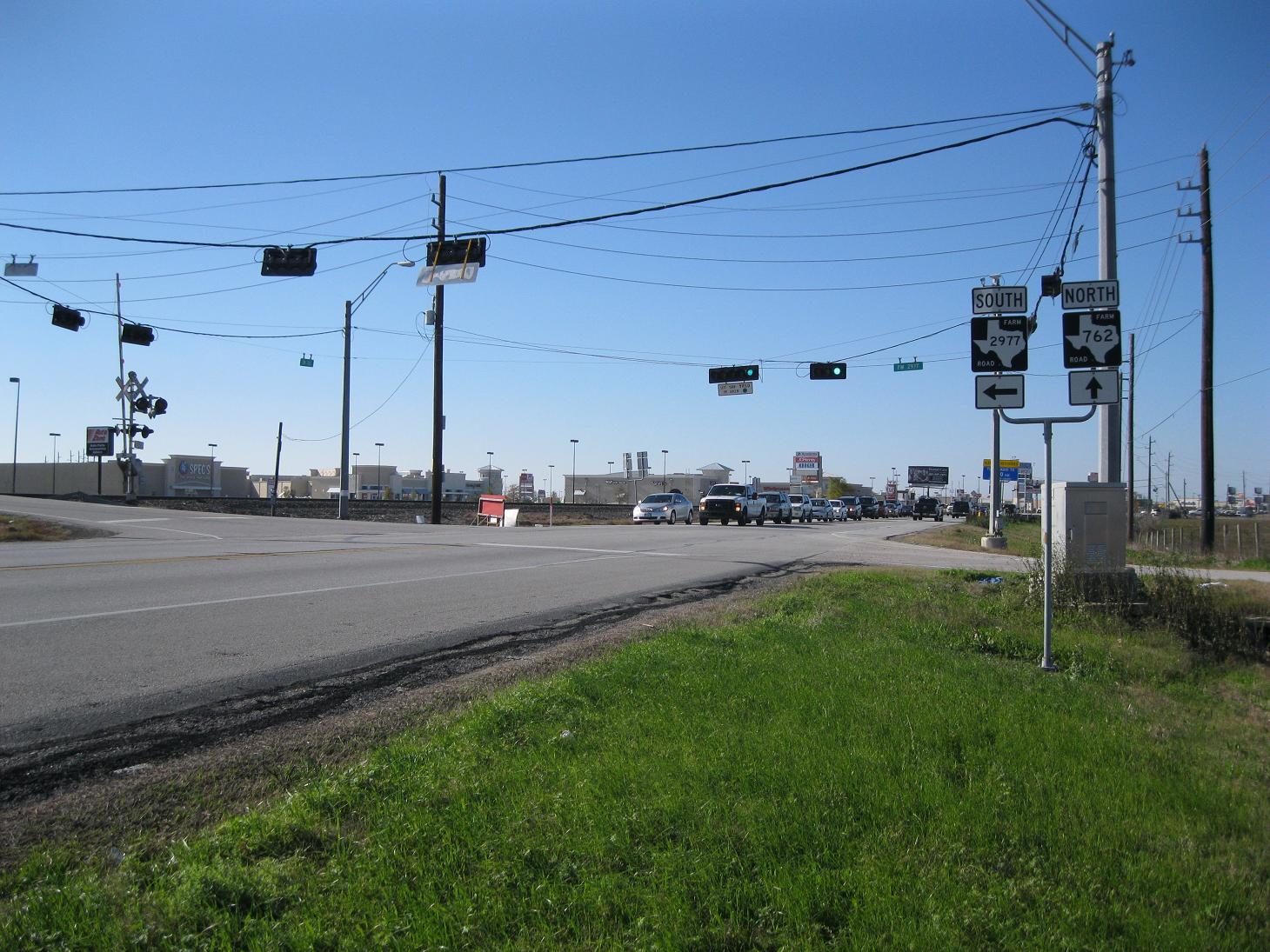
Northeast end of FM 2977 at FM 762 in Rosenberg

== FM 2978 ==
Farm to Market Road 2978
- Location: Harris and Montgomery counties
- Length: 9.161 mi (14.743 km)
- Existed: June 1, 1965–present

Farm to Market Road 2978 (FM 2978) is located in Harris and Montgomery counties.

The southern terminus of FM 2978 is at FM 2920 just east of the Tomball city limits. The road travels north along Hufsmith–Kohrville Road, through the community of Hufsmith, north of which it mostly travels along Hufsmith-Conroe Road, and along the western boundary of The Woodlands. The northern terminus is at FM 1488 near the unincorporated community of Egypt.

FM 2978 was designated on June 1, 1965, along the current route.

Junctions

County	Location	mi	km	Destinations	Notes
Harris		0.0	0.0	Hufsmith-Kohrville Road	Continuation beyond FM 2920
Harris		0.0	0.0	FM 2920 (East Main Street) – Tomball, Spring	Southern terminus
Harris		1.1	1.8	Hufsmith-Kuykendahl Road	Interchange
Montgomery		6.3	10.1	Woodtrace Boulevard to SH 249	Proposed intersection; to provide access to SH 249
Montgomery		6.7	10.8	Woodlands Parkway – The Woodlands	
Montgomery		9.2	14.8	FM 1488 (Magnolia Parkway) – Magnolia, Conroe	Northern terminus
Montgomery		9.2	14.8	Honea-Egypt Road	Continuation beyond FM 1488
Montgomery	1.000 mi = 1.609 km; 1.000 km = 0.621 mi				

== FM 2979 ==
Farm to Market Road 2979
- Location: Waller County
- Length: 7.698 mi (12.389 km)
- Existed: 1965–present

Farm to Market Road 2979 (FM 2979) runs from SH 6, south of Grimes county line, eastward to FM 362.

== FM 2980 ==
Farm to Market Road 2980
- Location: DeWitt County
- Length: 5.835 mi (9.391 km)
- Existed: 1965–present

Farm to Market Road 2980 (FM 2980) runs from northwest of Yorktown, southeastward and southward across SH 72 to Smith Creek.

== FM 2981 ==
Farm to Market Road 2981
- Location: Fayette County
- Length: 5.422 mi (8.726 km)
- Existed: 1965–present

Farm to Market Road 2981 (FM 2981) runs from SH 159, northeast of Rutersville, northwestward to FM 2145.

== FM 2982 ==
Farm to Market Road 2982
- Location: Jackson County
- Length: 2.446 mi (3.936 km)
- Existed: 1965–present

Farm to Market Road 2982 (FM 2982) runs from Loop 522, west of Ganado, southward 2.446 miles (3.936 km).

== FM 2983 ==
Farm to Market Road 2983
- Location: Harrison County
- Length: 1.585 mi (2.551 km)
- Existed: October 5, 1972–present

Farm to Market Road 2983 (FM 2983) is located in Harrison County. It runs from US 59 northward approximately 1.5 miles (2.4 km) to FM 2625.

FM 2983 was designated on October 5, 1972, along the current route. It is a former alignment of US 59.

=== FM 2983 (1965) ===
Farm to Market Road 2983
- Location: Williamson County
- Existed: June 1, 1965–June 6, 1967

A previous route numbered FM 2983 was designated in Williamson County on June 1, 1965, from SH 95 in Granger westward 5 miles (8 km) to a road intersection. This route was cancelled on June 6, 1967, and became a portion of FM 971.

== FM 2984 ==
Farm to Market Road 2984
- Location: Caldwell County
- Length: 6.035 mi (9.712 km)
- Existed: 1965–present

Farm to Market Road 2984 (FM 2984) runs from FM 671 in Joliet, southward to US 183 in Luling.

== FM 2985 ==
Farm to Market Road 2985
- Location: Bee and Karnes counties
- Length: 6.284 mi (10.113 km)
- Existed: 1965–present

Farm to Market Road 2985 (FM 2985) runs from FM 798 near Caesar, northwestward via Monteola to SH 72.

== FM 2986 ==
Farm to Market Road 2986
- Location: San Patricio County
- Length: 4.025 mi (6.478 km)
- Existed: 1965–present

Farm to Market Road 2986 (FM 2986) runs from US 181, northwest of Gregory, southward to Portland.

== FM 2987 ==
Farm to Market Road 2987
- Location: Goliad County
- Length: 4.742 mi (7.632 km)
- Existed: 1965–present

Farm to Market Road 2987 (FM 2987) runs from SH 59 near Fannin, northward 4.742 miles (7.632 km).

== FM 2988 ==
Farm to Market Road 2988
- Location: Grimes County
- Length: 4.713 mi (7.585 km)
- Existed: 1965–present

Farm to Market Road 2988 (FM 2988) runs from SH 6 southeast of Navasota, eastward to FM 362 at White Hall.

== FM 2989 ==
Farm to Market Road 2989
- Location: Walker County
- Length: 6.038 mi (9.717 km)
- Existed: 1965–present

Farm to Market Road 2989 (FM 2989) runs from US 75, northwest of Mossy Grove, eastward to FM 247.

== FM 2990 ==
Farm to Market Road 2990
- Location: Fannin County
- Length: 6.036 mi (9.714 km)
- Existed: January 31, 1967–present

Farm to Market Road 2990 (FM 2990) runs from FM 1550 southeastward to SH 34 at Ladonia.

=== FM 2990 (1965) ===
Farm to Market Road 2990
- Location: Chambers County
- Existed: June 1, 1965–May 25, 1966

A previous route numbered FM 2990 was designated on June 1, 1965, from I-10 and Spur 5 (now FM 1663) north and west 3.8 miles (6.1 km) to a county road. FM 2990 was cancelled on May 25, 1966, and became a portion of FM 1663.

== FM 2991 ==
Farm to Market Road 2991
- Location: Newton County
- Length: 4.99 mi (8.03 km)
- Existed: 1965–present

Farm to Market Road 2991 (FM 2991) runs from SH 63, northeast of Burkeville, southward to FM 1414.

== FM 2992 ==
Farm to Market Road 2992
- Location: Tyler County
- Length: 6.74 mi (10.85 km)
- Existed: 1965–present

Farm to Market Road 2992 (FM 2992) runs from FM 1746, west of FM 92, southward to FM 1013.

== FM 2993 ==
Farm to Market Road 2993
- Location: Hidalgo County
- Length: 2.98 mi (4.80 km)
- Existed: 1965–present

Farm to Market Road 2993 (FM 2993) runs from SH 107 and FM 681 northward to FM 1925.

== FM 2994 ==
Farm to Market Road 2994
- Location: Cameron County
- Length: 4.09 mi (6.58 km)
- Existed: 1965–present

Farm to Market Road 2994 (FM 2994) runs from FM 800 eastward to I-69E/US 77.

== RM 2995 ==
Ranch to Market Road 2995
- Location: Edwards County
- Length: 9.372 mi (15.083 km)
- Existed: 1965–present

Ranch to Market Road 2995 (RM 2995) runs from SH 55, northwest of Rocksprings, northwestward 9.372 miles (15.083 km).

== FM 2996 ==
Farm to Market Road 2996
- Location: McCulloch County
- Length: 4.149 mi (6.677 km)
- Existed: 1965–present

Farm to Market Road 2996 (FM 2996) runs from FM 1121 southward to US 377 north of Brady.

== FM 2997 ==
Farm to Market Road 2997
- Location: San Saba County
- Length: 11.351 mi (18.268 km)
- Existed: 1965–present

Farm to Market Road 2997 (FM 2997) runs from FM 45, north of Richland Springs, westward and southward to US 190.

== FM 2998 ==
Farm to Market Road 2998
- Location: Cottle County
- Length: 4.37 mi (7.03 km)
- Existed: 1965–present

Farm to Market Road 2998 (FM 2998) runs from US 83 at Dunlap, eastward, southward, and westward to US 83, south of Dunlap.

== FM 2999 ==
Farm to Market Road 2999
- Location: Motley County
- Length: 3.603 mi (5.798 km)
- Existed: 1965–present

Farm to Market Road 2999 (FM 2999) runs from SH 70, south of Whiteflat, westward to a road intersection.
