= Interstate 10 in Texas =

Section of Interstate Highway in Texas, United States

Interstate 10
- I-10 highlighted in red

Route information
- Maintained by TxDOT
- Length: 877.455 mi (Note: The certified mileage given is shorter than the actual mileage as TxDOT considers I-10 to be discontinuous at rather than concurrent with I-35 in San Antonio.) (1,412.127 km)
- Existed: 1959–present
- NHS: Entire route

Major junctions
- West end: I-10 / US 85 / US 180 at the New Mexico state line in Anthony
- US 54 / US 62 / I-110 in El Paso; I-20 in Reeves County; I-35 in San Antonio; I-37 / US 281 in San Antonio; I-45 in Houston; I-69 / US 59 in Houston
- East end: I-10 / US 90 at the Louisiana state line in Orange

Location
- Country: United States
- State: Texas
- Counties: El Paso, Hudspeth, Culberson, Jeff Davis, Reeves, Pecos, Crockett, Sutton, Kimble, Gillespie, Kerr, Kendall, Bexar, Guadalupe, Caldwell, Gonzales, Fayette, Colorado, Austin, Waller, Fort Bend, Harris, Chambers, Jefferson, Orange

Highway system
- Interstate Highway System; Main; Auxiliary; Suffixed; Business; Future; Highways in Texas; Interstate; US; State; Former; Toll; Loops; Spurs; FM/RM; Park; Rec
← RE 9	→ SH 10

Interstate 10 (I-10 (Note: Some sources use "IH-10", as "IH" is an abbreviation used by the Texas Department of Transportation for Interstate Highways.)) is the major east–west Interstate Highway in the Southern United States. In the U.S. state of Texas, it runs east from Anthony, at the border with New Mexico, through El Paso, San Antonio, and Houston to the border with Louisiana in Orange. At just under 880 miles (1,420 kilometers), the Texas segment of I-10, maintained by the Texas Department of Transportation, is the longest continuous untolled freeway in North America that is operated by a single authority. It is also the longest stretch of Interstate Highway with a single designation within a single state. (Note: U.S. Highway 83 is about 10 mi (16 km) longer than I-10 within Texas.) Mile marker 880 and its corresponding exit number in Orange, Texas, are the highest-numbered mile marker and exit on any freeway in North America. Since widening was completed in 2008, a portion of the highway west of Houston is now also believed to be the widest in the world, at 26 lanes when including feeders.

More than a third of I-10's length is located in Texas alone. El Paso, near the New Mexico state line, is 785 mi (1,263 km) from the western terminus of I-10 in Santa Monica, California, making it closer to Los Angeles than it is to Orange, Texas, 857 mi (1,379 km) away at the Louisiana state line. Likewise, Orange is only 789 mi (1,270 km) from the eastern terminus of I-10 in Jacksonville, Florida.

== Route description ==
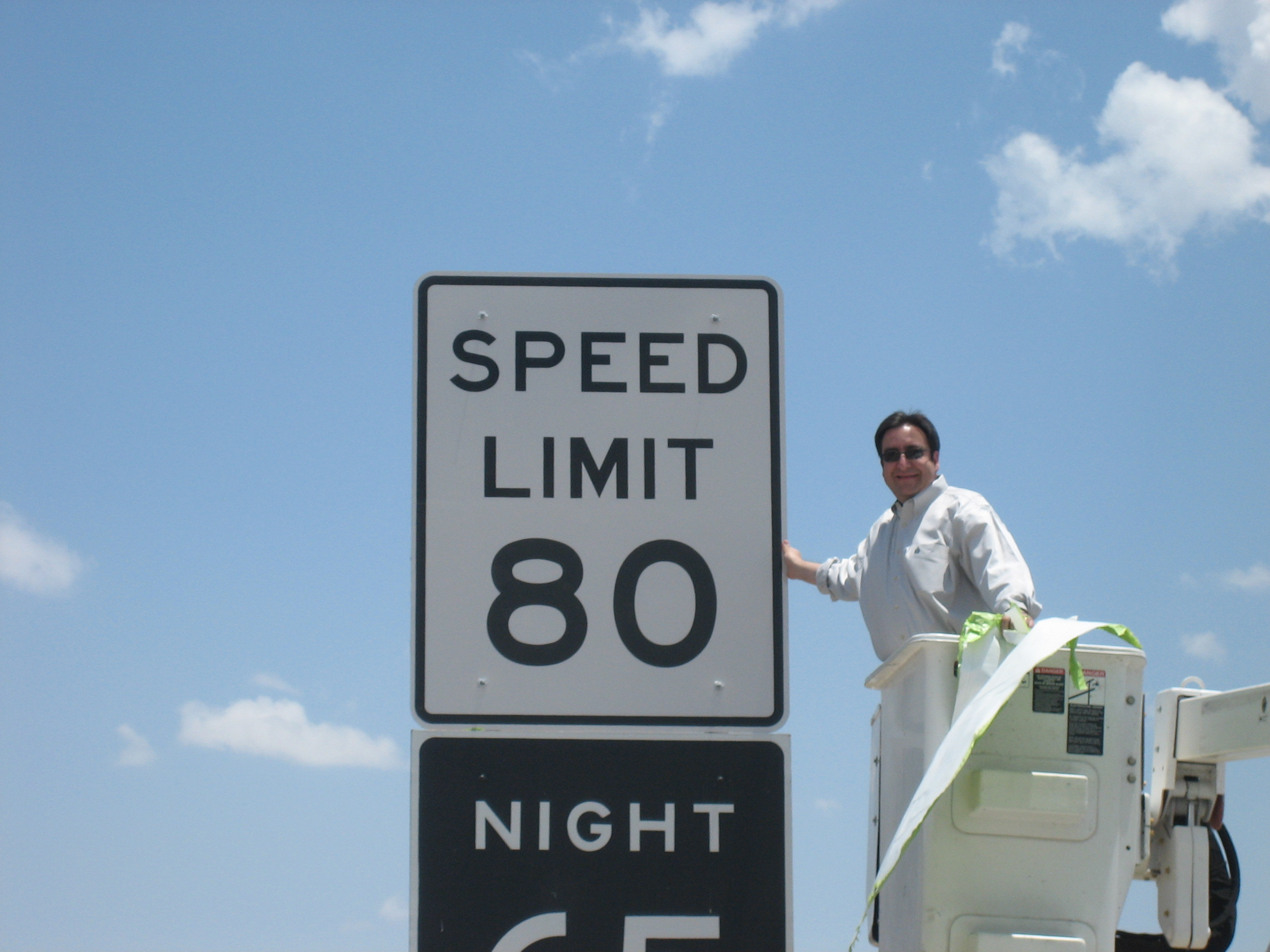
Texas State Rep. Pete Gallego unveiling a new 80 mph (130 km/h) speed limit sign on I-10 near Fort Stockton

=== West Texas ===
I-10 enters Texas northwest of El Paso near Anthony and runs southward, alongside US Route 85 (US 85) and US 180. US 85 splits off in West El Paso at exit 13 (Sunland Park Drive, Paisano Drive), where US 85 heads south on Paisano Drive, through downtown El Paso, and ends at the Stanton Street Bridge and the border with Mexico via local streets. As of the summer of 2016, the stretch of I-10 that runs through El Paso was in the midst of a major construction project, which sought to link North/South Desert Boulevard (the westside frontage roads) with Gateway East and Gateway West (the central and eastside frontage roads). Several miles of frontage road were being built where none previously existed. I-10/US 180 continues turning to the east towards downtown El Paso. I-10 then meets I-110 and US 54 (the "Patriot Freeway", or North–South Freeway) in a complex, three-level interchange referred to by locals as the "Spaghetti Bowl". I-10 and US 180 diverge east of downtown at exit 23B (Paisano Drive) as US 180 heads northeast (joining US 62 and Paisano Drive northbound) and I-10 to the southeast. I-10's frontage-road system is called Desert Boulevard where it runs through West El Paso, and Gateway Boulevard where it runs through Central and East El Paso. Among these stretches of the highway. Gateway East Boulevard is the longest, extending continuously for roughly 22 mi (35 km). Continuing towards Tornillo and Fabens, I-10 turns to the southeast and runs alongside the Rio Grande and the Mexican border for approximately 60 mi (97 km).

Where I-10 leaves the Rio Grande, it runs primarily eastward. Just before entering the city of Van Horn, at the border of Hudspeth and Culberson counties, I-10 leaves the Mountain Time Zone and enters the Central Time Zone. Just east of Kent, the western terminus of I-20 intersects with I-10. I-20 heads northeast towards the Dallas–Fort Worth area, and I-10 continues to run eastward. US 67 runs alongside I-10 for a stretch; La Entrada al Pacifico trade corridor is a part of this stretch of I-10. Near Junction, I-10 begins a more southeastwardly course as it runs toward the San Antonio metropolitan area. Near Comfort, I-10 and US 87 begin to run alongside each other until they reach San Antonio.

Because I-10 crosses some of the most rural and sparsely inhabited parts of the United States, notably the Trans-Pecos Region, it has several unique features that differentiate it from other interstate highways. I-10 is one of the very few interstates that has exceptions in Interstate Highway Standards where there are at-grade intersections (roads that intersect it at a 90-degree angle, rather than crossing via an overpass or underpass with on and off ramps). These are private-access roads (mostly from large ranches), and are found over a limited stretch in western Texas. These are also found on I-40 in the Texas Panhandle.

The stretch from Kerr County to El Paso County has an 80-mile-per-hour (130 km/h) speed limit, which was the highest in the nation until the opening of the 85-mile-per-hour (137 km/h) southern section of Texas State Highway 130 (SH 130) on October 24, 2012.

=== San Antonio and Central Texas ===
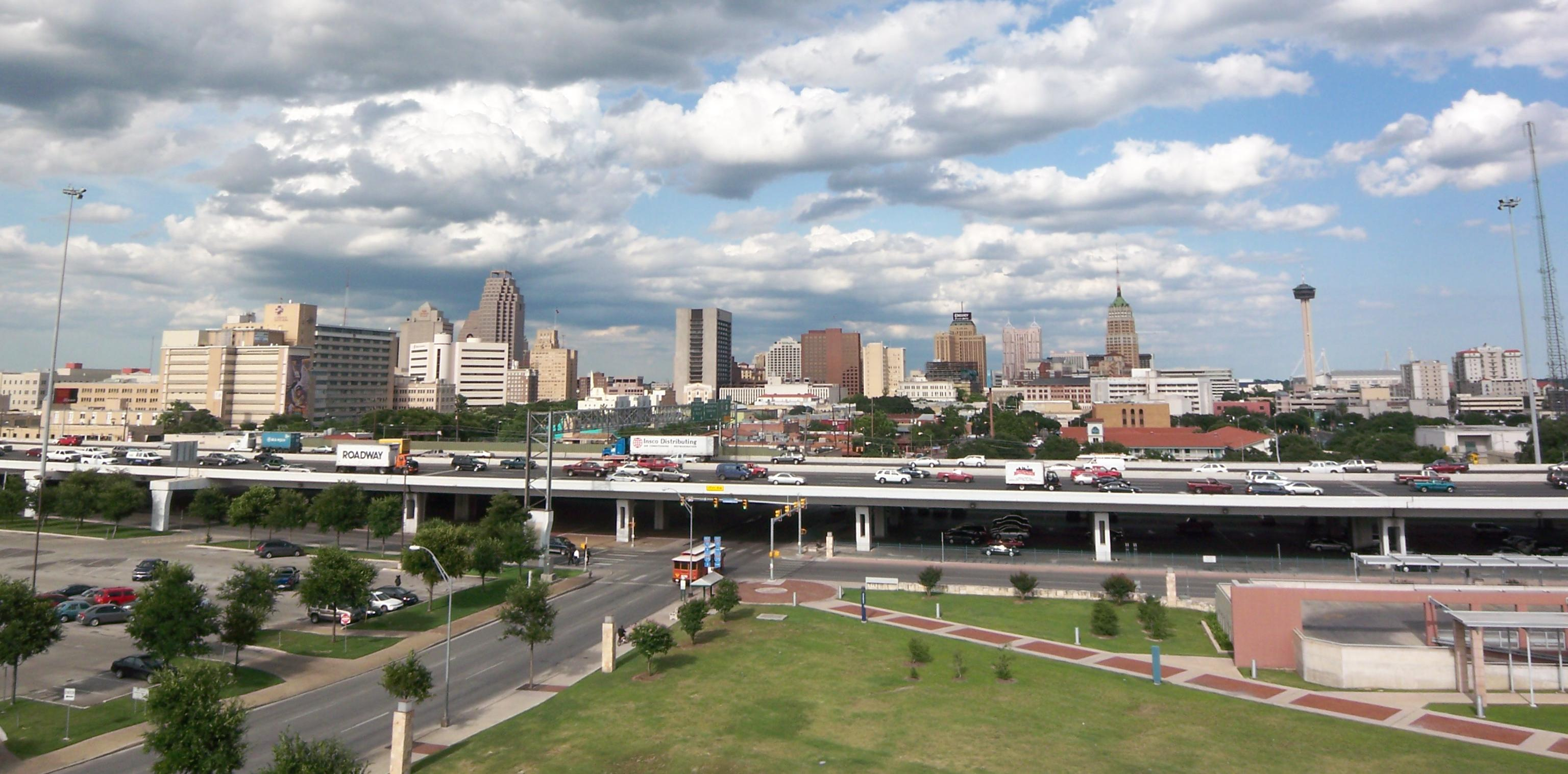
I-10 as an elevated freeway as it runs concurrently with I-35 in Downtown San Antonio.

I-10 is the busiest freeway in San Antonio, with nearly 200,000 vehicles on an average day. On the northwest side, I-10 is known as the McDermott Freeway, named after Robert F. McDermott, former dean of the United States Air Force Academy as well as CEO of San Antonio-based USAA. The highway enters the city concurrently with US 87 from the north and travels more in a north–south direction into downtown, rather than the east–west designation found on the Interstate Highway signs. The section of I-10 from Ralph Fair Road (FM 3351) to La Cantera Parkway includes HOV lanes for both directions. The northern section from Loop 1604 to downtown serves one of the fastest growing areas of the city. A majority of the region's suburban office space is located along the corridor as are the headquarters for USAA, gasoline refiner and retailer Valero, South Texas Medical Center, the University of Texas at San Antonio (UTSA), Six Flags Fiesta Texas, and the Shops at La Cantera. I-10 intersects I-410 for the first time near Balcones Heights, a suburban city within San Antonio. The construction of a four-level interchange to accommodate the growing northwest side has been completed. Heavy commercial development dominates the landscape between I-410 and Loop 1604. Inside I-410, the route is lined with light industrial and residential areas.

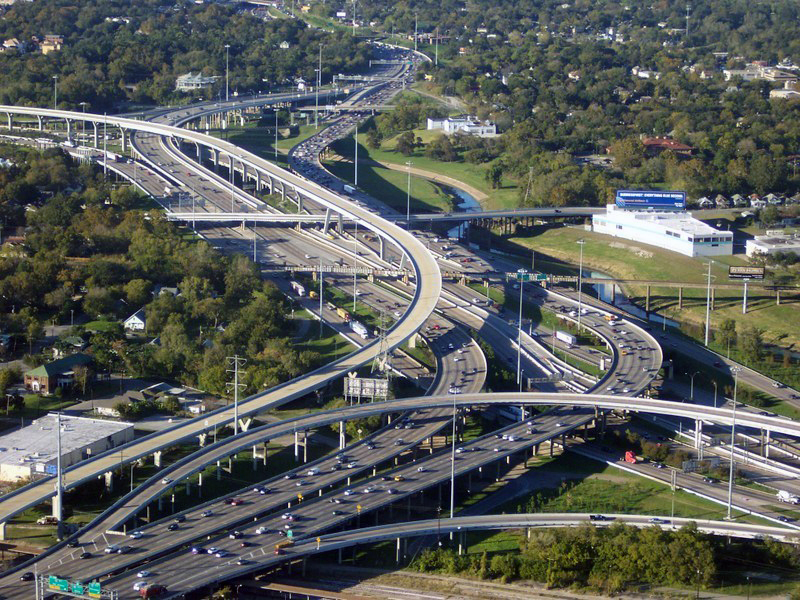
I-45 and I-10/US 90 near Downtown Houston

As I-10 heads south into downtown, it splits into an upper level with three lanes in each direction and a lower level with two lanes in each direction. It was necessary to design the freeway this way in order to accommodate the amount of traffic heading into downtown and to fit into the narrow corridor that was surrounded by existing infrastructure. I-10 meets I-35 on the northwest side of downtown and it overlaps I-35 south to form the west side of the downtown loop. The I-35 exit numbers are carried through during the concurrency. I-10 and I-35 end their concurrency at a four-level interchange on the southwest side of downtown with the junction of US 90 from the west. I-35 continues to the south and I-10 and US 90 run concurrently to the east to form the south side of the downtown loop. This section of I-10 is known as the Jose Lopez Freeway, named after the Medal of Honor recipient. A four-level interchange with I-37 occurs approximately 2 mi (3.2 km) east of the interchange with I-35. I-10 heads east away from downtown through mainly residential neighborhoods on the east side of San Antonio. I-10's concurrency with US 87 ends just east of downtown where US 87 heads south towards Victoria. Leaving San Antonio, I-10 again passes I-410 and Loop 1604. I-10 is known as the 90th Infantry Division Memorial Highway on this stretch east of San Antonio. I-10 and US 90 continue their concurrency until they diverge in Seguin. They continue from there on to Houston nearly paralleling each other with short stints of overlaps along the route.

=== Houston and East Texas (the Katy Freeway) ===
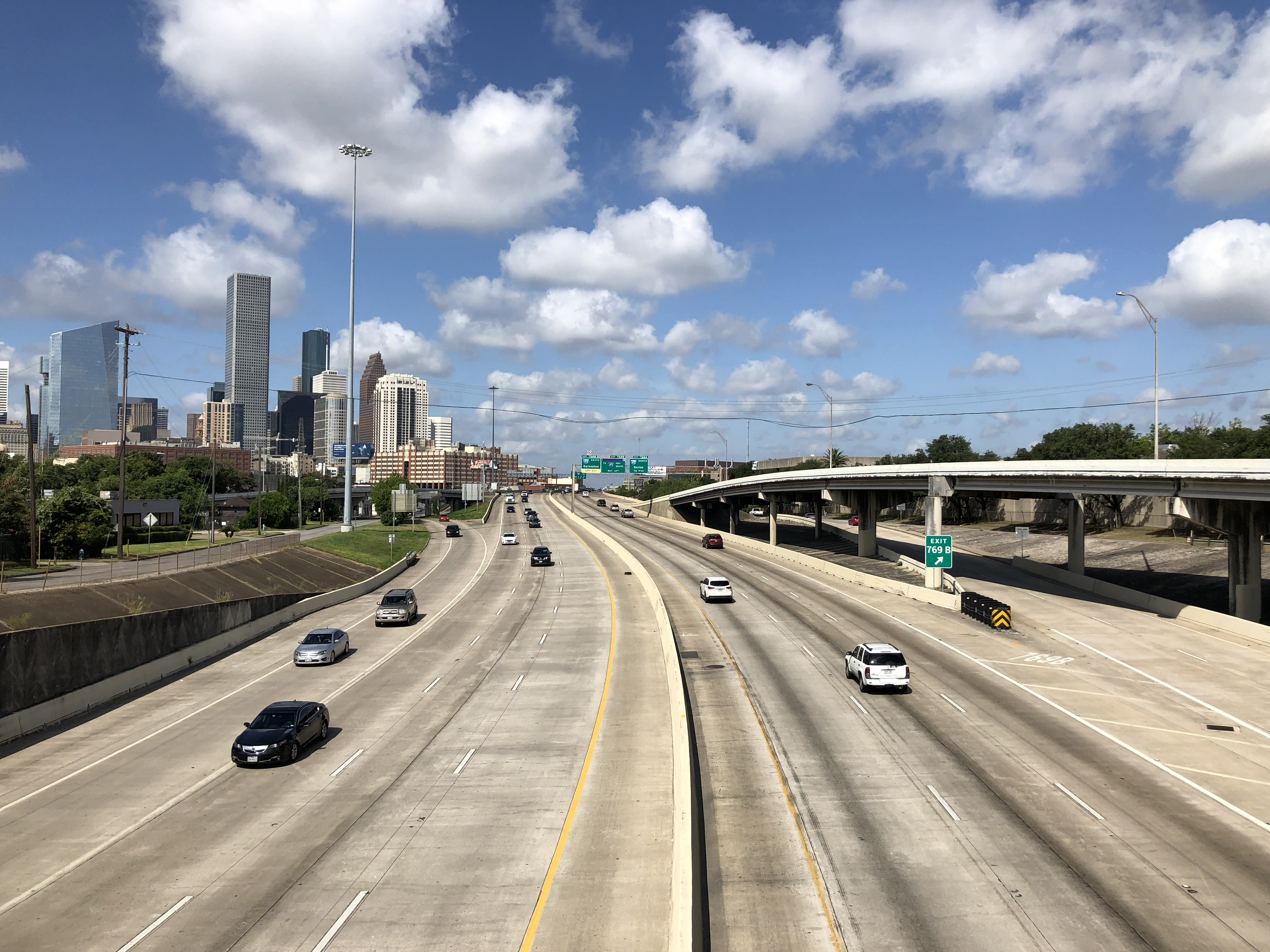
I-10 westbound passing downtown Houston

From the western suburb of Katy to downtown, I-10 is known as the Katy Freeway in Houston. This section was widened in 2008 to as many as 26 total lanes, counting the six lanes of the access (frontage/feeder) road, which feature traffic signals, and driveway access and are not limited-access and therefore not technically part of the freeway itself but are directly adjacent. Between the West Beltway and the West Loop, the Katy Freeway features a basic configuration of 14 lanes, featuring seven lanes each direction. This cross-section swells with auxiliary lanes, ramp lanes, and the inclusion of the frontage access roads, although those lanes are controlled by traffic signals. Including auxiliary lanes, ramp lanes, and the access frontage roads, the minimum lane count is 22 total lanes. In this section, the width is 24 lanes at multiple locations and up to 26 lanes east of Gessner Road (12 main lanes, eight lanes of access roads, and six mid-freeway HOT/HOV lanes). From the Fort Bend County line to I-610, there is a minimum of four main lanes in each direction. The maximum number of undivided lanes at any point on the freeway is nine in the eastbound direction approaching Antoine Drive (though this includes one exit-only lane); this is one of the widest sections of undivided highway in a single direction in the world. The widest right-of-way, 556 feet (169 m), occurs at the Katy Freeway's intersection with Bunker Hill; at that point, the expansion plans called for six main lanes plus two toll lanes in each direction along with 10 lanes on the feeder/frontage roads. While this section still features 14 through continuous lanes through the Bunker Hill interchange, when auxiliary lanes, ramp lanes, and the frontage access roads are included, the actual striping after construction delineates 29 lanes, including all 26 of the planned lanes plus an additional lane in each direction to enter or exit the toll lanes and one more turn lane on the eastbound feeder road. Between Texas State Highway 6 and Interstate 610, I-10 HOV/HOT lanes are known as Katy Managed Lanes, or simply known as Katy Tollway.

Between I-610 and I-45 west of downtown, the interstate contains at least five main lanes in each direction. Before 2008, this section had traditionally been the widest section of I-10 in the Houston area and the only one with a significant portion below grade. A project completed in 2014 added one extra auxiliary lane in each direction between Shepherd Drive and Taylor Street. In addition, the eastbound feeder road that ends at Studemont was extended to Taylor Street. As I-10 travels through downtown, it junctions with I-45 and I-69/US 59. Both interchanges feature left exits, allowing several lane shifts for through traffic. I-10 provides access to Daikin Park, home of the Houston Astros, and also runs through the campus of the University of Houston–Downtown.

The section east of downtown Houston is officially known as the "East Freeway", although it is widely known by locals as the Baytown East Freeway or colloquially shortened to the Beast, due to a marketing push by Baytown, one of the largest cities in the Greater Houston Area. I-10 reaches Beaumont at an interchange with US 69/US 96/US 287 and it runs concurrently with the US Highways for 2.63 mi (4.23 km) and curves to the east again at a second interchange. At College Street (US 90), I-10 expands to eight lanes. I-10 meets US 90 again near the recently reconstructed Purple Heart Memorial Bridge over the Neches River; these highways travel concurrently the remainder of the way across the state. I-10 reaches Orange County and passes through the towns of Rose City, Vidor, Pinehurst, and Orange. Business US 90-Y splits off and comes back to I-10 near the Sabine River Bridge over the Sabine River. At the river, I-10 finally leaves Texas and crosses into Louisiana.

== History ==
=== El Paso and West Texas ===
I-10 replaced and runs concurrently with US 85 from the New Mexico state line up until the two diverge at mile marker 13. The two highways parallel each other for several miles until US 85 continues to head south to the border with Mexico and I-10 turns east towards Downtown El Paso. Prior to the Interstate Highway system, US 85 ran concurrent with US 80 from the New Mexico border until the two diverged in Downtown El Paso. When I-10 was constructed in downtown El Paso, several blocks were demolished, and a sub-grade trench was built for the freeway. A series of overpasses now carry the preexisting north–south surface streets over the east–west stretch of I-10 through downtown. I-10 replaced US 80 through El Paso and to the southeast and east to the present day junction of I-10 and I-20. US 80 along this route has been completely removed from the highway system in favor of I-10.

At the junction with I-20, I-10 replaced US 290 eastward to the present day junction of I-10 and US 290 southeast of Junction. This section of US 290 was deleted from the highway system. From this point to near Comfort, I-10 replaced SH 27. SH 27 still exists along this stretch, mostly paralleling I-10 to the south. From Comfort southeast to San Antonio, I-10 directly replaced US 87.

=== Central Texas ===
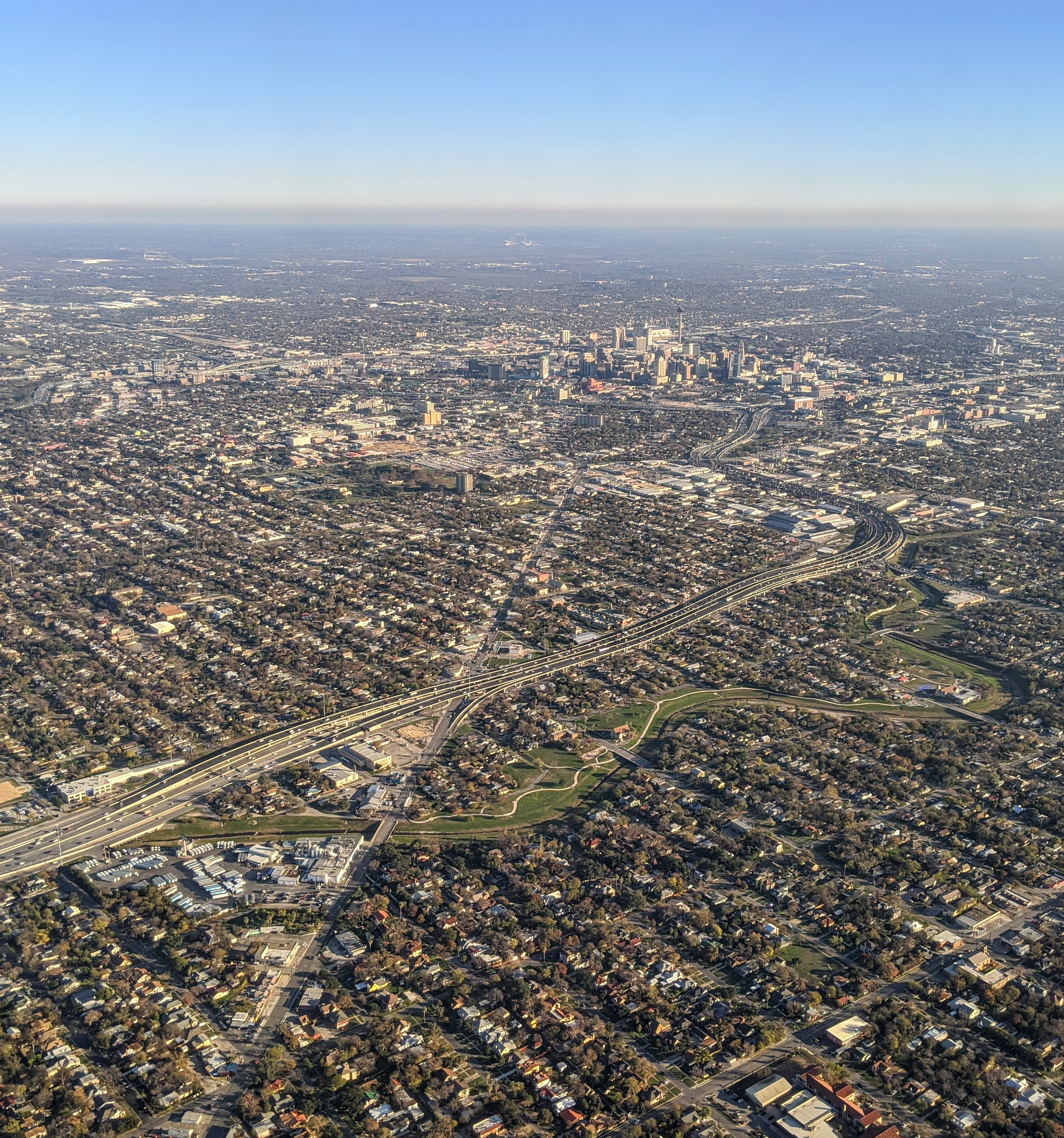
Aerial view from the northwest of San Antonio, with I-10, Frederickburg Road, and Martinez Creek in foreground

I-10 generally follows the alignment of US 87 on the northwest side of San Antonio into downtown. A new alignment was built to the south of downtown for the freeway since it was impossible to upgrade the surface streets in downtown that US 87 and US 90 followed prior to the Interstate Highway System. Southeast of downtown, I-10 curves back to the northeast to connect with the pre-interstate alignment of US 90.

Construction of portions of I-10 were well underway and completed prior to the commissioning of the highway in 1959. The section from Culebra Road to Woodlawn Avenue opened as the first freeway in San Antonio in 1949, signed as US 87. Expansion and construction continued in the 1950s, but the bulk of the construction occurred in the 1960s after the interstate was commissioned. The $11 million project to construct the interchange with I-37 was at the time the largest single contract in the history of the state highway commission. The current alignment was completed by 1968.

Rapid growth in San Antonio led to the original highway quickly becoming inadequate, with the result that it has been in perpetual construction and expansion. In the 1980s, the portion just northwest of downtown was reconstructed to add a double deck feature to expand the freeway to five lanes in each direction. In 1990, the interstate had only two lanes in each direction from Loop 1604 to the southern intersection with Fredericksburg Road. Recent construction has expanded the freeway to five lanes in each direction from just outside I-410 all the way into downtown. The I-10/I-410 interchange was reconstructed into a four-level stack interchange that was completed in 2009, and a new stack interchange is being constructed at I-10/Loop 1604, expected to be completed by 2027. Another connector project, this time at I-10/I-410 east of downtown, is expected to be completed in 2025 as part of a larger project to reconstruct I-10 to the Guadalupe County line.

=== East Texas ===
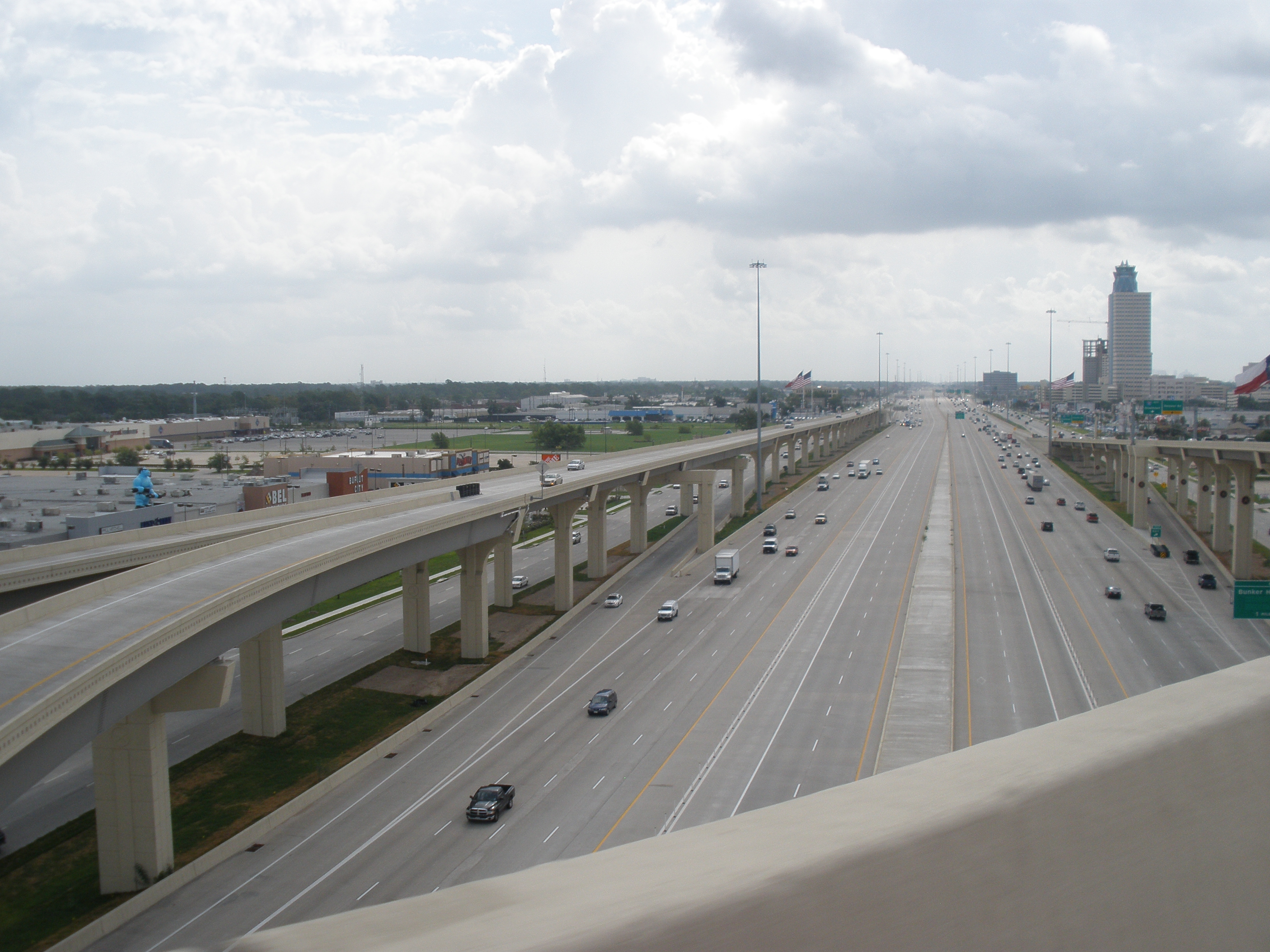
I-10 Katy Freeway in Houston, with managed lanes (HOV + EZ TAG). View toward East from connector ramp with West Sam Houston Tollway (Beltway 8).

When constructed during the 1960s, I-10 between Katy and Houston, known as the Katy Freeway, was built with six to eight lanes wide barring side lanes, being modest by Houston standards because existing traffic demand to the farming area of West Houston was relatively low. As the population and economic activity increased in the area, vehicular traffic increased, reaching an annual average daily traffic (AADT) of 238,000 vehicles just west of the West Loop in 2001.

In 2000, increased traffic levels and congestion led to plans being approved for widening of the freeway to 16 lanes with a capacity for 200,000 cars per day. An old railway running along the north side of the freeway was demolished in 2002 in preparation for construction which began in 2004. The interior two lanes in each direction between SH 6 and west I-610, the Katy Freeway Managed Lanes or Katy Tollway, were built as high-occupancy toll lanes and are managed by the Harris County Toll Road Authority. The section just west of SH 6 to the Fort Bend–Harris county line opened in late June 2006. Two intersections were rebuilt (Beltway 8 and I-610), toll booths were added, together with landscaping as part of Houston's Highway Beautification Project. Most of the section between Beltway 8 and SH 6 had been laid by September 2006 and work was completed in October 2008.

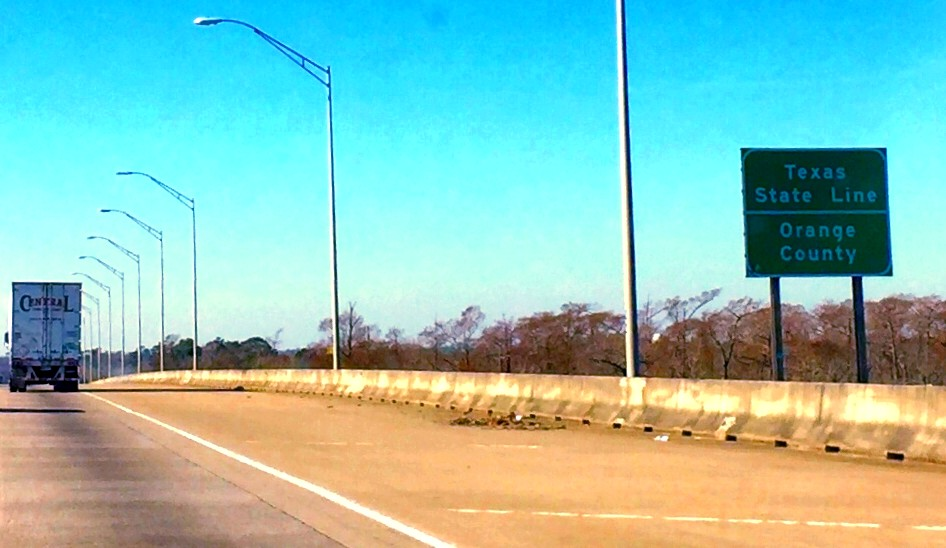
The Texas–Louisiana state line as seen from I-10

Tolls on the managed lanes vary by vehicle occupancy, axle count and time of day. High occupancy vehicles may travel for free at certain times.

Severe flooding of the Sabine River occurred in March 2016. Days of continuous heavy rains, coupled with the controversial opening of the Toledo Bend Dam and the release of 207,000 to 208,000 cubic feet per second (5,900 to 5,900 m^{3}/s) into the river, caused the closing of I-10. The water level in Deweyville rose to 130-year record heights, prompting a joint decision by the Texas Department of Transportation (TxDOT) and the Louisiana Department of Transportation and Development (LaDOTD) to close I-10 for four days near Orange.

Much of I-10 between Houston and Beaumont was shut down in late August 2017 as Hurricane Harvey inundated the Houston and East Texas area with record rainfall. In 2020, I-10 between Beaumont and the Louisiana state line was shut down due to debris and heavy rain caused by Hurricanes Delta and Laura.

== Exit list ==
County	Location	mi	km	Exit	Destinations	Notes
El Paso	Anthony	0.000	0.000		I-10 west (US 85 north / US 180 west) – Las Cruces	Continuation into New Mexico
El Paso	Anthony	0.007– 1.612	0.011– 2.594	0	FM 1905 – Anthony	
El Paso	Anthony	0.644– 2.020	1.036– 3.251	Tourist Info Center; exit 1 (eastbound)		
El Paso	Canutillo	2.657– 3.434	4.276– 5.526	2	Spur 37 (Vinton Road) / Westway Drive	
El Paso	El Paso	4.881– 5.196	7.855– 8.362	5	Check Station	Eastbound only
El Paso	El Paso	5.858– 6.679	9.428– 10.749	6A	Loop 375 (Transmountain Road)	Signed as exits 6A (east) and 6B (west) westbound
El Paso	El Paso	7.573– 8.451	12.188– 13.601	8	SH 178 (Artcraft Road) / Paseo del Norte	
El Paso	El Paso	8.782– 10.241	14.133– 16.481	9	Redd Road	
El Paso	El Paso	10.821– 11.422	17.415– 18.382	11	SH 20 (Mesa Street) / Thorn Avenue	Thorn Avenue not signed eastbound
El Paso	El Paso	12.642– 12.749	20.345– 20.518	12	Resler Drive	Closed; former westbound exit and eastbound entrance now part of US 85/SH Loop 375
El Paso	El Paso	12.025– 14.525	19.352– 23.376	13	Loop 375 east / US 85 south (Paisano Drive) / Sunland Park Drive / Resler Drive	Eastern end of US 85 concurrency; clockwise terminus of Loop 375; Loop 375 / US 85 not signed westbound; Resler Drive not signed eastbound
El Paso	El Paso	15.826– 16.271	25.469– 26.186	16	Mesa Park Drive, Executive Center Boulevard	
El Paso	El Paso	17.689– 18.335	28.468– 29.507	18A	Schuster Avenue, University Avenue – UT El Paso	
El Paso	El Paso	18.444– 18.815	29.683– 30.280	18B	Porfirio Díaz Street, Franklin Avenue	No westbound entrance
El Paso	El Paso	19.029– 19.792	30.624– 31.852	19A	SH 20 (Mesa Street) – Downtown El Paso, Convention Center, Tourist Information, Arts District	Signed as exit 19 eastbound; eastbound traffic enter Downtown via Wyoming Avenue
El Paso	El Paso	19.922	32.061	19B	Downtown El Paso, Convention Center, Tourist Information, Arts District	Westbound exit only; downtown access via Missouri Avenue
El Paso	El Paso	20.108– 21.940	32.361– 35.309	20	Dallas Street, Cotton Street	
El Paso	El Paso	20.938– 21.923	33.696– 35.282	21	Piedras Street	
El Paso	El Paso	21.536– 22.463	34.659– 36.151	22A	Loop 478 (Copia Street)	
El Paso	El Paso	21.847– 23.058	35.159– 37.108	22B	US 54 east (Patriot Freeway) to Loop 375 / I-110 – Fort Bliss, Juárez	US 54 exit 21; I-110 exit 21A
El Paso	El Paso	22.657– 23.365	36.463– 37.602	23A	Raynolds Street	
El Paso	El Paso	23.254– 24.001	37.424– 38.626	23B	US 62 / US 180 east (Paisano Drive) / Chelsea Street	Eastern end of US 180 concurrency
El Paso	El Paso	23.787– 24.980	38.281– 40.201	24	Geronimo Drive, Trowbridge Drive	Signed as exits 24A (Trowbridge) and 24B (Geronimo) eastbound
El Paso	El Paso	25.369– 26.520	40.827– 42.680	25	Airway Boulevard – El Paso Airport	
El Paso	El Paso	25.790– 27.326	41.505– 43.977	26	Hawkins Boulevard	
El Paso	El Paso				Gateway Boulevard West	Westbound entrance only
El Paso	El Paso	26.793	43.119	27	Hunter Drive, Viscount Boulevard	Eastbound exit and westbound entrance; westbound access is via exit 28A
El Paso	El Paso	27.811– 28.463	44.757– 45.807	28A	FM 2316 (McRae Boulevard) / Sumac Drive / Viscount Boulevard	Access to Del Sol Medical Center-East; Sumac Drive not signed westbound, Viscount Boulevard not signed eastbound
El Paso	El Paso	28.717– 29.316	46.216– 47.180	28B	Yarbrough Drive, Sumac Drive	
El Paso	El Paso	29.660	47.733	29	Lomaland Drive	Eastbound exit and westbound entrance; westbound access is via exit 30
El Paso	El Paso	30.047– 31.546	48.356– 50.768	30	Lee Trevino Drive, Lomaland Drive	Lomaland Drive not signed eastbound
El Paso	El Paso	31.487– 32.937	50.673– 53.007	32	FM 659 (Zaragoza Road, George Dieter Road)	
El Paso	El Paso	33.800	54.396	33	Don Haskins Drive	Westbound exit only
El Paso	El Paso	33.218– 34.395	53.459– 55.353	34	Loop 375 / Americas Avenue, Joe Battle Boulevard	Signed as exits 34A (Loop 375) and 34B (Americas Avenue, Joe Battle Boulevard)
El Paso	Socorro	34.970– 35.868	56.279– 57.724	35	Eastlake Boulevard	
El Paso	Socorro	36.847– 38.464	59.299– 61.902	37	FM 1281 (Horizon Boulevard) – Horizon City, Socorro	
El Paso	Clint	42.438– 43.068	68.297– 69.311	42	FM 1110 – Clint, San Elizario	
El Paso	Fabens	49.206– 49.595	79.189– 79.815	49	FM 793 – Fabens	
El Paso		50.302– 50.993	80.953– 82.065		El Paso County Safety Rest Area	there is no exit number for this exit
El Paso	Tornillo	55.215– 55.671	88.860– 89.594	55	Tornillo	
Hudspeth	Fort Hancock	68.1	109.6	68	Acala Road	
Hudspeth	Fort Hancock	72.3	116.4	72	Spur 148 – Fort Hancock	
Hudspeth	Fort Hancock	78.4	126.2	78	SH 20 west – McNary	
Hudspeth		81.6	131.3	81	FM 2217	
Hudspeth		85.1	137.0	85	Esperanza Road	
Hudspeth		87.6	141.0	87	FM 34	
Hudspeth		95.4	153.5	95	Frontage Road	Eastbound exit and entrance
Hudspeth		98.9	159.2	99	Lasca Road	
Hudspeth	Sierra Blanca	105.6	169.9	105	I-10 BL east (El Paso Street)	Signed as exit 106 westbound
Hudspeth	Sierra Blanca	106.9	172.0	107	RM 1111 (Sierra Blanca Avenue)	
Hudspeth	Sierra Blanca	108.5	174.6	108	I-10 BL west – Sierra Blanca	Westbound exit only
Hudspeth	Allamoore	128.9	207.4	129	Allamore	
Hudspeth		132.7	213.6	133	Frontage Road	Westbound exit and entrance
Culberson	Van Horn	137.8	221.8	138	I-10 BL east / Golf Course Drive	
Culberson	Van Horn	139.7	224.8	140A	US 90 / SH 54 (Van Horn Drive) – Valentine, Marfa, Alpine	Access to Culberson County Airport
Culberson	Van Horn	140.6	226.3	140B	I-10 BL west (Ross Drive)	
Culberson	Wild Horse	146.3	235.4	146	Wild Horse Road	
Culberson	Michigan Flat	152.9	246.1	153	Michigan Flat	
Culberson	Plateau	159.4	256.5	159	Plateau	
Culberson	Boracho	166.0	267.2	166	Boracho Station	
Culberson		172.6	277.8	173	Hurds Draw Road	
Culberson	Kent	176.3	283.7	176	SH 118 / RM 2424 – Kent, Fort Davis	
Jeff Davis		181.1	291.5	181	Cherry Creek Road	
Jeff Davis		183.6	295.5	184	Springhills	
Reeves		186.2	299.7	186	I-10 east – San Antonio	Westbound left exit and eastbound left entrance; provides access to I-10 east for travelers coming from I-20 west
Reeves		186.8	300.6	187	I-20 east – Fort Worth, Dallas	No eastbound entrance; left exit eastbound; no exit number eastbound; Fort Worth not signed westbound; western terminus of I-20
Reeves		187.6	301.9	188	Giffin Road	
Reeves		192.3	309.5	192	FM 3078 east – Toyahvale, Fort Davis	
Reeves	Balmorhea	206.0	331.5	206	I-10 BL east / FM 2903 – Toyah, Balmorhea	
Reeves	Balmorhea	209.0	336.4	209	I-10 BL west / SH 17 south – Balmorhea, Fort Davis	Western end of SH 17 concurrency
Reeves	Saragosa	211.5	340.4	212	SH 17 / FM 2448 – Pecos	Eastern end of SH 17 concurrency
Reeves		213.8	344.1	214	FM 2448	Westbound exit and eastbound entrance
Reeves		221.7	356.8	222	Hoefs Road	
Pecos		229.1	368.7	229	Hovey Road	
Pecos		235.2	378.5	235	Mendel Road	
Pecos		240.8	387.5	241	Kennedy Road	
Pecos		245.9	395.7	246	Firestone Road	
Pecos		248.1	399.3	248	US 67 south / FM 1776 – Alpine, Marfa, Presidio, Sul Ross State University	Western end of US 67 concurrency
Pecos		252.3	406.0	253	FM 2037	
Pecos	Fort Stockton	256.2	412.3	256	I-10 BL east – Fort Stockton	
Pecos	Fort Stockton	257.0	413.6	257	US 285 – Pecos, Sanderson	No westbound entrance, access to Fort Stockton-Pecos County Airport
Pecos	Fort Stockton	258.5	416.0	259B	SH 18 – Monahans	Signed as exit 259 eastbound, access to Pecos County Memorial Hospital
Pecos	Fort Stockton	259.3	417.3	259A	FM 1053	Eastbound access is via exit 259
Pecos	Fort Stockton	260.8	419.7	261	I-10 BL west / US 385 south – Fort Stockton, Marathon	Western end of US 385 concurrency
Pecos		263.8	424.5	264	Warnock Road	
Pecos		271.5	436.9	272	University Road	
Pecos		272.6	438.7	273	US 67 north / US 385 north – San Angelo, McCamey	Eastern end of US 67/US 385 concurrency; no eastbound entrance
Pecos		276.6	445.1	277	RM 2023	
Pecos		284.4	457.7	285	McKenzie Road	
Pecos		287.5	462.7	288	Ligon Road	
Pecos	Bakersfield	294.1	473.3	294	FM 11 – Bakersfield	
Pecos		298.4	480.2	298	RM 2886	
Pecos		306.8	493.7	307	US 190 to FM 305 – Iraan, McCamey	
Pecos		314.3	505.8	314	Frontage Road	
Pecos		319.9	514.8	320	Frontage Road	
Pecos		324.8	522.7	325	SH 290 / SH 349 – Iraan, Sheffield	
Crockett		327.8	527.5	328	County Road 307	
Crockett		336.7	541.9	337	County Road 305	
Crockett		343.1	552.2	343	SH 290 west – Sheffield	
Crockett		349.5	562.5	350	RM 2398 (County Road 405)	
Crockett		360.8	580.7	361	RM 2083	
Crockett	Ozona	363.4	584.8	363	Loop 466 / RM 2398 – Ozona	
Crockett	Ozona	365.2	587.7	365	SH 163 – Sterling City, Comstock	Access to Ozona Municipal Airport
Crockett	Ozona	367.5	591.4	368	Loop 466 – Ozona	
Crockett		371.8	598.4	372	Taylor Box Road	
Sutton		380.9	613.0	381	RM 1312	Eastbound exit and westbound entrance
Sutton		387.3	623.3	388	RM 1312	Westbound exit and eastbound entrance
Sutton		391.8	630.5	392	RM 1989 (Caverns of Sonora Road) to RM 1312	
Sutton	Sonora	399.3	642.6	399	Loop 467 – Sonora	Eastbound exit and westbound entrance
Sutton	Sonora	400.0	643.7	400	US 277 – San Angelo, Del Rio	Access to Sonora Municipal Airport
Sutton	Sonora	403.8	649.9	404	Loop 467 / RM 864 / RM 3130 – Sonora, Fort McKavett	
Sutton		411.8	662.7	412	RM 3307 / County Road 305	Formerly signed "To RM 3130 / Allison Road "
Sutton		420.0	675.9	420	RM 3130 / County Road 306	
Sutton		428.4	689.4	429	County Road 306 to RM 3130	Formerly signed "To RM 3130 / Harrell Road"
Kimble	Roosevelt	436.9	703.1	437	Loop 291 east – Roosevelt	Eastbound exit and westbound entrance
Kimble	Roosevelt	438.2	705.2	438	Loop 291 – Roosevelt	Westbound exit and eastbound entrance
Kimble		440.7	709.2	442	Loop 291 west to RM 1674 – Fort McKavett	Loop 291 not signed westbound
Kimble		444.8	715.8	445	RM 1674	Eastbound exit and westbound entrance
Kimble		451.1	726.0	451	RM 2291 (Cleo Road)	
Kimble	Junction	455.4	732.9	456	US 83 north / US 377 to Loop 481 – Junction, Menard	Western end of US 83 concurrency, access to Kimble Hospital
Kimble	Junction	457.3	736.0	457	FM 2169 (Martinez Street) – Junction	
Kimble	Junction	459.8	740.0	460	Loop 481 – Junction, Texas Tech University Center at Junction	Westbound exit and eastbound entrance
Kimble		461.5	742.7	462	US 83 south – Leakey	Eastern end of US 83 concurrency
Kimble	Segovia	464.5	747.5	465	FM 2169 – Segovia	
Kimble		471.3	758.5	472	RM 479 / FM 2169 / Old Segovia Road	
Kimble		475.6	765.4	476	Stapp Ranch Road	Eastbound exit and westbound entrance
Kimble		476.6	767.0	477	US 290 east – Fredericksburg	
Kerr		483.9	778.8	484	Midway Road	
Kerr	Mountain Home	487.5	784.6	488	SH 27 – Mountain Home, Ingram	
Kerr	Mountain Home	489.8	788.3	490	SH 41 – Mountain Home, Rocksprings	
Kerr		491.8	791.5	492	RM 479	
Gillespie	No major junctions					
Kerr		501.1	806.4	501	FM 1338	
Kerr	Kerrville	504.8	812.4	505	RM 783 – Harper, Kerrville	
Kerr	Kerrville	507.7	817.1	508	SH 16 – Kerrville	Access to Peterson Regional Medical Center, Kerrville VA Medical Center
Kerr		519.5	836.1	520	FM 1341	
Kendall	Comfort			522	North Creek Road	Westbound exit and eastbound entrance
Kendall	Comfort	522.4	840.7	523	US 87 north / Bus. US 87 south – San Angelo, Comfort, Fredericksburg	Western end of US 87 concurrency
Kendall	Comfort	524.0	843.3	524	Bus. US 87 north / FM 1621 – Comfort, Waring	
Kendall		526.6	847.5	527	FM 1621 / FM 289 – Waring	Eastbound access is via exit 524
Kendall		532.7	857.3	533	FM 289 – Welfare	
Kendall	Boerne	536.9	864.1	537	Bus. US 87 south – Boerne	
Kendall	Boerne	537.6	865.2	538	Ranger Creek Road	Westbound exit and eastbound entrance
Kendall	Boerne	538.7	867.0	539	Johns Road	
Kendall	Boerne	540.1	869.2	540	SH 46 – New Braunfels, Bandera	Access to Boerne-Methodist Hospital
Kendall	Boerne	541.8	871.9	542	Bus. US 87 north (South Main Street)	
Kendall	Boerne	542.8	873.6	543	Scenic Loop Road, Cascade Caverns Road	
Bexar	Fair Oaks Ranch	544.6	876.4	545	Balcones Creek Road, Dietz Elkhorn Road	
Bexar	Fair Oaks Ranch	546.1	878.9	546	Fair Oaks Parkway, Tarpon Drive	
Bexar	Fair Oaks Ranch	548.2	882.2	548	Old Fredericksburg Road, Buckskin Drive	
Bexar	Leon Springs	549.5	884.3	550	FM 3351 (Ralph Fair Road)	
Bexar	San Antonio	550.6	886.1	551	Boerne Stage Road – Leon Springs	Eastbound access is via exit 550
Bexar	San Antonio	552.9	889.8	552	Dominion Drive	
Bexar	San Antonio	553.8	891.3	554	Camp Bullis Road	
Bexar	San Antonio	553.9	891.4	555	La Cantera Parkway – Fiesta Texas	
Bexar	San Antonio	555.5	894.0	556A	Loop 1604 (Anderson Loop)	Conversion to stack interchange completed in Early 2026
Bexar	San Antonio	555.8	894.5	556B	Frontage Road	Access to VIA Park and Ride
Bexar	San Antonio	557.0	896.4	557	UTSA Boulevard – University of Texas at San Antonio	Former Spur 53
Bexar	San Antonio	557.4	897.0	558	De Zavala Road	
Bexar	San Antonio	558.3	898.5	559	Spur 345 south (Fredericksburg Road)	Eastbound exit and westbound entrance; access to South Texas Medical Center
Bexar	San Antonio	558.9	899.5	560A	Huebner Road	Signed as exit 560 westbound; access to South Texas Medical Center
Bexar	San Antonio	559.8	900.9	560B	Frontage Road	Eastbound exit and entrance
Bexar	San Antonio	560.3	901.7	561	Wurzbach Road	Access to South Texas Medical Center
Bexar	San Antonio	561.3	903.3	562	Medical Drive	Westbound access is via exit 561; access to South Texas Medical Center
Bexar	San Antonio	562.7	905.6	563	Callaghan Road	Eastbound access is via exit 562
Bexar	San Antonio	562.8	905.7	564	I-410 (Connally Loop)	I-410 exit 16; access to San Antonio International Airport
Bexar	San Antonio	563.0	906.1	565A	Crossroads Boulevard – Balcones Heights	Access to Methodist Texsan Hospital
Bexar	San Antonio	564.3	908.2	565B	Vance Jackson Road	
Bexar	San Antonio	565.2	909.6	566A	West Avenue	
Bexar	San Antonio	566.0	910.9	566B	Fresno Drive	
Bexar	San Antonio	566.2	911.2	566C	Hildebrand Avenue, Fulton Avenue	Signed as exit 567A westbound
Bexar	San Antonio	567.3	913.0	567	Fredericksburg Road / Woodlawn Avenue	Signed as exit 567B westbound; westbound exit via lower level
Bexar	San Antonio	568.1	914.3	568A	Cincinnati Avenue	Westbound exit via lower level and eastbound entrance via lower level
Bexar	San Antonio	568.5	914.9	568B	Spur 421 (Culebra Avenue) – Bandera	Signed as exit 568 eastbound; access via upper level
Bexar	San Antonio	568.7	915.2	569A	Colorado Street	Signed as exit 569 westbound; access via lower level; no eastbound entrance
Bexar	San Antonio	569.0	915.7	569B	Frio Street – Downtown San Antonio	Eastbound exit via lower level and entrance via lower level
Bexar	San Antonio	569.1	915.9	569C	Santa Rosa Street – Downtown San Antonio	Eastbound exit via upper level and westbound entrance via upper level
Bexar	San Antonio	569.6	916.7	570	I-35 north (Pan Am Expressway) – Austin	Western end of I-35 concurrency; no exit number westbound (concurrent section uses I-35 exit numbers); I-35 exit 156 southbound
Bexar	San Antonio	See I-35				
Bexar	San Antonio	572.2	920.9	572	US 90 west (Rodriguez Freeway) – Del Rio, Lackland AFB, Port San Antonio	Western end of US 90 concurrency
Bexar	San Antonio	572.4	921.2	572	I-35 south (Pan Am Expressway) – Laredo	Eastern end of I-35 concurrency; exit 153 northbound
Bexar	San Antonio	573.0	922.2	573	To Spur 536 (Roosevelt Avenue) / Probandt Street	
Bexar	San Antonio	574.1	923.9	574	I-37 / US 281 (Adams Freeway) – Corpus Christi, Johnson City, Downtown San Antonio, The Alamo	I-37 exit 139, access to San Antonio Amtrak Station
Bexar	San Antonio	574.9	925.2	575	Pine Street, Hackberry Street	
Bexar	San Antonio	575.1	925.5	576	New Braunfels Avenue, Gevers Street	
Bexar	San Antonio	576.5	927.8	577	US 87 south (Roland Avenue) – Victoria	Eastern end of US 87 concurrency
Bexar	San Antonio	577.4	929.2	578	Pecan Valley Drive, M. L. King Drive	
Bexar	San Antonio	578.5	931.0	579	Houston Street, Commerce Street	
Bexar	San Antonio	579.6	932.8	580	Loop 13 (W. W. White Road)	
Bexar	San Antonio	580.4	934.1	581	I-410 (Connally Loop) / SH 130 south	Western end of SH 130 concurrency; I-410 exit 33; undergoing conversion from cloverleaf to stack interchange.
Bexar	San Antonio	581.4	935.7	582	Ackerman Road – Kirby	No access from I-10 eastbound, exit is from I-410 to I-10 eastbound
Bexar	San Antonio	581.7	936.2	583	Foster Road	
Bexar	San Antonio	582.6	937.6	584	Woodlake Parkway	
Bexar	San Antonio	585.2	941.8	585	FM 1516 – Converse	
Bexar	San Antonio	586.8	944.4	587	Loop 1604 (Anderson Loop) – Randolph AFB, Universal City	
Bexar	San Antonio	588.6	947.3	589	Graytown Road, Pfeil Road	
Bexar	San Antonio	591.2	951.4	591	FM 1518 – Schertz	
Bexar	Converse	593.1	954.5	593	FM 2538 (Trainer Hale Road)	
Guadalupe	Marion	594.8	957.2	595	Zuehl Road	
Guadalupe	Marion	596.7	960.3	597	Santa Clara Road	
Guadalupe	Marion	598.5	963.2	599	FM 465 – Marion	
Guadalupe		600.1	965.8	600	Schwab Road	
Guadalupe		601.0	967.2	601	FM 775 – New Berlin, La Vernia	
Guadalupe	Seguin	602.9	970.3	603	US 90 east to US 90 Alt. – Seguin	Eastern end of US 90 concurrency; eastbound exit and westbound entrance
Guadalupe	Seguin	603.8	971.7	604	FM 725 – Lake McQueeney	
Guadalupe	Seguin	604.9	973.5	605	FM 464	
Guadalupe	Seguin	606.4	975.9	607	SH 46 / FM 78 – New Braunfels, Lake McQueeney	
Guadalupe	Seguin	608.3	979.0	609	Bus. SH 123 (Austin Street)	
Guadalupe	Seguin	609.5	980.9	610	SH 123 – San Marcos, Stockdale	
Guadalupe	Seguin	611.5	984.1	612	US 90 – Seguin	
Guadalupe	Seguin	613.8	987.8	614	SH 130 Toll north – Austin, Waco	Eastern end of SH 130 concurrency
Guadalupe	Kingsbury	616.8	992.6	617	FM 2438 – Kingsbury	
Guadalupe	Kingsbury	619.2	996.5	619	Guadalupe County Safety Rest Area	Signed as exit 618 eastbound
Guadalupe	Kingsbury	619.6	997.1	620	FM 1104 – Kingsbury	
Guadalupe		625.2	1,006.2	625	Darst Field Road	
Guadalupe	Luling	627.4	1,009.7	628	SH 80 – Nixon, Luling, San Marcos	
Gonzales	No major junctions					
Caldwell	Luling	631.6	1,016.5	632	US 183 to US 90 – Gonzales, Cuero, Luling, Lockhart, Austin	
Gonzales		636.8	1,024.8	637	FM 794 – Harwood	
Gonzales		642.3	1,033.7	642	SH 304 – Bastrop, Gonzales	
Gonzales		649.0	1,044.5	649	SH 97 – Waelder, Gonzales	
Gonzales		652.4	1,049.9	653	US 90 – Waelder	
Fayette	Flatonia	661.2	1,064.1	661	SH 95 / FM 609 – Flatonia, Smithville, La Grange, Moulton, Shiner	
Fayette		667.6	1,074.4	668	FM 2238 – Engle	
Fayette	Schulenburg	673.6	1,084.1	674	US 77 – Schulenburg, La Grange	
Fayette		676.9	1,089.4	677	US 90	
Colorado	Weimar	681.4	1,096.6	682	FM 155 – Weimar, La Grange	
Colorado		689.1	1,109.0	689	US 90 / Hattermann Lane	
Colorado				692	Colorado County Safety Rest Area	
Colorado		692.5	1,114.5	693	FM 2434 to SH 71 west – Glidden, La Grange	
Colorado	Columbus	693.8	1,116.6	695	SH 71 west – La Grange, Austin	Western end of SH 71 concurrency; no eastbound exit
Colorado	Columbus	695.6	1,119.5	696	SH 71 east / Bus. SH 71 – Columbus, El Campo	Eastern end of SH 71 concurrency
Colorado		698.1	1,123.5	698	US 90 west / Alleyton Road – Columbus	Western end of US 90 concurrency
Colorado		699.4	1,125.6	699	FM 102 – Eagle Lake	
Colorado		703.5	1,132.2	704	FM 949 – Bernardo, Cat Spring	
Colorado		708.9	1,140.9	709	FM 2761 / Bernardo Road – Bernardo	
Austin		711.3	1,144.7	713	Beckendorff Road	
Austin	Sealy	715.5	1,151.5	716	Pyka Road	
Austin	Sealy	717.5	1,154.7	718	US 90 east / FM 3538	Eastern end of US 90 concurrency
Austin	Sealy			719	Rexville Road	Westbound exit only
Austin	Sealy	719.3	1,157.6	720	SH 36 – Sealy, Rosenberg, Bellville	
Austin	Sealy	720.2	1,159.0	720A	Outlet Center Drive	Eastbound exit and westbound entrance
Austin	Sealy	721.5	1,161.1	721	US 90 west	Western end of US 90 concurrency; westbound exit and eastbound entrance
Austin	San Felipe	722.2	1,162.3	723	FM 1458 – San Felipe, Frydek	
Austin		724.7	1,166.3	725	Mlcak Road	Eastbound access is via exit 723
Austin		725.4	1,167.4	726	Chew Road, Bartlett Road	
Waller		727.8	1,171.3	729	Peach Ridge Road, Donigan Road (US 90 east)	Eastern end of US 90 concurrency; signed as exit 730 westbound
Waller	Brookshire	731.1	1,176.6	731	FM 1489 (Koomey Road) – Simonton	
Waller	Brookshire	731.9	1,177.9	732	FM 359 – Brookshire, Fulshear	
Waller		733.9	1,181.1	734	Woods Road	
Waller	Katy	735.0	1,182.9	735	Igloo Road, Jordan Ranch Boulevard	No westbound entrance
Waller	Katy	736.1	1,184.6	737	Pederson Road	
Waller	Katy	738.4	1,188.3	739	Cane Island Parkway	
Fort Bend	Katy	739.1	1,189.5	740	FM 1463	
Fort Bend	Katy	739.8	1,190.6	741	Pin Oak Road	Westbound access is via exit 740
Harris	Katy	741.1	1,192.7	741	US 90 west / Katy Mills Boulevard	Western end of US 90 concurrency; westbound exit and eastbound entrance
Harris	Katy	741.5	1,193.3	742	Katy-Fort Bend County Road	Eastbound access is via exit 741
Harris	Katy	741.8	1,193.8	743A	SH 99 (Frontage Road)	Signed as exit 743 westbound; access to Memorial Hermann Katy Hospital
Harris	Katy	742.3	1,194.6	743B	SH 99 Toll north / SH 99 south (Grand Parkway)	
Harris	Katy	743.2	1,196.1	745	Mason Road	
Harris	Katy	744.6	1,198.3	746	Westgreen Boulevard	
Harris	Katy	745.5	1,199.8	747A	Fry Road	
Harris	Katy	746.5	1,201.4	747B	Greenhouse Road	
Harris	Houston	747.3	1,202.7	748	Barker–Cypress Road	Access to West Houston Airport and Methodist West Houston Hospital
Harris	Houston	748.6	1,204.8	750	Park Ten Boulevard	
Harris	Houston	749.8	1,206.7	751	SH 6	Former FM 1960
Harris	Houston	750.6	1,208.0	—	I-10 Toll begins (Katy Tollway)	Western end of Katy Tollway
Harris	Houston	751.4	1,209.3	—	Addicks Park & Ride	Interchange for Katy Tollway only
Harris	Houston	751.1	1,208.8	753A	Eldridge Parkway	
Harris	Houston	752.6	1,211.2	753B	Dairy Ashford Road	
Harris	Houston	753.3	1,212.3	754	Kirkwood Road	
Harris	Houston	754.3	1,213.9	755	Wilcrest Drive	
Harris	Houston	755.8	1,216.3	756A	Beltway 8 (Frontage Road)	Eastbound access is via exit 755
Harris	Houston	755.1	1,215.2	756B	Sam Houston Tollway	Signed as exit 756 eastbound
Harris	Houston	755.9	1,216.5	757	Gessner Road	Access to Memorial Hermann Memorial City Medical Center
Harris	Houston	757.2	1,218.6	758	Bunker Hill Road	
Harris	Houston	757.9	1,219.7	759A	Blalock Road, Echo Lane	Signed as exit 759 eastbound
Harris	Houston	758.7	1,221.0	759B	Campbell Road	Eastbound access is via exit 759
Harris	Houston	758.8	1,221.2	760	Bingle Road, Voss Road	
Harris	Houston	759.7	1,222.6	761A	Wirt Road, Chimney Rock Road	Signed as exit 761 eastbound
Harris	Houston	761.0	1,224.7	761B	Antoine Drive, Silber Road	Eastbound access is via exit 761
Harris	Houston	760.7	1,224.2	—	North Post Oak Road – NW Transit Center	Eastbound exit only for Katy Tollway
Harris	Houston	761.5	1,225.5	—	I-10 Toll ends (Katy Tollway)	Eastern end of Katy Tollway
Harris	Houston	761.0	1,224.7	762	Silber Road, North Post Oak Road, Katy Road	Signed as exit 762B westbound; Katy Road not signed eastbound
Harris	Houston	762.0	1,226.3	763	I-610 (West Loop Freeway)	I-610 exit 11; entrance from I-610 south includes direct entrance ramp from US 290 (Northwest Freeway)
Harris	Houston	762.8	1,227.6	♦	US 290 (Express Lanes)	HOV/toll exit; westbound exit and eastbound entrance
Harris	Houston	763.5	1,228.7	764	Washington Avenue, Westcott Street	
Harris	Houston	764.3	1,230.0	765A	T. C. Jester Boulevard	
Harris	Houston	764.6	1,230.5	765B	Durham Drive, Shepherd Drive, Patterson Street	
Harris	Houston	765.3	1,231.6	766	Yale Street, Heights Boulevard	
Harris	Houston	765.8	1,232.4	767A	Studemont Street	Eastbound exit and westbound entrance
Harris	Houston	766.5	1,233.6	767B	Taylor Street	
Harris	Houston	767.3– 767.7	1,234.8– 1,235.5	768	I-45 (North Freeway, Gulf Freeway) – Dallas, Galveston	Signed as exits 768A (north) and 768B (south); left exits eastbound; I-45 exit 48; ramp from I-10 eastbound to I-45 northbound shut down until mid-2028 for demolition and rebuilding as part of the I-10 White Oak Bayou elevation project, access to I-45 is via I-610 north
Harris	Houston	768.1	1,236.1	769A	Smith Street – Downtown Houston	Eastbound exit and westbound entrance, access to Houston Amtrak station
Harris	Houston	768.5	1,236.8	769B	San Jacinto Street / Main Street	Westbound exit and eastbound entrance, access to Houston Amtrak station
Harris	Houston	768.6	1,236.9	769C	McKee Street, Hardy Street	Eastbound exit and westbound entrance
Harris	Houston	769.1– 769.4	1,237.7– 1,238.2	770	I-69 / US 59 (Eastex Freeway) – Victoria, Cleveland	I-69/US 59 exit 132; signed as exits 770A (south) and 770C (north)
Harris	Houston	769.3	1,238.1	770B	Jensen Drive, Meadow Street, Gregg Street	
Harris	Houston	770.4	1,239.8	771A	Waco Street	
Harris	Houston	770.9	1,240.6	771B	Lockwood Drive	No westbound entrance
Harris	Houston	771.5	1,241.6	772	Kress Street, Lathrop Street	
Harris	Houston	772.5	1,243.2	773A	US 90 Alt. (North Wayside Drive)	
Harris	Houston	772.9	1,243.9	773B	McCarty Drive	
Harris	Houston	773.7	1,245.1	774	Gellhorn Drive	Eastbound exit and westbound entrance
Harris	Houston	773.9	1,245.5	775A	I-610 (East Loop Freeway)	I-610 exit 26
Harris	Houston	774.1	1,245.8	775B	US 90 east (Crosby Freeway) – Liberty	Eastern end of US 90 concurrency; eastbound exit and westbound entrance
Harris	Houston	775.1	1,247.4	776A	Mercury Drive – Jacinto City, Galena Park	
Harris	Houston	775.5	1,248.0	776B	John Ralston Road, Holland Avenue	
Harris	Houston	776.4	1,249.5	778A	FM 526 (Federal Road)	Westbound access is via exit 778
Harris	Houston	777.6	1,251.4	778B	Normandy Street	Signed as exit 778 westbound
Harris	Houston	778.5	1,252.9	779A	Westmont Street	Westbound exit only
Harris	Houston	778.6	1,253.0	779B	Market Street Road / Uvalde Road	Signed as exit 780 eastbound; access to East Houston Regional Medical Center
Harris	Channelview	779.6	1,254.6	780	Freeport Street	Eastbound access is via exit 779B
Harris	Channelview	780.1	1,255.4	781A	Beltway 8 (Frontage Road)	Eastbound exit and westbound entrance
Harris	Channelview	780.5	1,256.1	781	Beltway 8 (Sam Houston Parkway) to Sam Houston Tollway	Signed as exits 781B eastbound and 781A westbound; southbound Beltway 8 provides access to Sam Houston Tollway including toll bridge
Harris	Channelview	781.3	1,257.4	781B	Market Street	Westbound exit only
Harris	Channelview	781.2	1,257.2	782	Dell Dale Avenue	No westbound entrance
Harris	Channelview	782.2	1,258.8	783	Sheldon Road	
Harris	Channelview	783.1	1,260.3	784	Cedar Lane, Bayou Drive	
Harris	Channelview	784.4	1,262.4	785	Magnolia Avenue	
Harris	Channelview	785.5	1,264.1	786	Monmouth Drive	
Harris	Baytown	787.0	1,266.6	787	Crosby-Lynchburg Road	
Harris	Baytown	787.5	1,267.4	788	Spur 330 east – Baytown	Westbound access is via exit 787
Harris	Baytown	788.5	1,269.0	789	Thompson Road	
Harris	Baytown	789.2	1,270.1	790	Ellis School Road	Westbound exit only
Harris	Baytown	789.9	1,271.2	790	Wade Road	Westbound access is via exit 791
Harris	Baytown	790.6	1,272.3	791	John Martin Road	
Harris	Baytown	791.5	1,273.8	792	Garth Road	Access to San Jacinto Methodist Hospital
Harris	Baytown	792.6	1,275.6	793	North Main Street	
Harris	Baytown	794.1	1,278.0	795	Sjolander Road	
Harris	Baytown	795.2	1,279.8	796	Frontage Road	Signed as exit 796B westbound
Chambers	Mont Belvieu	796.7	1,282.2	798	SH 146 – Mont Belvieu, Baytown, Dayton	Signed as exit 797 eastbound
Chambers	Mont Belvieu	798.6	1,285.2	799	SH 99 Toll (Grand Parkway)	Access to Grand Parkway via frontage roads; northbound SH 99 Toll opened in May 2022.
Chambers	Mont Belvieu	799.9	1,287.3	800	FM 3180 (Eagle Drive)	
Chambers	Cove	802.4	1,291.3	803	FM 565 – Cove, Old River-Winfree	
Chambers		804.6	1,294.9	805	Trinity River Boat Ramp Turnaround	Eastbound exit and westbound entrance
Chambers		805.7	1,296.6	806	Frontage Road	Westbound entrance only
Chambers		806.4	1,297.8	807	Wallisville	
Chambers		809.0	1,302.0	810	FM 563 – Anahuac, Liberty	
Chambers		810.6	1,304.5	811	Turtle Bayou Turnaround	Eastbound exit only
Chambers		811.2	1,305.5	813	SH 61 – Hankamer, Anahuac	Signed as exit 812 eastbound
Chambers		814.0	1,310.0	815	Frontage Road, Wallace Road - Rest Area	Signed as exit 814 eastbound; rest areas off each direction's respective Frontage Road
Chambers		816.0	1,313.2	817	FM 1724	
Chambers		818.3	1,316.9	819	Jenkins Road	
Chambers		821.8	1,322.6	822	FM 1410	
Chambers	Winnie	826.5	1,330.1	827	FM 1406	
Chambers	Winnie	827.4	1,331.6	828	SH 73 / SH 124 – Winnie, Port Arthur	Eastbound exit and westbound entrance
Chambers	Winnie	827.9	1,332.4	829	FM 1663 to SH 73 / SH 124 – Winnie, Galveston	
Chambers	Winnie			831	Brush Island Road	Exit opened in February 2022
Jefferson		832.3	1,339.5	833	Hamshire Road	
Jefferson		837.7	1,348.1	838	FM 365 – Fannett, Nome	
Jefferson		842.8	1,356.4	843	Smith Road	
Jefferson	Beaumont	844.4	1,358.9	845	FM 364 (Major Drive)	Westbound access is via exit 847
Jefferson	Beaumont	846.1	1,361.7	847	Brooks Road	Eastbound access is via exit 845
Jefferson	Beaumont	847.5	1,363.9	848	Walden Road	
Jefferson	Beaumont	848.6	1,365.7	849	US 69 south / US 96 south / US 287 south – Port Arthur	Western end of US 69/US 96/US 287 concurrency; access to Jack Brooks Regional Airport
Jefferson	Beaumont	849.5	1,367.1	850	Washington Boulevard	Eastbound access is via exit 849
Jefferson	Beaumont	850.1	1,368.1	851	US 90 (College Street) – Liberty	Western end of US 90 concurrency; access to Baptist Beaumont Hospital
Jefferson	Beaumont	851.5	1,370.4	852A	Laurel Avenue	Westbound exit and eastbound entrance
Jefferson	Beaumont	850.5	1,368.7	852B	Calder Avenue, Harrison Avenue, Gladys Avenue	
Jefferson	Beaumont	851.7	1,370.7	853A	US 69 north / US 96 north / US 287 north – Lufkin, Jasper	Eastern end of US 69/US 96/US 287 concurrency
Jefferson	Beaumont	852.2	1,371.5	853B	11th Street	
Jefferson	Beaumont	852.9	1,372.6	853C	7th Street	Eastbound exit and westbound entrance
Jefferson	Beaumont	853.4	1,373.4	854	Spur 380 (M. L. King Parkway)	
Jefferson	Beaumont	854.2	1,374.7	855A	Willow Street – Downtown Beaumont	
Jefferson	Beaumont	854.3	1,374.9	855B	Magnolia Avenue, Pine Street	Eastbound access is via exit 854
Neches River				Purple Heart Memorial Bridge		
Orange		855.3	1,376.5	856	Old Highway 90 – Rose City	Eastbound exit and westbound entrance
Orange	Rose City	857.3	1,379.7	858	Asher Turnaround – Rose City	
Orange	Rose City	858.3	1,381.3	859	Dewitt Road, Bonner Turnaround, Asher Turnaround	
Orange	Vidor	859.5	1,383.2	860	FM 105 (N Main Street) – Vidor	Westbound access is via exit 861
Orange	Vidor	860.4	1,384.7	861	Tram Road, Old Highway	Westbound access is via exit 862B
Orange	Vidor	860.6	1,385.0	861A	SH 12 – Mauriceville, Deweyville	Westbound exit signed as exit 862B
Orange	Vidor	861.8	1,386.9	862A	Timberlane Drive, Lakeside Street	Eastbound exit only
Orange	Vidor	863.2	1,389.2	864	FM 1132 (Evangeline Drive) / FM 1135 (Kishi Road)	
Orange	Vidor	864.6	1,391.4	865	Doty Road	Westbound exit only
Orange	Vidor	866.5	1,394.5	867	Frontage Road	Eastbound exit only
Orange		867.7	1,396.4	869	FM 1442 – Bridge City	
Orange		869.2	1,398.8	870	FM 1136	
Orange		871.3	1,402.2	872	North Mimosa Lane, Jackson Drive	Westbound exit only
Orange	Orange	871.8	1,403.0	873	SH 62 / SH 73 – Bridge City, Port Arthur, Mauriceville	
Orange	Orange	872.4	1,404.0	874A	Bus. US 90 east – Pinehurst	Eastbound exit and westbound entrance; eastbound entrance is via Womack Road
Orange	Orange	873.3	1,405.4	875	Womack Road	Westbound exit and eastbound entrance
Orange	Orange–Pinehurst line	873.5	1,405.8	875	FM 3247 (M. L. King Jr. Drive)	Signed eastbound as exit 874; separate westbound exit from Womack Road; access to Baptist Orange Hospital
Orange	Orange–Pinehurst line	874.7	1,407.7	875	Woodlark Street	Eastbound exit and entrance only
Orange	Orange	875.7	1,409.3	876	Frontage Road – Adams Bayou	Closed for construction; normally westbound exit only
Orange	Orange	875.8	1,409.5	877	SH 87 (16th Street) – Orange, Newton	No westbound exit (closed for construction)
Orange	Orange	877.1	1,411.6	878	Bus. US 90 west (Simmons Drive)	
Orange	Orange	878.7	1,414.1	879	Texas Travel Information Center	Eastbound access is via exit 880
Orange	Orange	879.0	1,414.6	880	Sabine River Turnaround	
Sabine River		879.6	1,415.6	Texas–Louisiana line		
Sabine River		879.6	1,415.6		I-10 east / US 90 east – Lake Charles	Continuation into Louisiana
1.000 mi = 1.609 km; 1.000 km = 0.621 mi: Closed/former; Concurrency terminus; Electronic toll collection; HOV only; Incomplete access; Unopened

== Related highways ==
I-10 has four business loops within the state. All of these routes are in the far western Trans-Pecos region. These routes are located along the former routes of US 80 and US 290.

- Bus. I-10-C in Sierra Blanca
- Bus. I-10-D in Van Horn
- Bus. I-10-F in Balmorhea
- Bus. I-10-G in Fort Stockton.

I-10 has three auxiliary routes in Texas:

- I-110: A spur route in El Paso providing a connection over the Bridge of the Americas to Ciudad Juarez in Mexico
- I-410: The inner beltway around San Antonio, signed locally as the Connally Loop
- I-610: The inner beltway around Houston

== Notes ==
Interstate 10
Previous state: New Mexico	Texas	Next state: Louisiana
