= Boracho, Texas =

Unincorporated community in Texas, US

Coordinates: 31°04′38″N 104°23′19″W

Boracho is an unincorporated community located east of Plateau and Van Horn in Culberson County, Texas, United States.

== History ==
A post office called Boracho was established in 1908, and closed in 1912, with Mary E. Glenn as postmistress.

== Etymology ==
The town name is the Spanish word for "drunk".
