= Texas State Highway Beltway 8 =

Highway in Texas

State Highway Beltway 8
- Tolled sections in green, free sections in red

Route information
- Maintained by TxDOT
- Length: 88.1 mi (141.8 km)
- Existed: 1983–present

Major junctions
- Beltway around Houston
- SH 225 in Pasadena; I-45 in Houston; SH 288 / SH 288 Toll in Houston; I-69 / US 59 in Houston; I-10 / US 90 in Houston; US 290 in Houston; I-45 in Houston; I-69 / US 59 in Houston; I-10 near Channelview

Location
- Country: United States
- State: Texas
- County: Harris

Highway system
- Highways in Texas; Interstate; US; State; Former; Toll; Loops; Spurs; FM/RM; Park; Rec
| ← SH 8 | → FM 8 |

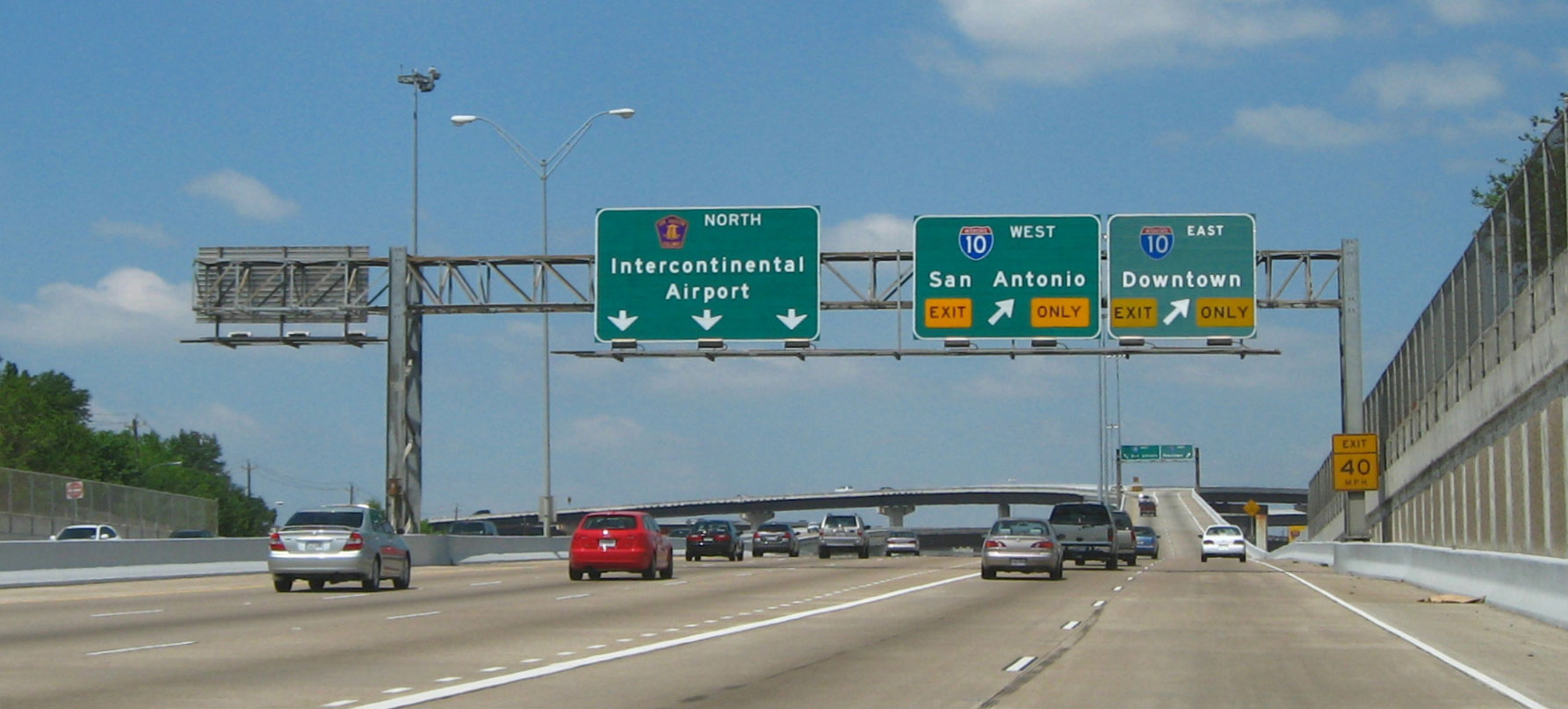
Northbound at I-10 on the west side of Houston in 2007

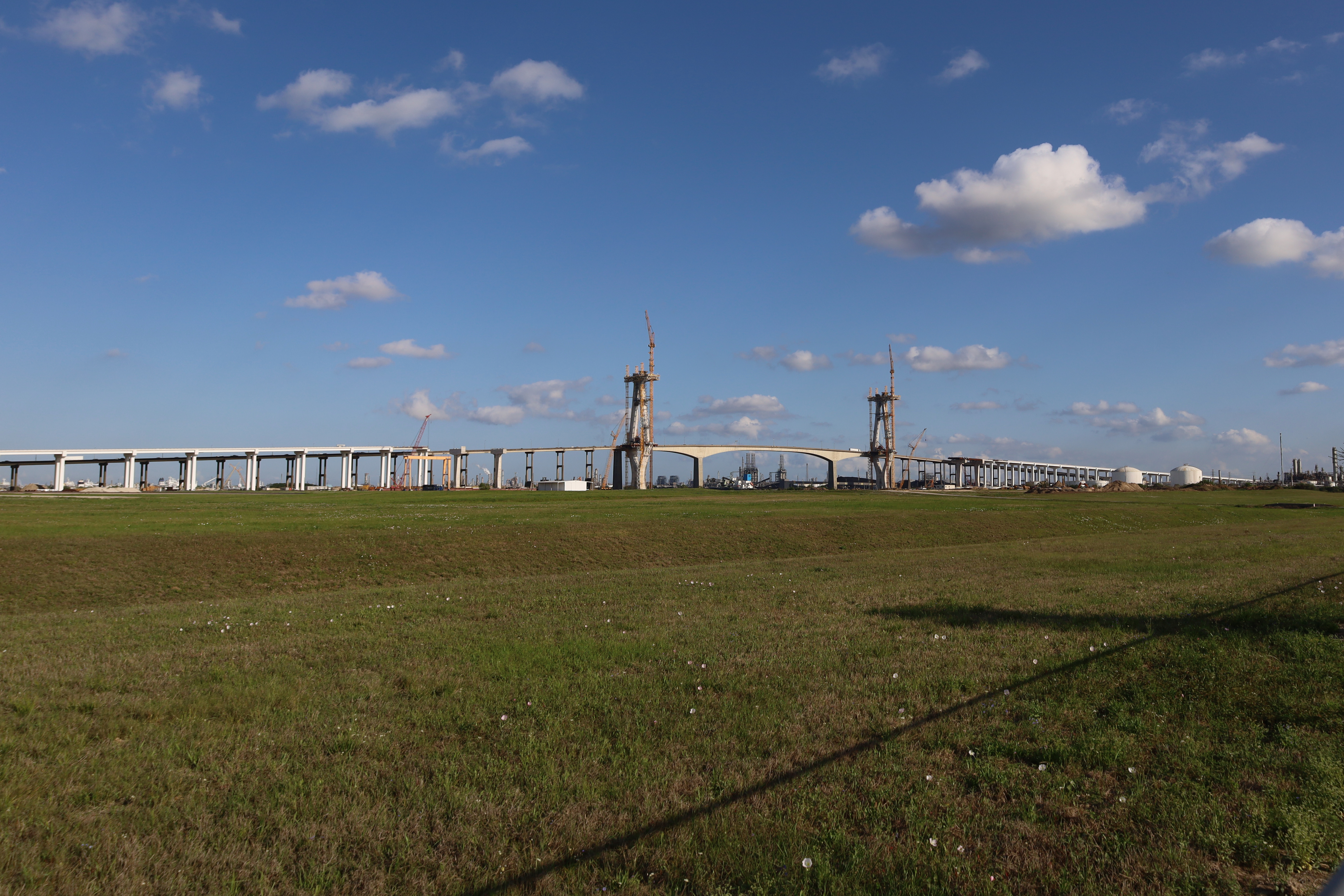
The Sam Houston Tollway crosses the Houston Ship Channel on a bridge whose replacement is under construction as of 2026

Beltway 8 (BW8), the Sam Houston Parkway, along with the Sam Houston Tollway, is an 88-mile (142 km) beltway around the city of Houston, Texas, United States, lying entirely within Harris County.

Beltway 8, a state highway maintained by the Texas Department of Transportation (TxDOT), runs mostly along the frontage roads of the tollway, only using the main lanes where they are free. The main lanes elsewhere are the Sam Houston Tollway, a toll road owned and operated by the Harris County Toll Road Authority (HCTRA).

Beltway 8 is the intermediate beltway in the Houston area. The inner beltway, I-610, lies mostly within Houston (except for an approximate two-mile (3.2 km) stretch that runs through the City of Bellaire), and the outer beltway, SH 99 (Grand Parkway), is currently partially complete.

Like other toll roads in the Houston area, the speed limit is 65 mph (105 km/h).

== Route description ==
=== Free sections ===
The longest free section of main lanes is on the north side of Houston, stretching from Ella Boulevard east to Mesa Drive. This is maintained by TxDOT east of roughly the Hardy Toll Road interchange. This particular free section has remained untolled since its 1969 opening because of accessibility to George Bush Intercontinental Airport. It includes the interchanges with I-69/US 59 (Eastex Freeway), John F. Kennedy Boulevard, the Hardy Toll Road, and I-45 (North Freeway).

Three shorter free sections also exist:

- North of Wallisville Road to Jacinto Port Boulevard, including the I-10 (Baytown-East Freeway) interchange.
- SH 3 (Galveston Road) to Beamer Road, including the I-45 (Gulf Freeway) interchange.
- West Airport Boulevard to Beechnut Street, including the I-69/US 59 (Southwest Freeway) interchange.

These all exist in order to allow federal funding to have been used to build the freeway-to-freeway interchanges at the Baytown-East, Gulf and Southwest Freeways.

East of Houston, the tollway crosses the Houston Ship Channel on the Sam Houston Ship Channel Bridge, a toll bridge; this forms a gap in Beltway 8 between I-10 (Baytown-East Freeway) and SH 225 (La Porte Freeway).

The frontage roads are generally continuous, and allow for slower free travel along the tolled segments. Only one break exists in the frontage roads; there are also several locations where one must turn to stay on them:

- Jacinto Port Boulevard to SH 225—the frontage roads do not cross the Houston Ship Channel (and thus that piece of Beltway 8 was removed in 1978).
- Deerwood Drive to Boheme Drive—both directions are on the east side of the tollway for the crossing of Buffalo Bayou.
- West Little York Road to US 290 (Northwest Freeway)—both directions shift to the west side, intersecting US 290 at Senate Avenue, northwest of the tollway. The west side shift was eliminated in late 2013 where the frontage road right of way was extended to US 290 as part of the US 290 widening project—the former lanes which shifted to the west side was re-routed to the new frontage roads with a signalized crossing.
- At the Katy Freeway, some of the frontage road lanes bypass the intersection, allowing vehicles on the frontage road to travel through the interchange without stopping at traffic lights. The bypass was incorporated into the Katy Freeway reconstruction project to relieve congestion. Since a majority of the intersection is below grade level and had a past history of flooding during heavy rains, the bypass is elevated.
- A section of the frontage road at Mykawa Road shared the right-of-way with the tollway from 1997 to 2016 (which merged into a single lane); with the widening of the tolled lanes between SH 288 and I-45, TxDOT constructed two flyover ramps (completed July 2016) which goes over a railroad right of way with two lanes per direction (this was originally planned back in 1997 until the widening project from the Southwest Freeway to I-10 east revived it). Back in 1997 when the southern portion of the tollway opened up motorists were forced to make a turn onto Mykawa Road and head south to Knapp Road in Pearland where it had an at-grade railroad crossing (the City of Pearland removed the access to the railroad crossing where a section of McHard Road during the mid-2000s a few miles south incorporated a flyover bridge over the existing railroad right-of-way).

=== Lane configuration ===
The lane count is for mainlanes only, unless otherwise noted. Starting at the north end of the Sam Houston Ship Channel Bridge, and moving in a clockwise direction, mainlane counts are as follows:

- Two lanes each way between I-10 (East Freeway) and SH 225 (includes the Sam Houston Ship Channel Bridge);
- Four lanes each way between SH 225 and SH 3 (Galveston Road);
- Three lanes each way between SH 3 (Galveston Road) and Beamer Road;
- Four lanes each way between Beamer Road and SH 288 (South Freeway)
- Four lanes each way between SH 288 (South Freeway) and I-69/US 59 (Southwest Freeway);
- Four lanes each way between I-69/US 59 (Southwest Freeway) and US 290;
- Four lanes each way between US 290 and West Road;
- Five lanes counterclockwise and four lanes clockwise between West Road and Gessner Road;
- Four lanes each way between Gessner Road and I-45;
- Three lanes each way between I-45 and JFK Boulevard (construction started in 2012 to add additional lanes to this section);
- Four lanes each way between JFK Boulevard and I-69/US 59 (Eastex Freeway); and
- Three lanes each way between I-69/US 59 (Eastex Freeway) and I-10 (East Freeway).

== Tolls ==
=== EZ Tag ===
An EZ Tag or an interoperable toll tag is the only legal way to drive on the Sam Houston Tollway. In 2022, HCTRA closed the cash lanes on the Sam Houston Tollway, replacing them with a lane for non-tag traffic. The non-tag traffic lanes have since been converted to EZ Tag only lanes.

=== Enforcement ===
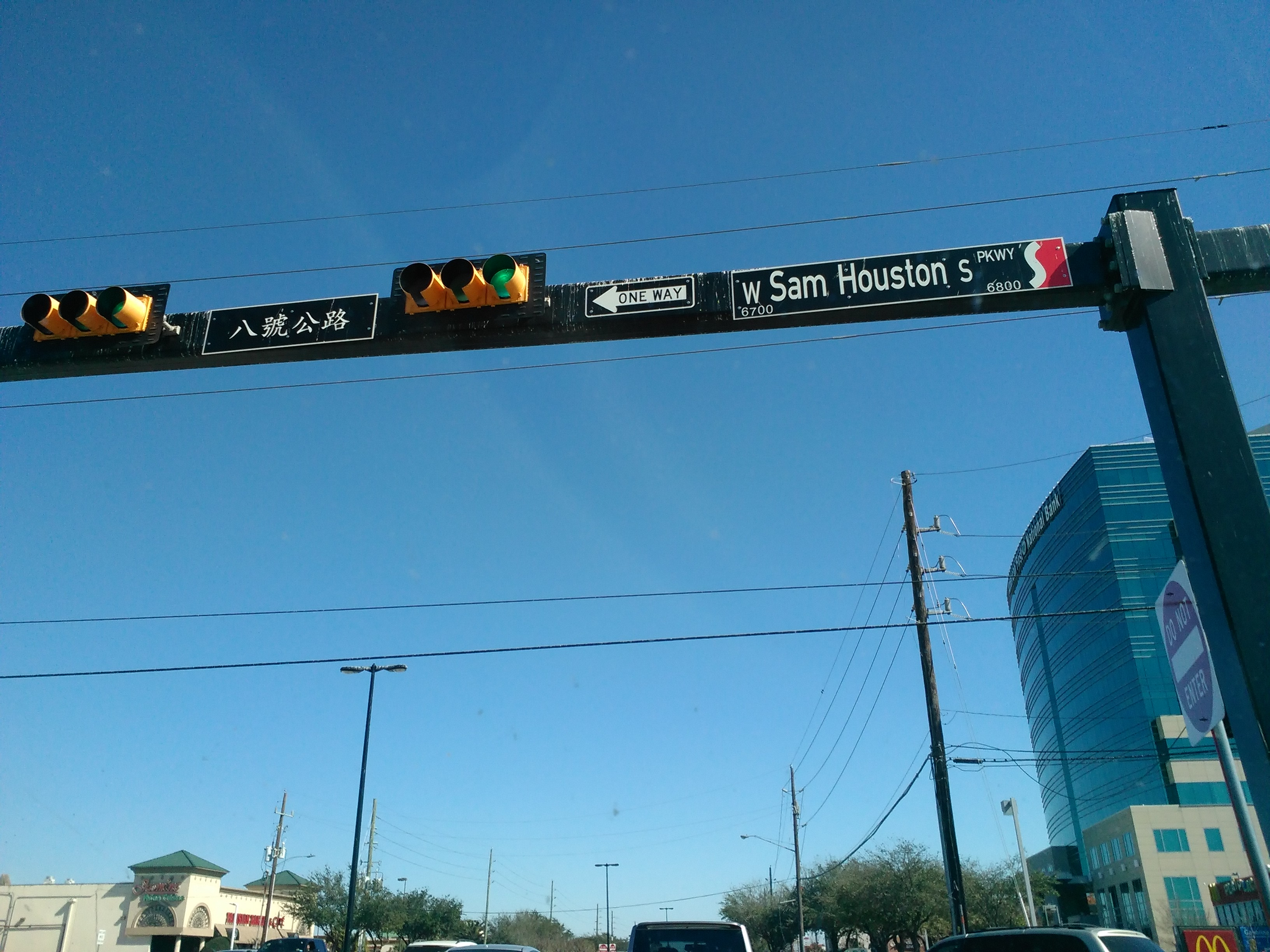
Beltway 8 (八號公路 Bāhào Gōnglù) sign in Chinatown

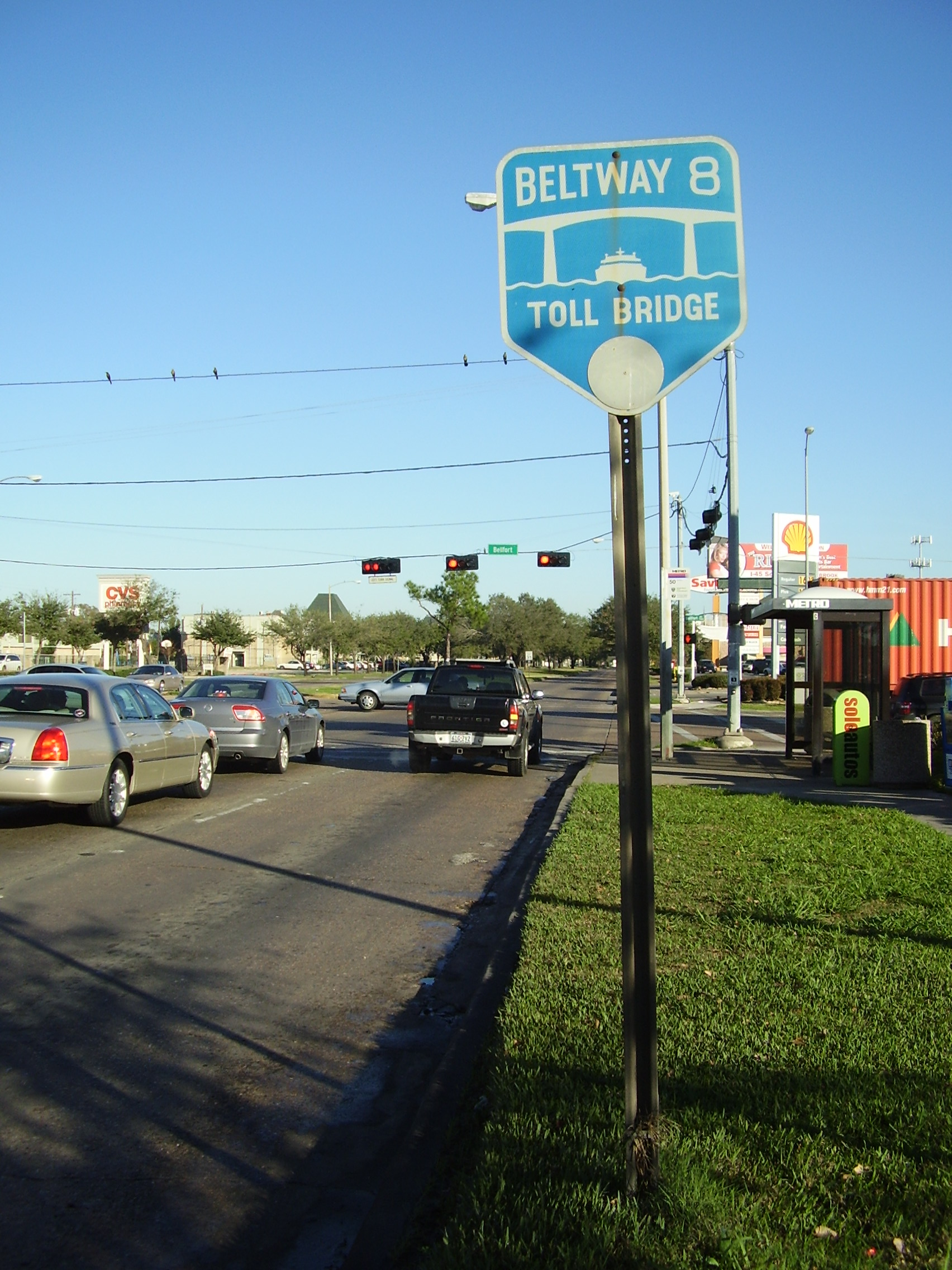
Sign indicating proximity to the Beltway 8 Toll Bridge

A number of cameras are located at toll booths to record license plate information to a database and send a ticket for toll violations via mail. In April 2008, this system has been upgraded to alert local authorities if a vehicle has been flagged for any reason, including Amber alerts. When a flagged vehicle is detected, it notifies the closest law enforcement officer to investigate. At this time, Precinct 5 Constables and Harris County Sheriff's Office are being notified, but Houston Police Department has shown interest and wishes to be included to be notified. The total number of cameras that are planned for the system is 35.

== History ==
A previous route numbered Loop 8 was designated on September 25, 1939, in Beaumont, running from US 59 (later US 96, after the 1939 redescription of the highway system) at Gladys Street via Gulf Street, North Street, and Fourth Street to US 90 as a renumbering of SH 8 Loop. This route was cancelled on January 18, 1944.

Houston, known for its fast population growth, began planning for a second beltway in the 1950s (the first was the I-610 loop, created between the 1950s and the 1970s). The beltway was designated as part of the state highway system, reusing the Loop 8 number, on May 7, 1969. Because the proposed route had been referred to locally as the Outer Belt, and Harris County used similar nomenclature for segments of the route, the designation was changed to Beltway 8 on July 31, 1969. It is the only state highway loop to bear the "Beltway" designation.

The beltway's construction was done in a piecemeal fashion, beginning with the opening of West Belt Drive and Roark Road, two surface streets, in the mid-1970s. Efforts to construct a bridge over the Houston Ship Channel were stymied until the Texas Turnpike Authority (TTA) was able to do so as a toll facility in the late 1970s. As a result, the section of Beltway 8 from I-10 to SH 225 on the east side of Houston was removed from the state highway system on July 24, 1978. The Jesse H. Jones Memorial Bridge was opened in 1982. The TTA, however, turned down the opportunity to improve the entire beltway as well, leaving Harris County to upgrade the road to freeway standards. However, Harris County could not afford to build and maintain a freeway from its general fund.

In September 1983, county voters approved a referendum by a 7–3 margin to release up to $900 million in bonds to create two toll roads, the Hardy Toll Road (a reliever for I-45 between downtown Houston and Montgomery County) and the Sam Houston Tollway, which would be the main lanes of the Beltway. Shortly after the referendum, the Harris County Commissioners Court created HCTRA to administer the construction and operation of the new road system. Then-County Judge Jon Lindsay is generally credited with shepherding the referendum from its infancy to its passage, along with the implementation of the plan for the roadway. During the public information campaign leading up to the referendum, the county government published brochures stating that the toll roads would become free once their construction costs had been recouped, but the tolls were not removed after the tollways were paid off.

In 1989, The Bangles performed at the opening of the segment of Beltway 8 between I-10 (Katy Freeway) and US 290. On July 7, 1990, a ceremony, called Road Party II, took place for the opening of the section of Beltway 8 between I-45 (North Freeway) and US 290, the final segment. Organizers had planned for a crowd of 100,000. KLOL, a radio station, sponsored the event. Jerry Lightfoot & The Essential Band did the opening 80-minute set. The band Huey Lewis and the News performed at the ceremony. The segment between US 290 and I-45 opened on July 8, 1990. The project was on schedule and $133 million (equivalent to $281 million in 2024) under budget.

Despite recent speculation about the possibility of the Sam Houston Tollway being sold by HCTRA to a private firm, the Harris County Commissioners Court unanimously voted to keep the tollway in the hands of HCTRA.

On September 3, 2007, the toll increased by $0.25 system wide with some exceptions.

On February 26, 2011, construction of the main lanes between I-69/US 59 (Eastex Freeway) and US 90 (Crosby Freeway) was completed, thus completing the entire beltway system. This section was originally set to be completed between 2007 and 2009, but funding issues delayed its completion. The project cost $400 million (equivalent to $567 million in 2024) and was completed ahead of schedule and under budget. An EZ Tag (or an interoperable toll tag) was always required to access the 13-mile (21 km) section. Almost 60 years had passed between the planning of Beltway 8 and the opening of the final section.

On August 28, 2017, Hurricane Harvey caused flooding to the West Belt and caused damage near I-10.

== Exit list ==
The entire route is in Harris County. All exits are unnumbered.

| Location | mi | km | Destinations | Notes |
|---|---|---|---|---|
| Pasadena | 0.00 | 0.00 | SH 225 – Deer Park, Houston | Last free counterclockwise exit before EZ TAG Only toll plaza at Sam Houston Ship Channel Bridge |
| Pasadena | | | Red Bluff Road / Pasadena Boulevard | Tolled clockwise entrance and counterclockwise exit |
| Pasadena | | | Spencer Highway / Vista Road / Pine Street | Tolled clockwise entrance and counterclockwise exit |
| Pasadena | | | Fairmont Parkway / Vista Road | Access to Bayshore Medical Center |
| Pasadena | | | Sam Houston East Mainlane Plaza; Electronic toll tags or pay online (cash collection suspended due to COVID-19) | |
| Pasadena | | | Genoa-Red Bluff Road / Preston Road / Crenshaw Road | Clockwise exit is via the Spencer Highway exit; last counterclockwise exit before toll plaza |
| Houston | 7.5 | 12.1 | SH 3 (Old Galveston Road) | |
| Houston | | | I-45 – Galveston, Houston | I-45 exit 32 |
| Houston | | | Sabo Road | Clockwise exit and counterclockwise entrance |
| Houston | | | Beamer Road / Sabo Road / Hughes Road | Last free clockwise exit before toll road resumes; Sabo Road signed on counterclockwise exit; access to Memorial Hermann Southeast Hospital |
| Houston | | | Blackhawk Road | Tolled clockwise exit and counterclockwise entrance |
| Houston | | | Pearland Parkway / Monroe Road | Tolled clockwise exit and counterclockwise entrance |
| Houston | | | SH 35 (Telephone Road) – Hobby Airport | No clockwise entrance |
| Houston | | | Mykawa Road | Counterclockwise exit and clockwise entrance |
| Houston | | | South Wayside Drive | Tolled clockwise exit and counterclockwise entrance |
| Houston | | | Sam Houston Southeast Mainlane Plaza; Electronic toll tags or pay online (cash collection suspended due to COVID-19) | |
| Houston | | | FM 865 (Cullen Boulevard) / Scott Street | Tolled clockwise entrance and counterclockwise exit |
| Houston | | | SH 288 / Fellows Road | Non-toll access to SH 288 (South Freeway) via frontage road |
| Houston | | | SH 288 Toll / Brazoria County Expressway – Lake Jackson, Freeport, Downtown Houston | Direct ramps to SH 288 (South Freeway) via SH 288's toll lanes |
| | | | Kirby Drive | Counterclockwise exit and clockwise entrance |
| | | | Sam Houston Southwest Mainlane Plaza; Electronic toll tags or pay online (cash collection suspended due to COVID-19) | |
| | | | FM 521 (Almeda Road) | Tolled clockwise entrance and counterclockwise exit |
| Houston | | | South Post Oak Road | Counterclockwise exit is via the West Fuqua Street exit |
| Houston | | | West Fuqua Street | Tolled clockwise entrance and counterclockwise exit |
| Houston | | | Fort Bend Tollway north / Fort Bend Parkway Toll Road south / Hillcroft Avenue | Tolled clockwise entrance and counterclockwise exit; access to Fort Bend Toll Road via frontage roads and Hillcroft Avenue |
| Houston | | | Fondren Road | Counterclockwise exit is via the US 90 Alt. exit |
| Missouri City | | | US 90 Alt. (South Main Street) | Tolled clockwise entrance and counterclockwise exit |
| Missouri City | | | South Gessner Road | Counterclockwise exit is via West Airport Boulevard |
| Houston | | | West Airport Boulevard | Last free counterclockwise exit before toll road resumes |
| Houston | | | West Bellfort Boulevard | |
| Houston | 31.1 | 50.1 | I-69 / US 59 – Victoria, Downtown Houston | I-69/US 59 exit 115 (115B southbound) to tollway; 115C southbound to frontage roads |
| Houston | | | Beltway 8 (Frontage Road) | Counterclockwise exit only |
| Houston | 32.2 | 51.8 | Bissonnet Street | Counterclockwise exit and clockwise entrance |
| Houston | | | Beechnut Street | Last free clockwise exit before toll road resumes |
| Houston | | | Bellaire Boulevard / Westpark Drive | Tolled clockwise exit and counterclockwise entrance |
| Houston | | | Westpark Tollway | Tolled clockwise exits (direct connectors to Westpark Tollway east and west) and counterclockwise entrances; access to Westpark Tollway west from counterclockwise Sam Houston Tollway via frontage road |
| Houston | 36.3 | 58.4 | FM 1093 (Westheimer Road) / Richmond Avenue | Counterclockwise entrance and clockwise exit |
| Houston | | | Briar Forest Drive | Tolled clockwise exit and counterclockwise entrance |
| Houston | | | Sam Houston South Mainlane Plaza; Electronic toll tags or pay online (cash collection suspended due to COVID-19) | |
| Houston | | | Deerwood Drive | Counterclockwise tolled exit only |
| Houston | | | Boheme Drive | Clockwise exit only |
| Houston | | | Memorial Drive | Clockwise exit and counterclockwise entrance |
| Houston | 39.6 | 63.7 | I-10 (US 90) – San Antonio, Downtown Houston | I-10 exit 756 eastbound, 756B westbound |
| Houston | | | Westview Drive | Counterclockwise exit and clockwise entrance |
| Houston | | | Hammerly Boulevard / Kempwood Drive | Tolled clockwise exit and counterclockwise entrance |
| Houston | | | Clay Road / Tanner Road / Kempwood Drive | Tolled clockwise exit and counterclockwise entrance |
| Houston | | | Sam Houston Central Mainlane Plaza; Electronic toll tags or pay online (cash collection suspended due to COVID-19) | |
| Houston | | | West Little York Road | Clockwise exit and counterclockwise entrance |
| Houston | 46.0 | 74.0 | US 290 – Austin, Downtown Houston | |
| | | | West Road / Philippine Street | |
| | | | Fallbrook Drive / Windfern Road | Tolled clockwise exit and counterclockwise entrance; counterclockwise exit is via the Gessner Road exit, access to Cypress Fairbanks Medical Center |
| | | | Gessner Road / Fairbanks North Houston Road | Tolled clockwise exit and counterclockwise entrance |
| | 52.3 | 84.2 | SH 249 / Hollister Road / Fairbanks North Houston Road – Tomball, Downtown Houston | Tolled clockwise exits and counterclockwise entrances; direct ramps to and from SH 249 northbound connect to the Sam Houston Tollway mainlanes |
| | | | Sam Houston North Mainlane Plaza; Electronic toll tags or pay online (cash collection suspended due to COVID-19) | |
| | | | Antoine Drive / Bammel North Houston Road | Clockwise exit is via the SH 249 exit |
| | | | Veterans Memorial Drive / T.C. Jester Boulevard | Counterclockwise exit is via the last free exit for Ella Boulevard |
| Houston | | | Beltway 8 (Frontage Road) / Greens Crossing / Ella Boulevard | Last free counterclockwise exit before toll road resumes |
| Houston | 58.5 | 94.1 | I-45 – Dallas, Downtown Houston | I-45 exit 60B southbound, 60C-D northbound |
| Houston | | | Greenspoint Drive | |
| Houston | | | Imperial Valley Drive | Clockwise exit is via the Greenspoint Drive exit; clockwise exit and counterclockwise entrance (ramps closed until June 2025), counterclockwise access is via Greenpoint Drive exit |
| Houston | | | Hardy Toll Road | Clockwise traffic has direct ramp to Hardy Toll Road northbound; no counterclockwise entrance (closed until June 2025) |
| | | | Aldine-Westfield Road | Clockwise entrance and counterclockwise exit (ramps closed until June 2025); clockwise access is via JFK Boulevard exit |
| Houston | | | JFK Boulevard / Vickery Drive - Bush Intercontinental Airport | Vickery Drive signed clockwise only |
| Houston | | | Intercontinental Airport | Clockwise exit and entrance, respectively, to northbound and from southbound JFK Boulevard |
| Houston | | | Lee Road / Vickery Drive | Vickery Drive signed counterclockwise only |
| Houston | 65.6 | 105.6 | I-69 / US 59 – Cleveland, Houston | I-69/US 59 exit 144A; 144B southbound to frontage roads |
| | | | Mesa Drive | Last free clockwise exit before EZ TAG Only section of toll road begins |
| | | | Wilson Road | Tolled clockwise exit and counterclockwise entrance |
| | | | John Ralston Road / Lockwood Road | Tolled clockwise exit and counterclockwise entrance |
| | | | West Lake Houston Parkway | Tolled clockwise exit and counterclockwise entrance |
| | | | Sam Houston Northeast Mainlane Gantry; Electronic toll tags only, no cash allowed | |
| | | | Generation Parkway / North Lake Houston Parkway / CE King Parkway/ FM 526 | Tolled clockwise entrance and counterclockwise exit; Generation Parkway was formerly Winfield Road |
| | | | Garrett Road / Little York Road | Tolled clockwise entrance and counterclockwise exit |
| | | | US 90 (Crosby Freeway) / Tidwell Road – Liberty, Houston | Last free counterclockwise exit before EZ TAG Only section of toll road begins; access to Crosby Freeway via frontage road |
| | | | Wallisville Road | |
| | | | Woodforest Boulevard | |
| | | | Market Street | Counterclockwise exit and clockwise entrance |
| | 83.13 | 133.78 | I-10 – Beaumont, Houston | I-10 exit 781A westbound, 781B eastbound |
| | | | Jacinto Port Boulevard | Clockwise exit and counterclockwise entrance Last free clockwise exit before EZ TAG Only toll plaza |
| | | | Ship Channel Bridge Mainlane Gantry; Electronic toll tags only, no cash allowed | |
| Pasadena | 88.1 | 141.8 | Jesse H. Jones Memorial Bridge/Sam Houston Ship Channel Bridge | |
1.000 mi = 1.609 km; 1.000 km = 0.621 mi: Incomplete access; Tolled
