= West Lake Houston Parkway =

Highway in metro Houston, Texas, USA

The West Lake Houston Parkway serves as a major access road between the developing portion of Beltway 8 and the neighborhoods of Summerwood, Atascocita and Kingwood in the Greater Houston Area. The start of the road is just west of the beltway in a developing neighborhood. The northern end is at the entrance to northern area of Royal Brook in Kingwood, Texas.

== Route description ==
The West Lake Houston parkway starts just inside the developing portion of the Beltway 8 in a developing neighborhood. The parkway heads east, passing the beltway and passes through the neighborhood of Summerwood. In the neighborhood, the parkway turns north. The parkway passes through a very rural area as it heads north towards Atascocita. In Atascocita, the parkway makes an intersection with FM 1960. At this point the parkway becomes a major road. The parkway continues north through Atascocita and eventually crosses Lake Houston. The parkway then passes into Kingwood. The parkway becomes minor at Northpark Drive. The parkway continues minor until its ending in Northern Kingwood.
