= Plateau, Texas =

Plateau
- Unincorporated community
- Location within Texas Location within the United States
- Coordinates: 31°06′23″N 104°50′19″W
- Country: United States
- State: Texas
- County: Culberson
- Named for: Its location on a plateau

Population (1990)
  - Total: 5
- Time zone: UTC−6 (Central (CST))
- ZIP code: 79855
- Area code: 432

Plateau is an unincorporated community in Culberson County, Texas, United States, located along the Toyah Subdivision of the Union Pacific Railroad and Interstate 10, 16 mi (26 km) east of Van Horn.

== History ==
In the 1880s, a section house in Plateau was built for the Texas and Pacific Railroad which once passed through the site. A post office was established in 1907. In 1914, the community had an estimated population of 20 and a general store. The post office closed in 1916 after only nine years of service; however, the population continued to increase, reaching 50 inhabitants in the 1940s. By the 1960s, the population of Plateau dropped to only four residents, but then increased to five a few years later, where it remained in the 1990 census. Plateau is now the site of the Plateau Truck Stop, which has a convenience store, truck and automobile gas stations, and a tire store.
