= Sam Houston Ship Channel Bridge =

Sam Houston Tollway Ship Channel Bridge
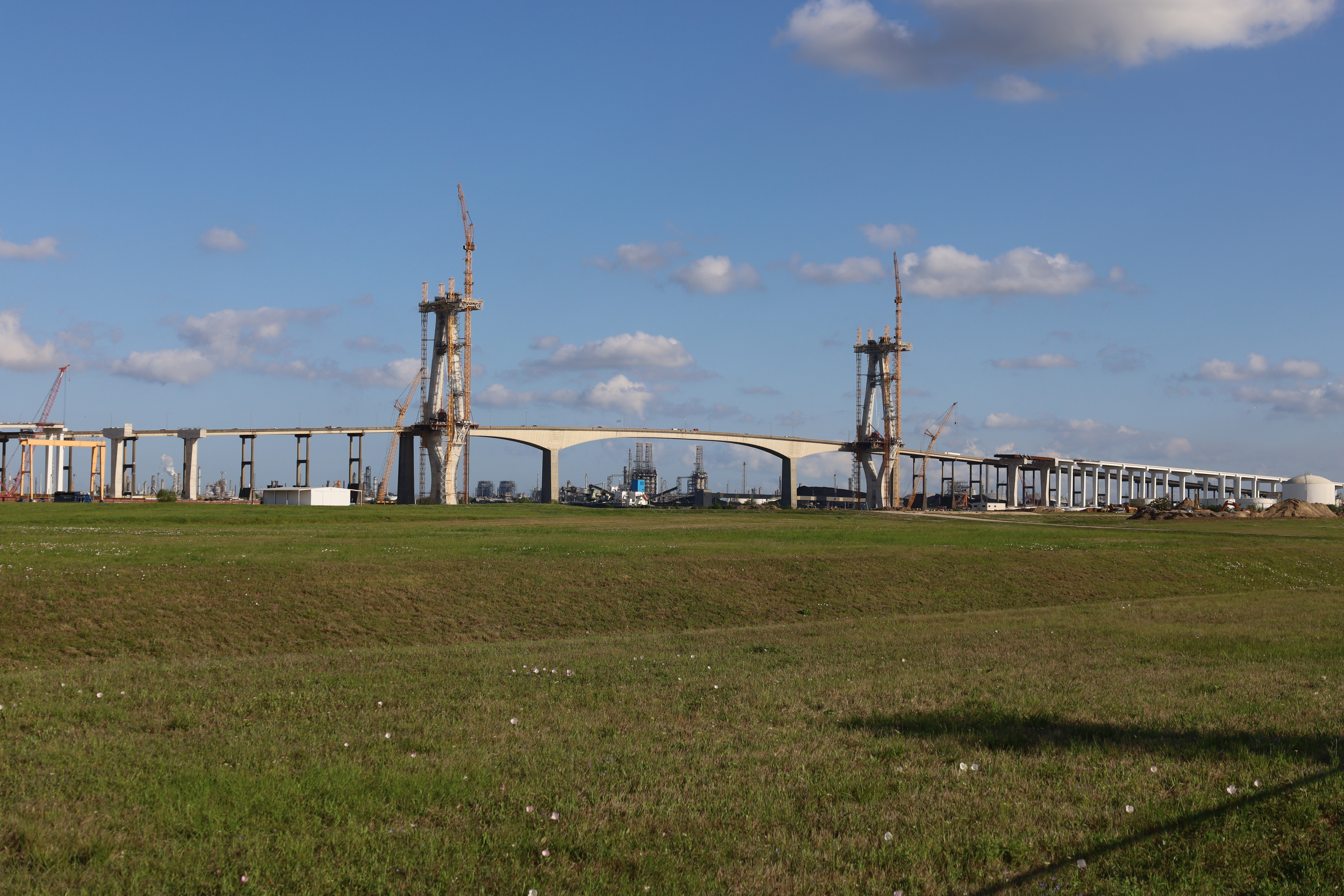
- The old bridge behind construction of the new bridge in 2026
- Coordinates: 29.73597°N 95.146227°W
- Carries: Sam Houston Tollway
- Crosses: Houston Ship Channel
- Locale: Harris County, Texas
- Maintained by: Harris County Toll Road Authority

Characteristics
- Design: cantilevered concrete trapezoidal haunched hollow box girder bridge
- Material: Concrete
- Total length: 1,560 feet (480 m) (main bridge); 2 miles (3.2 km) (total length)
- Width: 59 feet (18 m)
- Longest span: 750 feet (230 m)
- Clearance below: 175 feet (53 m)

History
- Construction start: 1980
- Construction end: 1982
- Opened: May 6, 1982

Location
- Interactive map of Sam Houston Tollway Ship Channel Bridge

Sam Houston Tollway Ship Channel Bridge (formerly known as the Jesse H. Jones Memorial Bridge) is a span in Harris County, Texas. It was acquired from the then–Texas Turnpike Authority (TTA) (now North Texas Tollway Authority) on May 5, 1994, and is now a part of the Harris County Toll Road Authority system. The bridge opened to traffic in May 1982 and carries four lanes of the Sam Houston Tollway over the Houston Ship Channel with a clearance of 175 feet (53 m).

== Conception ==
The 1952 City of Houston planning document recommended a second loop designated the Outer Belt. Harris County took control of the project in 1960. Efforts to construct the Beltway 8 crossing started in the mid-1960s, culminating in an effort vetoed by Governor John Connally on June 18, 1967. Voters twice rejected bond funds for the bridge, so the effort was reconstituted as a toll bridge. This did not work at that time.

In 1978, the Texas Turnpike Authority performed a study showing the project as feasible, and sold $102M (approximately $333.1M in 2008) of bonds to fund it.

Among designs considered, a cable-stayed design was studied, but not sufficiently understood at the time. Such was later used on the Fred Hartman Bridge, but in 1978 when this bridge was designed, the only U.S. example of a cable-stayed bridge was the Ed Hendler Bridge, meaning there was a deficiency of design and construction experience for the bridge type.

== Construction and financing ==
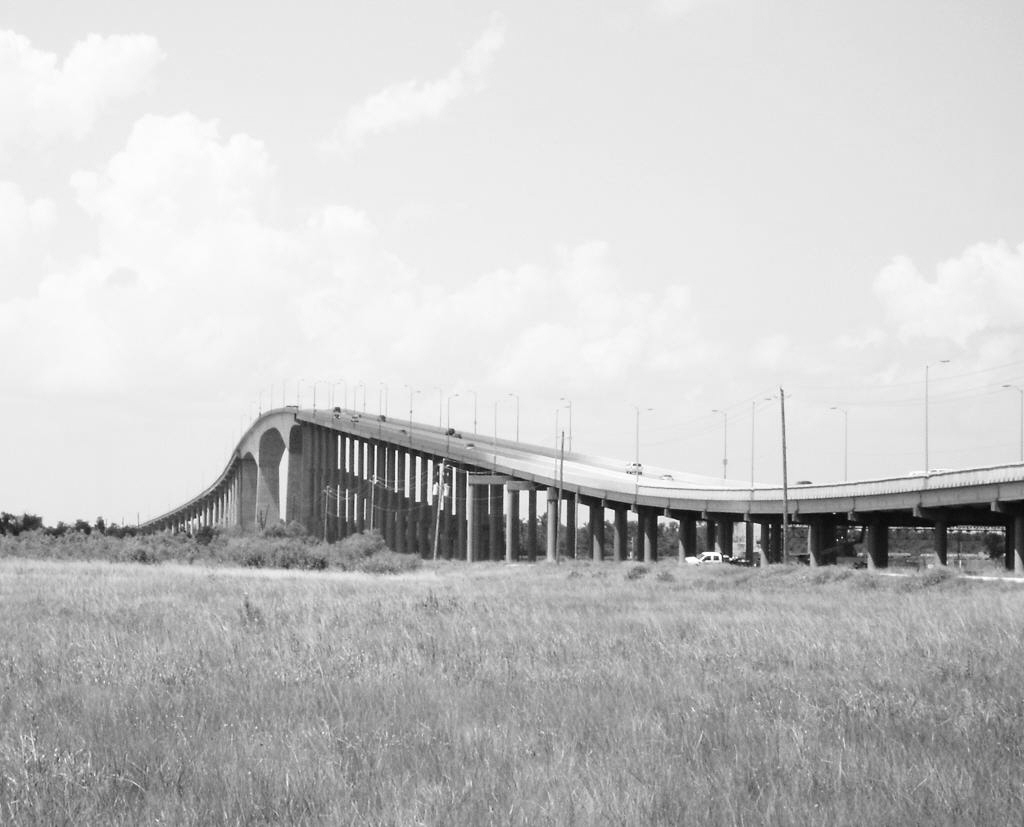
The original bridge in 2006

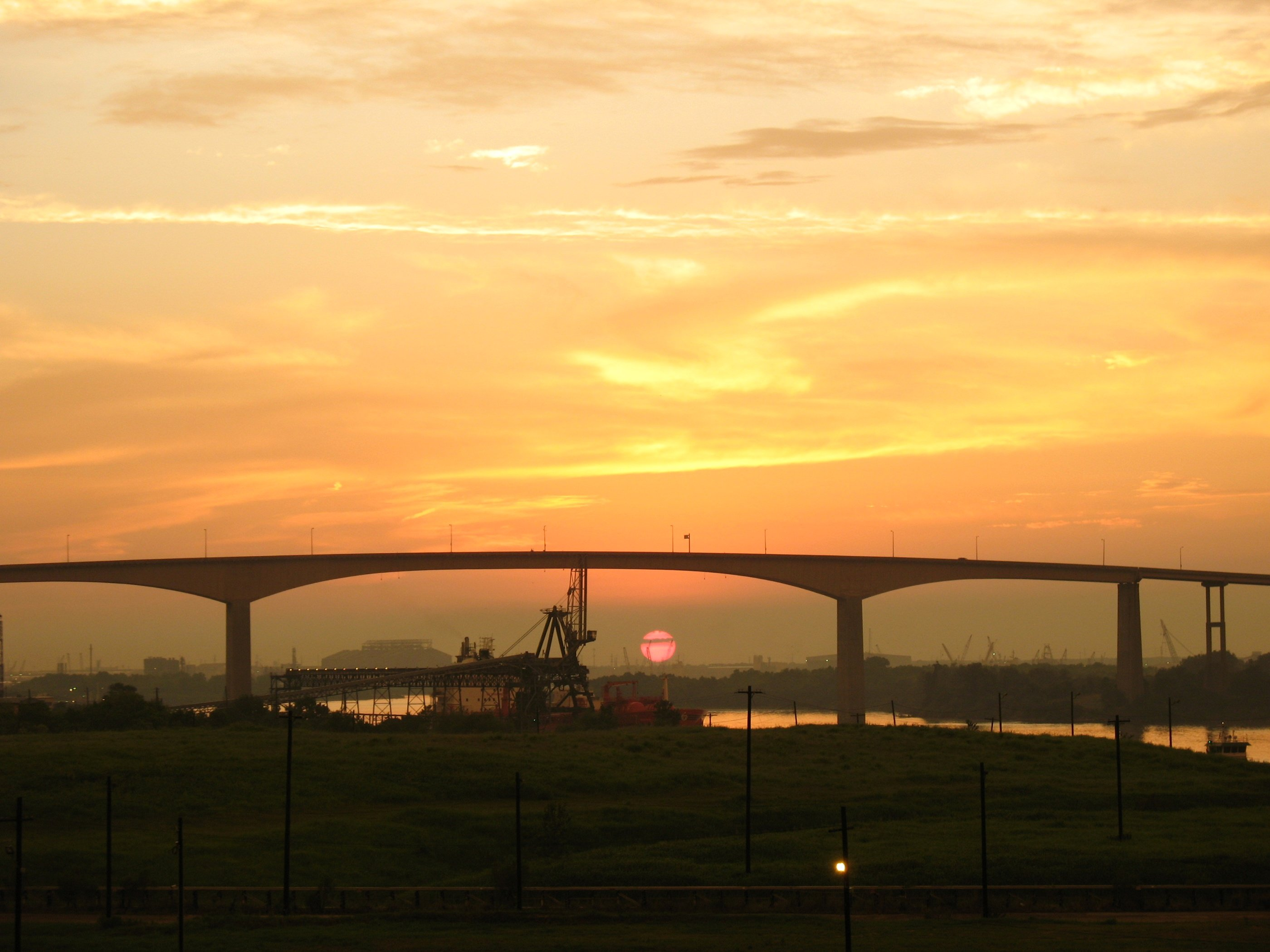
The bridge at sunset in 2008

The bridge and surroundings in 2014

Construction completed in 1982 and the bridge was opened on May 6. At the time of completion, the bridge was the longest box girder span in the Western Hemisphere, which record it held until 1997 and the opening of the Confederation Bridge. It is no longer in the top 20 of longest box girder spans.

Traffic volume had been projected to be 4 million vehicles in 1982, but came in at only 1.69 million, a 58-percent shortfall. This was attributed to a lack of connections to the bridge. Additional ramps were completed in 1984, but the results were insufficient to service the bonds. The bonds were refinanced in 1985 at a rate of 12.625 percent (original rate was 7.54 percent), and could not be paid-off until July 1, 2002. Total debt service as of the end of 1985 was $522M, with a minimum of $176M.

Traffic volume increased, but not sufficiently to cover the 1985 junk bonds. In 1994, Harris County took over the bridge for the consideration of TxDOT contributing money toward further area highway construction. By 2002, the average toll of $2 brought in approximately $20M, enough to cover bond payments.

On January 8, 2016, cash tolls were eliminated and the toll bridge became EZ TAG only; According to the Texas Department of Transportation, this removed the toll plazas into the bridge and drivers going to the bridge will need an EZ Tag. This is because of a widening project.

== Future ==
In 2018, construction began on a twin-span cable-stayed bridge to replace the existing one. The replacement bridge was initially designed by Figg Engineering Group and the contractor for the project is Ship Channel Constructors, a joint venture between Traylor Brothers Inc. and Zachry Construction Corp. When completed, each bridge will carry 4 lanes of one-way traffic. The bridges would have taken three years each to be completed, with the southbound bridge initially set for completion in 2021 and the northbound bridge in 2024.

However, construction suffered serious delays due to detection of design flaws that would otherwise have resulted in a catastrophic collapse, resulting in Figg's design being abandoned. As of December 2021, completion of the first span was set for 2025, and the second span in 2027. As of September 2026, completion of the first span is set for spring 2027, and the second span by the end of 2030. When the southbound bridge is completed the existing bridge will be demolished and the northbound bridge will be built in its footprint. The electronic tolling started in 2016 will continue throughout the duration of the project.

== See also ==
- Sidney Sherman Bridge
- Fred Hartman Bridge
