= Fast Lane (electronic toll collection) =

Electronic toll collection system

- Product type: Electronic toll collection systems; transponders
- Produced by: E-ZPass
- Country: United States
- Introduced: 1998; 28 years ago
- Discontinued: 2012; 14 years ago
- Markets: Massachusetts; Massachusetts Turnpike; Sumner Tunnel; Ted Williams Tunnel; Tobin Bridge

Fast Lane was an electronic toll collection system within the U.S. state of Massachusetts. It was created in 1998 by the Massachusetts Turnpike Authority (MTA), and was fully interoperable with the multi-state E-ZPass network. Fast Pass was used for toll collection on the Massachusetts Turnpike throughout the state, and the Sumner Tunnel, Ted Williams Tunnel, and Tobin Bridge in and around Boston. Fast Lane was previously sponsored by FleetBoston Financial, Citizens Bank, and TD Bank. The Massachusetts Department of Transportation (MassDOT) rebranded Fast Lane to E-ZPass and ended corporate sponsorship in 2012.

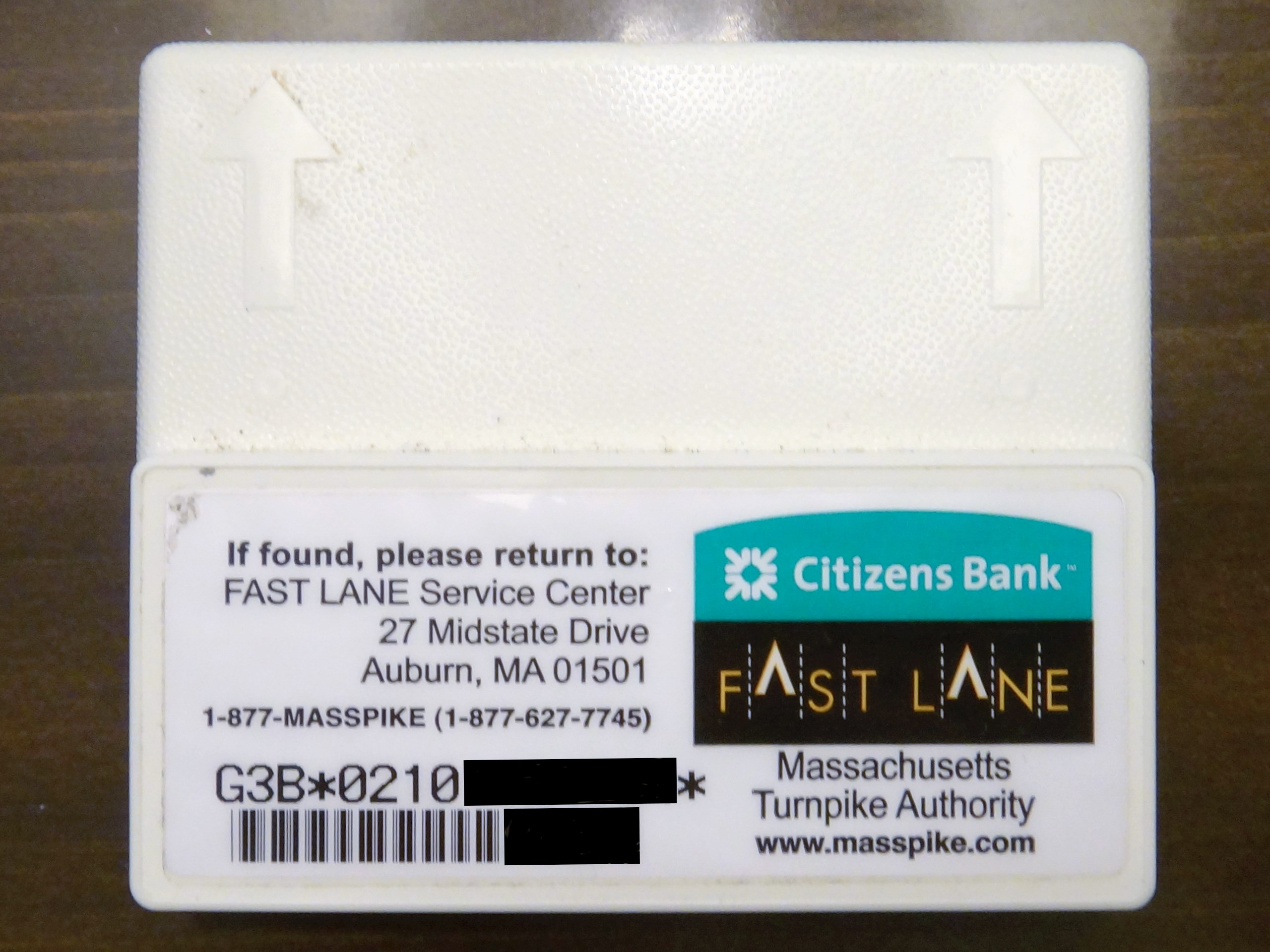
A typical Fast Lane branded transponder

== History ==
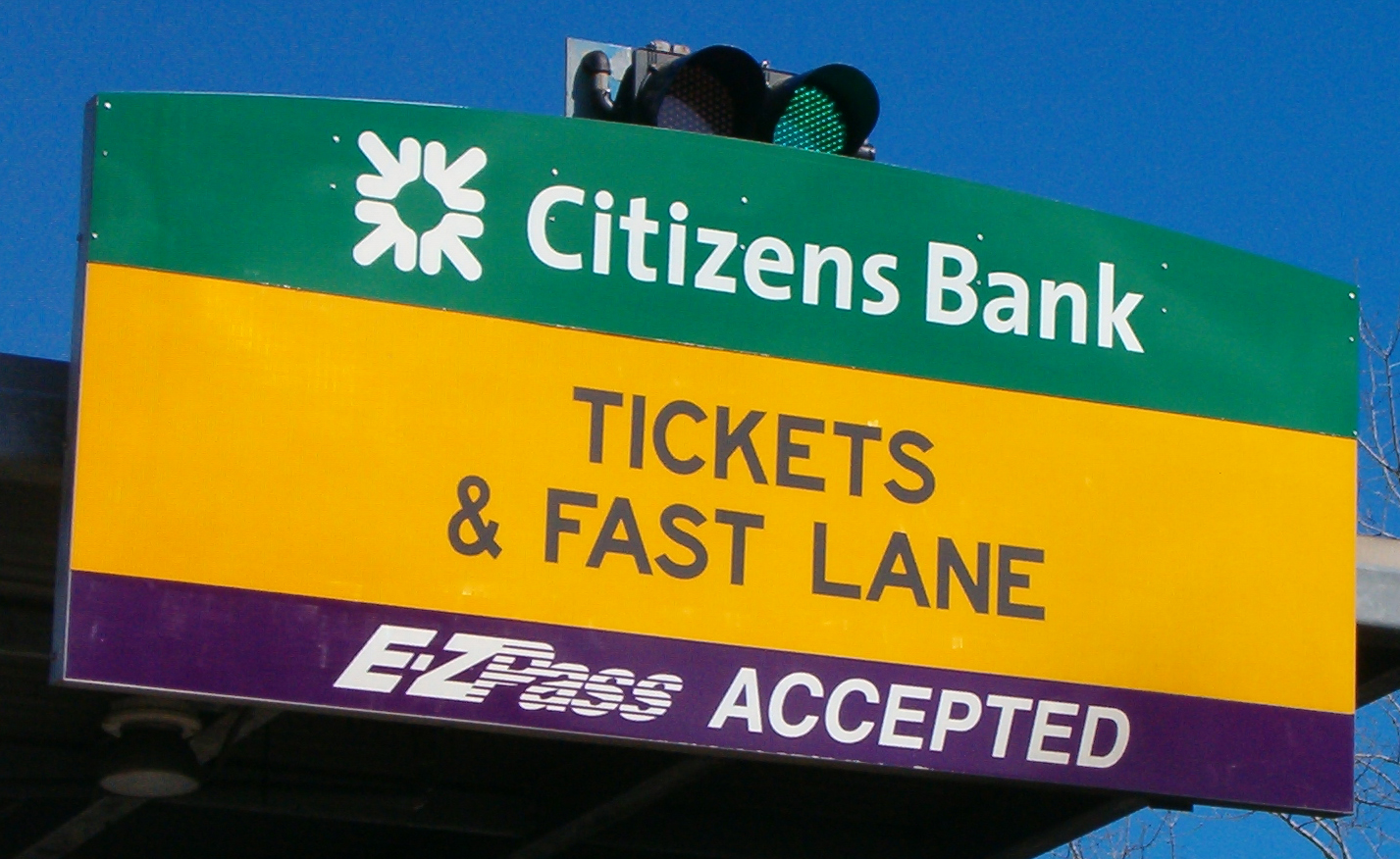
Toll booth at the junction of I-84 and the Mass Pike (exit 9).

The original electronic toll collection system in Massachusetts was called MassPass and was installed at the Ted Williams Tunnel. This system was scrapped and replaced by the current E-ZPass-compatible system in 1998 for the Ted Williams Tunnel and the Massachusetts Turnpike Boston extension and extended to the rest of the turnpike in 1999.

When the system was first introduced, AAA gave out to its Western Massachusetts members an orange Fast Lane pass. This pass could be used from exits 3 to 51 (old exits 1 to 6) without toll because these exits did not previously charge tolls. The orange passes were eliminated when tolls were reinstated on that section of the Turnpike on October 15, 2013.

In 2011, MassDOT announced that the Fast Lane branding would be dropped beginning in mid-2012 and rebranded to the typical E-ZPass and switch to the purple and white signage. This has occurred along all tolls, officially phasing out Fast Lane in itself.

== Sponsors ==
The system was sponsored by Citizens Bank for the Massachusetts Turnpike and tunnels, and by TD Bank, N.A. for the Tobin Bridge (formerly administered by the separate Massachusetts Port Authority). Along the Turnpike it was branded the Citizens Bank Fast Lane, whereas at the Tobin Bridge it was branded TD Bank Fast Lane. Until 2005, Fleet Bank sponsored the Fast Lane system. It inherited the sponsorship upon merging with BankBoston, the founding financial institution of the local system along with the Massachusetts Turnpike.

== Cost ==
The Massachusetts Turnpike Authority originally charged a one-time fee to buy the transponder. They had planned to replace that charge with a $0.50 monthly fee, but both fees were eliminated due to criticism of Massachusetts Turnpike Easter Sunday congestion in 2009.

=== Discounts ===
"Fast Lane"/"E-Z Pass MA" subscribers from any state receive (over cash or E-Z Pass customers subscribed via other states) a 25¢ discount at Allston-Brighton tolls, 50¢ discount at Sumner and Ted Williams tunnels and Tobin Memorial Bridge.

Several discounts are available with a special transponder obtained by application:

- Residents of Charlestown and Chelsea pay $0.30 on Tobin Bridge.
- Residents of East Boston, South Boston, and North End pay $0.40 at Sumner and Ted Williams tunnels.
- Carpools with 3 or more passengers receive various discounts.

=== Legality of discounts ===
The legality and constitutionality of offering discounts to holders of transponders issued by Massachusetts as opposed to transponders issued by other states has been upheld twice at the federal appellate level, in 2003 by the First Circuit in a case arising out of Massachusetts and in 2010 by the Third Circuit in a case arising out of New Jersey. Significantly, both courts based their rulings on the fact that Massachusetts transponders are available on equal terms to in-state and out-of-state residents and that anyone is allowed to have a transponder from more than one state at a time, choosing which transponder to use in each toll transaction to obtain the cheaper rate. The court in the New Jersey case noted parenthetically that "...out-of-state residents who commute regularly to Boston each day might very well decide to carry only a [Massachusetts] Fast Lane transponder."
