= Toll tunnel =

Road tunnel with a monetary charge

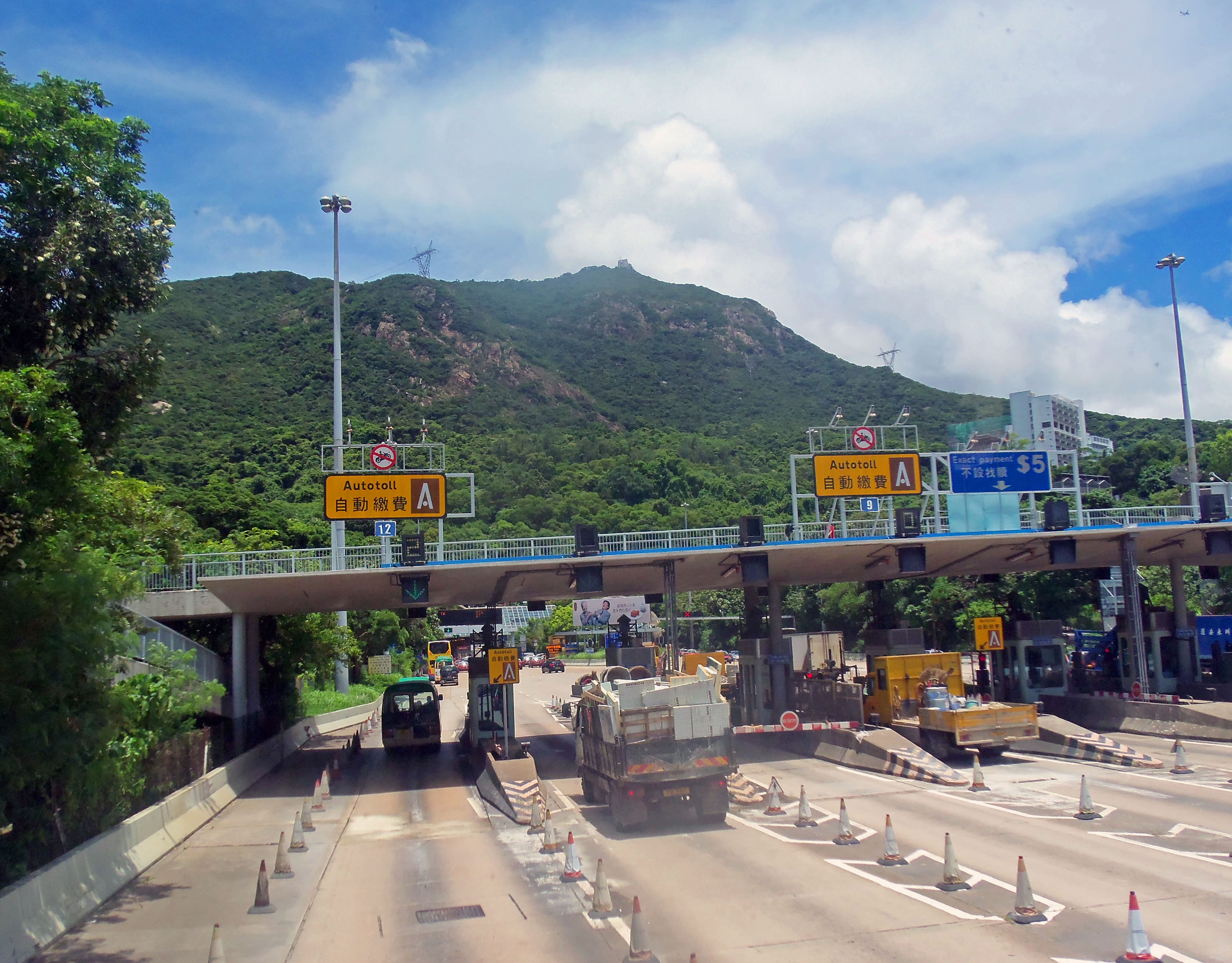
Toll booths at the approach to the Aberdeen Tunnel in Hong Kong

A toll tunnel is a road tunnel where a monetary charge (or toll) is required to pass through. This is done by a gate before entering the tunnel or online.

== List of toll tunnels ==
=== United States ===
| Tunnel name | Operated by | Road carried | Passes under | Length | | Cash tolls (automobile) | Notes |
| Tunnel name | Operated by | Road carried | Passes under | (ft) | (m) | Cash tolls (automobile) | Notes |
Alaska
| Anton Anderson Memorial Tunnel | Alaska DOT & PF | Portage Glacier Highway | Maynard Mountain | 13,300 | 4,054 | $13.00 | Cash and credit card (tolls eastbound only) |
Maryland
| Baltimore Harbor Tunnel | Maryland Transportation Authority | I-895 | Patapsco River | 7,650 | 2,332 | $4.00 | E-ZPass or pay-by-plate |
| Fort McHenry Tunnel | Maryland Transportation Authority | I-95 | Patapsco River | 7,200 | 2,195 | $4.00 | E-ZPass or pay-by-plate |
Massachusetts
| Callahan Tunnel | Massachusetts DOT | Route 1A Northbound | Boston Harbor | 5,069 | 1,545 | $2.05 | E-ZPass or pay-by-plate |
| Sumner Tunnel | Massachusetts DOT | Route 1A Southbound | Boston Harbor | 5,650 | 1,722 | $2.05 | E-ZPass or pay-by-plate |
| Ted Williams Tunnel | Massachusetts DOT | I-90 | Boston Harbor | 8,448 | 2,575 | $2.05 | E-ZPass or pay-by-plate |
Michigan / Ontario, Canada
| Detroit-Windsor Tunnel | Detroit-Windsor Tunnel Company, LLC | M-3 | Detroit River | 5,150 | 1,570 | $5.00 | Cash, credit card, or Nexpress |
New Jersey / New York
| Holland Tunnel | Port Authority of NY & NJ | I-78 | Hudson River | 8,558 | 2,608 | $16.00 | E-ZPass or pay-by-plate (tolls eastbound only) |
| Lincoln Tunnel | Port Authority of NY & NJ | Route 495 / NY 495 | Hudson River | 8,216 | 2,504 | $16.00 | E-ZPass or pay-by-plate (tolls eastbound only) |
New York
| Brooklyn-Battery Tunnel | Metropolitan Transportation Authority | I-478 | East River | 9,117 | 2,779 | $6.94 (NY E-ZPass) $9.11 (mid-tier) $11.19 (non-NY E-ZPass and pay-by-plate) | E-ZPass or pay-by-plate. Mid-tier tolls are charged for NY EZ-Pass customers who are not using EZ-Pass transponders. |
| Queens-Midtown Tunnel | Metropolitan Transportation Authority | I-495 | East River | 6,414 | 1,955 | $6.94 (NY E-ZPass) $9.11 (mid-tier) $11.19 (non-NY E-ZPass and pay-by-plate) | E-ZPass or pay-by-plate. Mid-tier tolls are charged for NY EZ-Pass customers who are not using EZ-Pass transponders. |
Texas
| Addison Airport Toll Tunnel | North Texas Tollway Authority | Keller Springs Road | Addison Airport | 1,600 | 488 | $0.53 | TollTag or pay-by-plate |
Virginia
| Downtown Tunnel | Elizabeth River Crossings | I-264 | Elizabeth River | 3,813 | 1,162 | $4.00 | E-ZPass or pay-by-plate |
| Midtown Tunnel | Elizabeth River Crossings | US 58 | Elizabeth River | 4,194 | 1,278 | | E-ZPass or pay-by-plate |
Washington
| Alaskan Way Viaduct replacement tunnel | Washington State Department of Transportation | SR 99 | Downtown Seattle | 9,270 | 2,825 | $1–2.25 | Good to Go or pay-by-plate |

==== Tolls removed ====
- Hampton Roads Bridge–Tunnel, between Hampton and Norfolk, Virginia

=== South Africa ===
- Huguenot Tunnel, South Africa

=== United Kingdom ===
- Dartford Crossing, Kent to Essex
- Kingsway Tunnel, Wallasey to Liverpool
- Queensway Tunnel, Birkenhead to Liverpool
- Tyne Tunnel, North Shields to South Shields
- Blackwall Tunnel, Tower Hamlets to Greenwich
- Silvertown Tunnel, Newham to Greenwich (2025)

=== Ireland ===
- Dublin Port Tunnel, Dublin
- Limerick Tunnel, Limerick

=== Türkiye ===
- Göcek Tunnel, Muğla
- Eurasia(Turkish:Avrasya) Tunnel, İstanbul

=== Australia ===
- Burnley and Domain Tunnels, CityLink, Melbourne
- Melba and Mullum-Mullum Tunnels, EastLink, Melbourne
- Bundawanh and Eureka Tunnels, West Gate Tunnel, Melbourne
- Sydney Harbour Tunnel
- Clem Jones Tunnel, Brisbane, Queensland
- Airport Link, Brisbane, Brisbane, Queensland
- Legacy Way, Brisbane, Queensland
- WestConnex, Sydney, New South Wales
- NorthConnex, Sydney, New South Wales
- Lane Cove Tunnel, Sydney, New South Wales

=== Belgium ===
- Liefkenshoek Tunnel, Antwerp

=== Netherlands ===
- Western Scheldt Tunnel, Terneuzen to Ellewoutsdijk
- Kiltunnel, Dordrecht

==== Tolls removed ====
- Beneluxtunnel, Rotterdam

=== Montenegro ===
- Sozina Tunnel, Montenegro (2005)

=== Croatia ===
- Učka Tunnel, Croatia (1981)

=== Germany ===
- Alter Elbtunnel, Hamburg, Germany Closed to vehicles until further notice

=== Malaysia ===
- Stormwater Management and Road Tunnel (SMART Tunnel), Kuala Lumpur, Malaysia

=== Hong Kong ===
- Aberdeen Tunnel, Happy Valley to Wong Chuk
- Eagle's Nest Tunnel
- Lion Rock Tunnel, Kowloon Tong to Hin Tin
- Shing Mun Tunnels, Tsuen Wan to Sha Tin
- Tai Wai Tunnel

==== Tolls removed ====
- Tseung Kwan O Tunnel, Sau Mau Ping to Tseung Kwan O
- Kai Tak Tunnel,
- Cheung Tsing Tunnel
- Nam Wan Tunnel
- Scenic Hill Tunnel and Airport Tunnel
- Central – Wan Chai Bypass Tunnel
- Lung Shan Tunnel
- Cheung Shan Tunnel
- Tuen Mun – Chek Lap Kok Tunnel
- Tseung Kwan O – Lam Tin Tunnel
