= Ted Williams Tunnel =

Tunnel in Boston

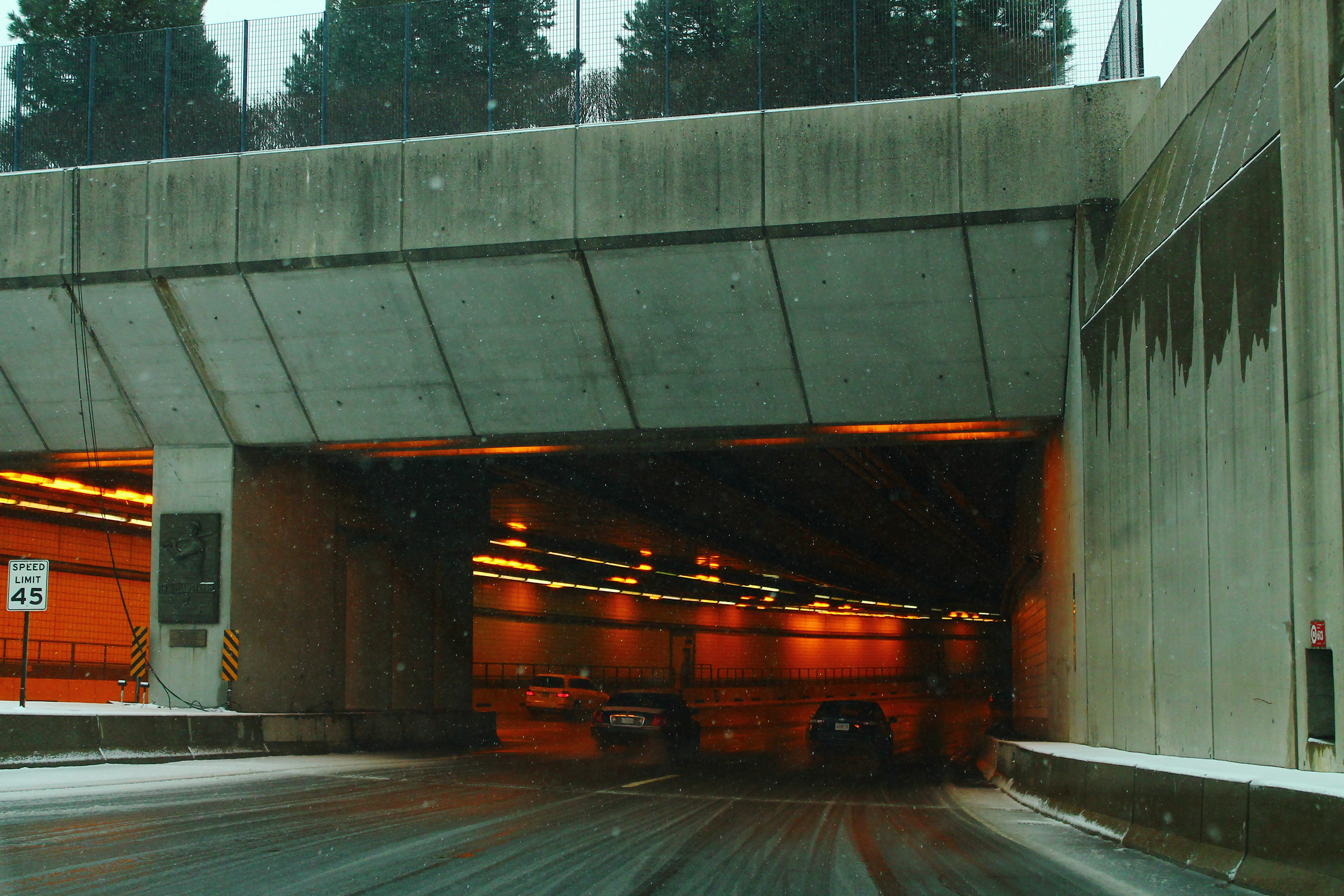
- Westbound entrance to the Ted Williams Tunnel, April 2016
- Interactive map of Ted Williams Tunnel

Overview
- Location: Boston, Massachusetts
- Coordinates: 42.3533°N 71.0283°W
- Status: Open
- Route: I-90 / Mass Pike
- Start: South Boston
- End: Logan International Airport in East Boston

Operation
- Constructed: 1991–1995
- Opened: December 15, 1995 (commercial traffic); January 18, 2003 (general traffic)
- Owner: Commonwealth of Massachusetts
- Operator: Massachusetts Department of Transportation
- Traffic: Automotive
- Toll: Between $0.20 and $2.05 both directions depending on payment method and residency

Technical
- Length: 1.6 mi (2.6 km)
- No. of lanes: 6 at ends, 4 under harbor
- Operating speed: 45 mph (72 km/h)
- Min elevation: −100 feet (−30 m)

The Ted Williams Tunnel is a highway tunnel in Boston, Massachusetts. The third in the city to travel under Boston Harbor, with the Sumner Tunnel and the Callahan Tunnel, it carries the final segment of Interstate 90 (the Massachusetts Turnpike) from South Boston towards its eastern terminus at Route 1A in East Boston, slightly beyond Logan International Airport. The tunnel is named after the Boston Red Sox baseball legend Ted Williams.

The underwater section of the tunnel is 90 feet below the surface of Boston Harbor, the deepest such connection in North America.

== History ==
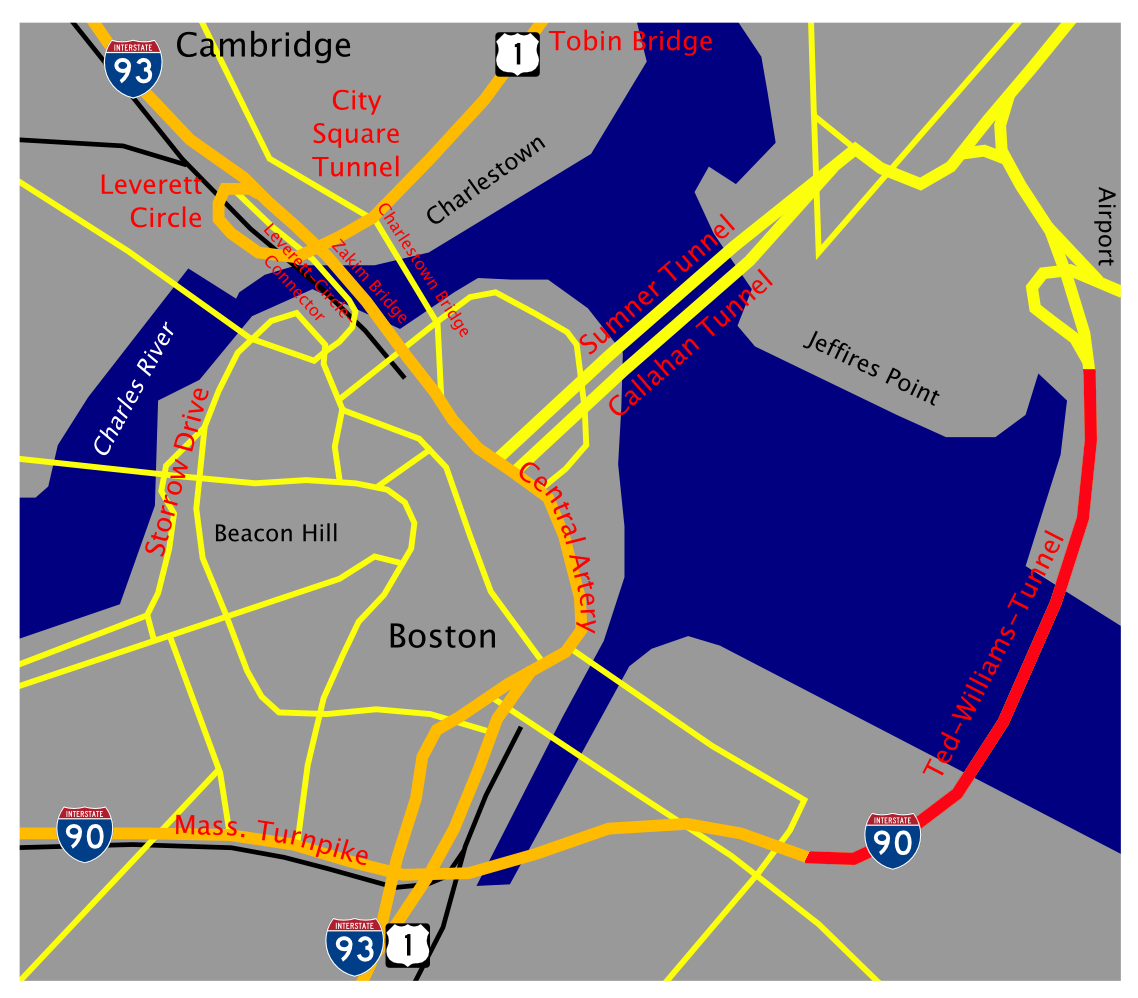
Map showing the Williams tunnel (shown in red)

The Ted Williams Tunnel (TWT) was the first major link constructed as part of Boston's Big Dig. It is constructed from twelve "binocular" shaped steel sections fabricated in a Baltimore shipyard. These sections were then brought to the Black Falcon Pier near the site and each was fitted with a large surrounding mass of concrete (so that the tunnel section was more neutrally buoyant). Using additional flotation, the tunnel sections were then floated into place, lowered into a dredged channel, and joined to the other sections. At this point, the steel panels sealing the now-joined sections could be cut out and the finishing operations could be completed.

When the TWT opened in 1995 it was only available to authorized commercial traffic. Later, non-commercial traffic was allowed to access the tunnel on weekends and holidays. In 2003, with the substantial completion of the I-90 portion of the Big Dig, the tunnel was opened to all traffic at all times.

The tunnel is 8,448 feet (2,575 m) long, of which approximately 3,960 feet (1,210 m) are underwater. A toll is collected in both directions, through the E-ZPass electronic toll collection system, formerly named the "Fast Lane" system. Vehicles with a Massachusetts E-ZPass transponder pay $1.75, and the tolls are higher for vehicles with an out of state E-ZPass or vehicles without an E-ZPass. Eligible East Boston residents for the E-ZPass discount program pay $0.20 for either direction. Commercial vehicles pay higher, depending on number of axles.

== Big Dig ceiling collapse ==
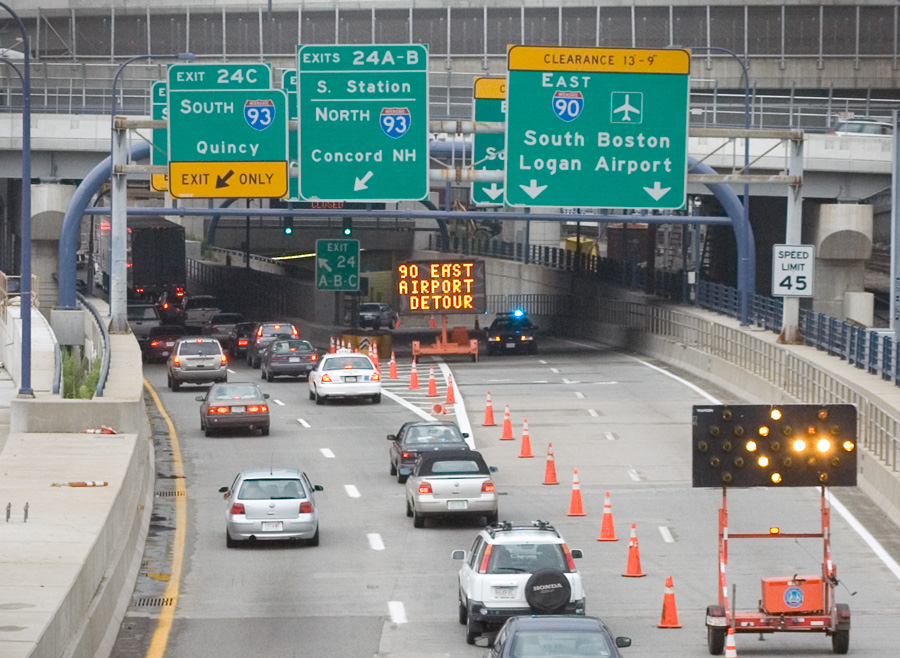
Traffic detoured onto I-93 at the South Bay Interchange after collapse.

On July 10, 2006, at approximately 11 p.m. four three-ton sections of a concrete drop ceiling inside the I-90 Fort Point Channel tunnel leading to the Ted Williams Tunnel collapsed. A section of ceiling fell on top of a car traveling through the connector tunnel, killing 38-year-old passenger Milena Del Valle and slightly injuring her husband Angel Del Valle, who was driving. The cause of the collapse was later determined to be the failure of adhesives connecting a steel tieback suspending the concrete drop ceiling to the main ceiling above. Massachusetts governor Mitt Romney ordered the eastbound lanes of the Ted Williams Tunnel to be immediately shut down on July 20 after two ceiling supports showed signs of slippage. At a press conference, Romney stated that "pull tests" were to be conducted in the eastbound tube to test the stress load on the bolt/epoxy system that supports the drop ceiling. An independent contracting firm was to conduct that test. Romney said the shutdown should last "hours, not days". The next morning, the eastbound lanes of the tunnel were opened to MBTA Silver Line buses as well as commercial buses running to Logan Airport.

Late in the evening of August 8, I-90 connector ramp A leading to the Ted Williams Tunnel was reopened to general traffic, easing the crunch on Logan Airport traffic coming from the south. Cars heading to the airport northbound on the Southeast Expressway (I-93) would get off at exit 15B (former exit 18) and take the South Boston Access (Haul) Road to Ramp A, eliminating the need to go through downtown Boston and U-turn at Storrow Drive to access the Callahan Tunnel. One eastbound lane of the connector tunnel which collapsed was reopened to traffic on September 1.

== See also ==
- Callahan Tunnel
- Massachusetts Turnpike
- Sumner Tunnel
- Thomas P. O'Neill Jr. Tunnel
- Zakim Bunker Hill Bridge
