= Tobin Bridge =

Bridge between Boston and Chelsea, Massachusetts

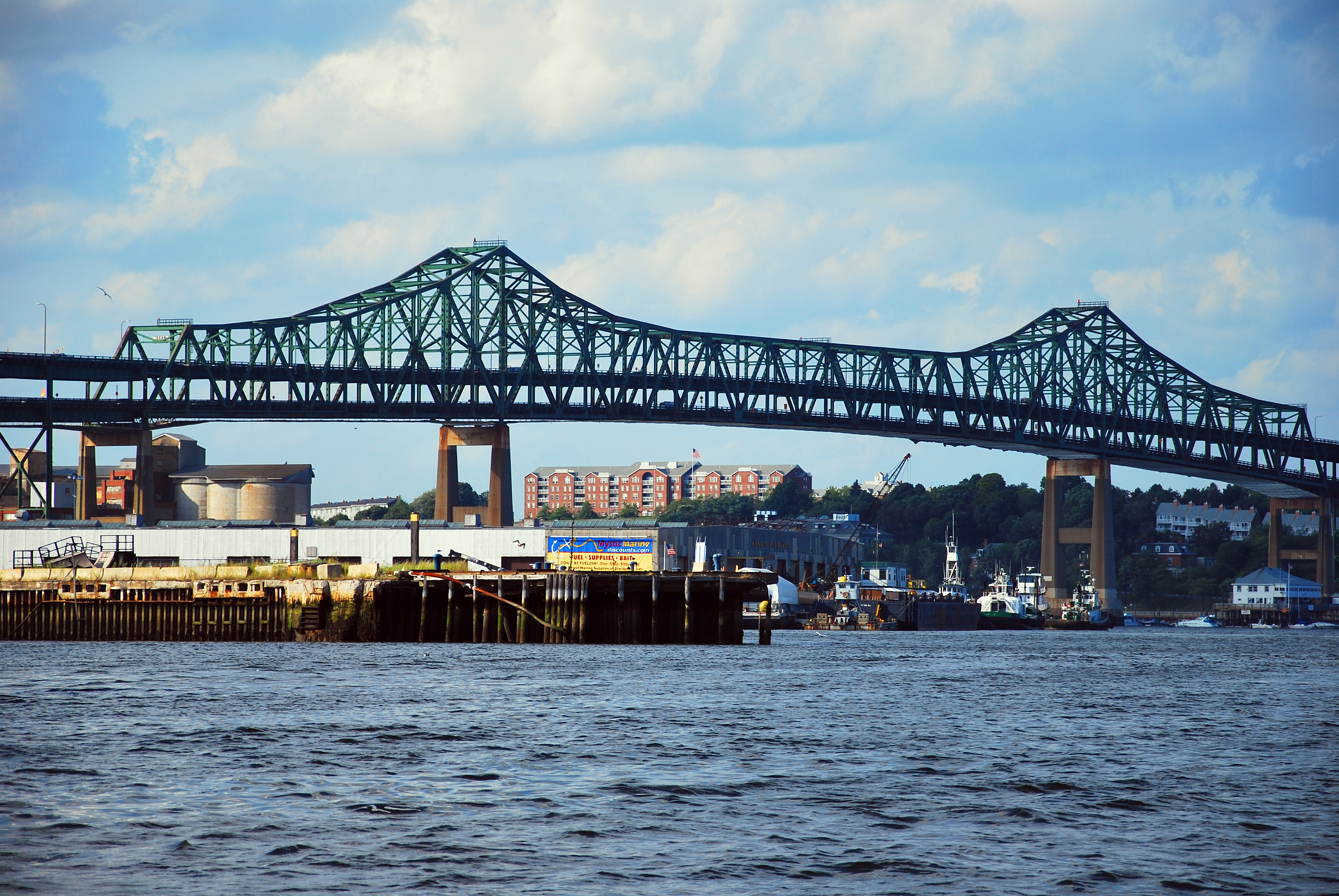
- The Tobin Bridge viewed from East Boston in 2009
- Coordinates: 42.38483°N 71.04755°W
- Carries: 6 lanes (3 upper, 3 lower) of US 1
- Crosses: Mystic River
- Locale: Charlestown–Chelsea, Massachusetts
- Official name: Maurice J. Tobin Memorial Bridge
- Maintained by: MassDOT

Characteristics
- Design: Three-span double-deck cantilevered truss
- Material: Steel
- Total length: 11,906 feet (3,629 m)
- Width: 36 feet (11 m)
- Height: 254 feet (77 m)
- Longest span: 800 feet (240 m)
- Clearance below: 135 feet (41 m)

History
- Construction start: April 12, 1948
- Opened: February 27, 1950

Statistics
- Toll: $2.50/$3.00 (E-ZPass/pay-by-plate; 2023)

Location
- Interactive map of Tobin Bridge

The Maurice J. Tobin Memorial Bridge (formerly the Mystic River Bridge) is a cantilever truss bridge that spans more than two miles (3.2 km) from Boston to Chelsea over the Mystic River in Massachusetts, United States. The bridge is the largest in New England. It is operated by the Massachusetts Department of Transportation and carries U.S. Route 1. It was built between 1948 and 1950 and opened to traffic on February 2, 1950, replacing the former Chelsea Bridge. The 36-foot-wide (11 m) roadway has three lanes of traffic on each of the two levels with northbound traffic on the lower level and southbound traffic on the upper level.

== Description ==
The bridge is a three-span cantilevered truss bridge at 1,525 ft (465 m) in total length. The center span is longest at 800 ft (240 m) and the maximum truss height is 115 ft (35 m). There are 36 approach spans to the north and 32 to the south. The roadway is seven lanes wide between the shortest (439 ft; 134 m) span and the center – the former location of the toll plaza.

== History ==
=== Chelsea Bridge ===
Early transport between Boston and Winnisimmet (later Chelsea) was by the Winnisimmet Ferry. In 1803, the Salem Turnpike was extended across the Mystic River to Charlestown, where the Charles River Bridge then connected to downtown Boston. The new Mystic River bridge (Chelsea Bridge) had two draw spans and cost $53,000 (equivalent to $1,380,000 in 2025) to construct. The Boston and Chelsea Railroad opened a single horsecar track over the bridge on November 20, 1858. The toll was dropped on November 9, 1869, when the bridge and turnpike became state property. The Boston portion of the bridge was rebuilt in 1877, with a new iron draw span, while the Chelsea portion was also repaired. The Lynn and Boston Railroad (successor to the Boston and Chelsea Railroad) ran a pair of horsecar tracks across the bridge.

In 1880, Chelsea paid Boston $25,000 (equivalent to $715,000 in 2025) to permanently maintain the portion of the bridge within Chelsea, including the north draw. The Boston portion was damaged by a fire on September 7, 1887. Electric streetcars replaced the horsecars on the bridge in the early 1890s, with all-electric service effective March 13, 1893.

==== Charlestown viaduct ====
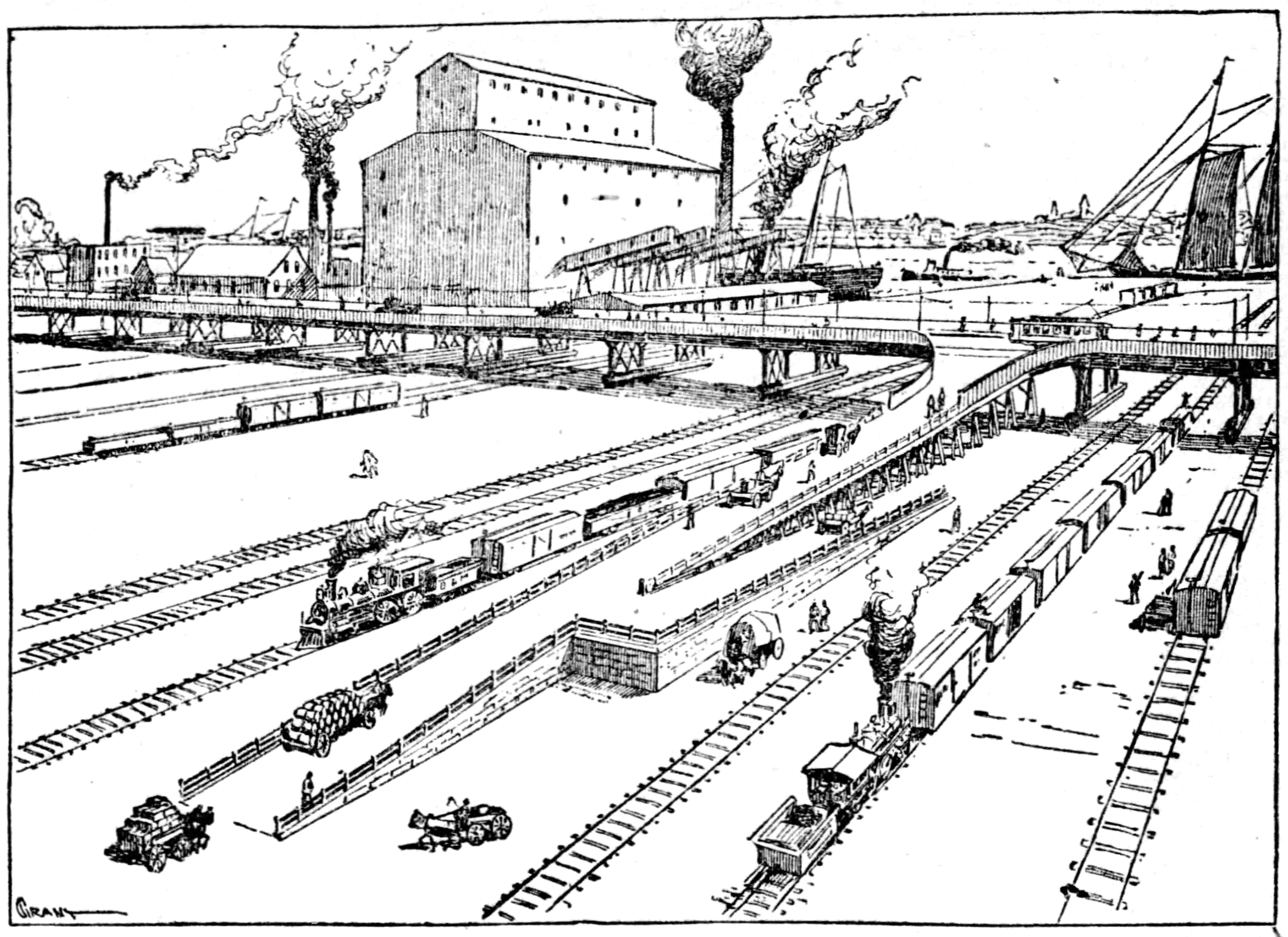
An 1894 drawing of the viaduct

The Boston and Lowell Railroad (B&L) purchased the Mystic River Railroad, an unbuilt paper railroad, in 1871. It constructed the line from Milk Row station around Charlestown to a new freight terminal built on filled land in the Mystic River between the two channels. After a legal battle with the Lynn and Boston Railroad about the right to cross its tracks, the B&L extended the branch across the Mystic Bridge, allowing ships to dock without passing through any bridges. As the B&L and its successor Boston and Maine Railroad (B&M) expanded Mystic Wharf in the 1880s, replacing the middle section of the bridge with a roadway on filled land, the grade crossings became a significant inconvenience and hazard to bridge traffic.

The railroad's construction of transatlantic port facilities, including a grain elevator and coal depot, along with additional crossings of the bridge road brought the issue to a head in 1892. That June, the state legislature passed an act authorizing Chelsea to pursue elimination of the grade crossings. The B&M was to pay 65% of the cost, the Lynn and Boston Railroad 5%, and the state 30% (of which part would be in turn paid by Boston and Chelsea). Negotiations between the B&M, the Lynn and Boston, and the cities of Boston and Chelsea took place in 1893 over plans to raise the street onto a viaduct over the rail yard. The B&M was willing to build a viaduct with a wooden roadway 40 feet (12 m) wide, but the other parties insisted on a 50 feet (15 m)-wide roadway with a granite deck.

A temporary south span and roadway opened on May 1, 1894, allowing construction of the viaduct to begin. This was closed to all but streetcar traffic on May 1, 1895. Streetcars began using the new viaduct on August 4, 1895, and it opened to general traffic on December 29. The viaduct was 2,777 feet (846 m) long and raised about 20 feet (6.1 m) above the old grade, with a 45-foot-wide (14 m) roadway and 8-foot-wide (2.4 m) sidewalk. Masonry piers spaced 70 feet (21 m) apart supported the iron viaduct, which cost $600,000 (equivalent to $15,000,000 in 2025) to construct. A perpendicular ramp led from the viaduct to the rail yard below. As part of the project, the north draw span was replaced by a retractile drawbridge and widened by 8–10 feet (2.4–3.0 m) to just under 45 feet (14 m).

==== Draw span replacements ====
As the New England Gas and Coke Company prepared to open its new plant upstream, a further widening of the north draw became necessary to accommodate Dominion Steel and Coal Corporation ships serving the plant. Henry Melville Whitney offered to pay $40,000 on behalf of the company to secure a width of 75 feet (23 m); however, the city instead chose a 60-foot (18 m) width. Preliminary work began in late 1899. A temporary bridge was funded by the gas company ($14,000) and the Lynn and Boston ($7,000). A contract for $21,471 for the construction of the new draw span was issued on February 26, 1900. The new span opened on September 25, 1900, with a total cost around $75,000 (equivalent to $2,383,000 in 2025)

Another replacement of the north draw span began in early 1912, with the temporary bridge completed that August. The new steel truss swing span – claimed to be the largest bridge span in New England – opened on May 28, 1913. The 1,400-short-ton (1,300 t) span rotated on 64 wheels on a 44-foot (13 m) diameter circular rail. It was 363 feet (111 m) long and 60 feet (18 m) wide, and could rotate to provide two 125-foot (38 m)-wide channels large enough for oceangoing ships. As part of the $425,000 project (equivalent to $10,200,000 in 2025), the wooden pile approaches were raised to eliminate a slope from the Charlestown viaduct.

The city planned to replace the south draw span shortly afterwards at a nearly equal cost. On March 14, 1914, the 230-short-ton (210 t) temporary span from the north draw was moved in one piece – using the tide to lift the span on lighters – to serve as the new temporary south draw. The temporary span, with sharp reverse curves at both ends, remained in use longer than planned. A $521,830 contract for the permanent span (equivalent to $7,900,000 in 2025) was issued on April 26, 1922, and construction began on May 2. The new bridge opened on April 21, 1924. It was 365 feet (111 m) long, with a four-leaf bascule draw 119 feet (36 m) long and 61 feet (19 m) wide, widening the channel to 75 feet (23 m).

By early 1934, the north section of Chelsea Bridge was in need of repairs. On June 27, 1934, traffic on the north draw was restricted to vehicles under 6 short tons (5,400 kg) except for streetcars, using only one lane in each direction. The century-old drawtenders' house nearly collapsed into the river on July 23, 1934, as piles supporting it sank into the riverbed. A $292,222 contract (equivalent to $5,500,000 in 2025) for repairs to the north span was issued on October 26, 1934. The bridge closed to all traffic effective January 14, 1935. Initial plans had called for streetcar service by the Eastern Massachusetts Street Railway (successor to the Lynn and Boston) to be maintained during construction. However, the Eastern Mass instead operated buses between Chelsea Square and Haymarket Square via the Meridian Street Bridge and the newly opened Sumner Tunnel under a permit issued just two days prior. The bridge reopened on December 23, 1935, without streetcar tracks; the Eastern Mass continued its bus operations. The Boston Elevated Railway began Chelsea Square–City Square bus service over the bridge on July 2, 1936.

=== Construction and financing ===
The new bridge was originally operated by the Mystic River Bridge Authority. The bridge, according to the statute enacted May 23, 1946, would be turned over to the Massachusetts Department of Public Works once the $27 million in bonds used to finance the bridge's construction was retired. The bridge would then become part of the state highway system to be maintained and operated by the department free of tolls.

Construction of the bridge displaced about 250 families from the primarily Jewish neighborhood of Chelsea. The bridge effectively split the community into two smaller sections, accelerating the decline of the overall Jewish community of Chelsea and its migration to Brookline and Newton.

Operation of the bridge was turned over to the new Massachusetts Port Authority in 1956.

The Chelsea Bridge originally remained intact; the southern section remained open as truck access to Mystic Wharf, while the northern section was closed to traffic but still carried a water main across the Mystic River. State funding for a replacement water tunnel was approved in August 1950. On January 28, 1951, six people in a wedding party died when they drove onto the Charlestown end of the closed bridge and fell into the river at the open north draw. The north draw and the north section of the viaduct were removed in 1954. A new street, Terminal Street, opened on August 21, 1956, to serve the Mystic Wharf; the old south draw was closed at that time and soon removed. A new fixed bridge was built near the alignment of the former south draw in 1982 as part of a project to remove trucks from neighborhood streets in Charlestown. It provides only 12 feet (3.7 m) clearance above the water, as the only vessels using the Little Mystic Channel were recreational boats using a 1970s-built boat ramp.

=== Later events ===
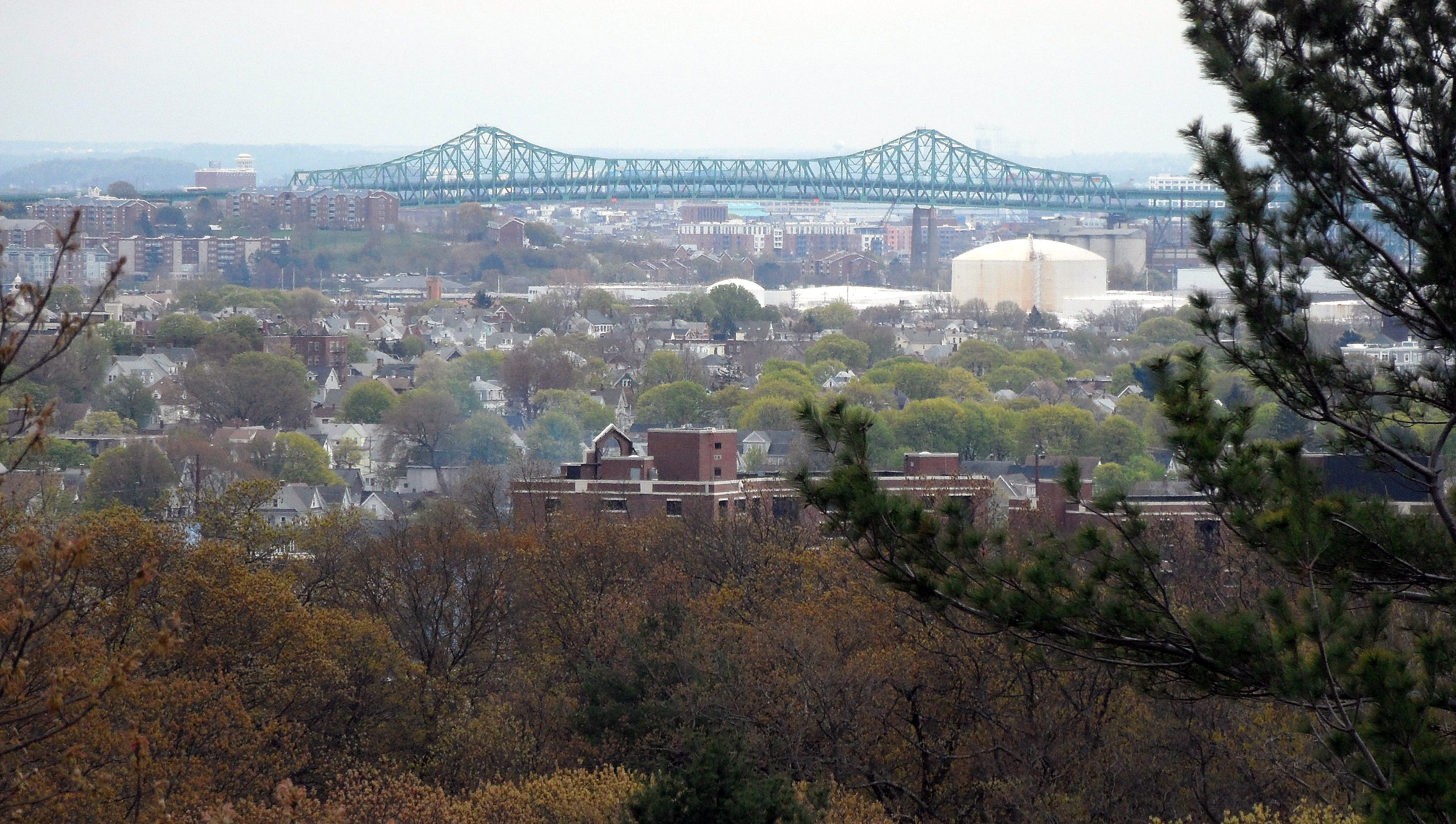
Tobin Bridge from Boojum Rock, Malden, Massachusetts, 2019

In 1967, the Mystic River Bridge was renamed in honor of Maurice J. Tobin, former Boston mayor and Massachusetts governor. Construction of the bridge began during his term as governor (1945–1947). On May 2, 1983, one-way tolling was implemented on the Tobin Bridge and in the Sumner and Callahan tunnels in an attempt to reduce traffic jams. The northbound toll plaza was removed, while the southbound toll doubled to 50 cents.

The bridge was transferred from Massport to the new Massachusetts Department of Transportation effective January 1, 2010. The southbound toll plaza closed on July 21, 2014, and was later removed, in favor of all-electronic open road tolling. Both E-ZPass and "pay-by-mail" (using license plate number recognition) were accepted. This began a 2 1/2 year process by MassDOT which converted all of the toll roads and bridges throughout the Commonwealth to automatic open road tolling. In 2016, the $2.50 southbound toll was replaced with $1.25 tolls in both directions, with a 30-cent surcharge for pay-by-mail.

In September 2017, the Massachusetts Department of Transportation announced a three-year $41.6 million project to restore the bridge deck, repair steel, and paint a portion of the bridge. The work ran April through November in 2018, 2019, and 2020.

== Incidents ==
In 1973, a gravel truck traveling over the lower deck crashed into a support, collapsing the upper deck onto the truck and killing the driver. Later that year, the bridge reopened after more than two months of repair. On January 4, 1990, racial hoaxer and double murderer Charles Stuart committed suicide by jumping from the bridge. Suicides and attempted suicides have been an issue for authorities in general as the design and weight of the bridge makes it impossible to add suicide prevention devices. MassDOT employees are thus trained to monitor security cameras and watch for any vehicles that stop on the bridge.
