= Sumner Tunnel =

Tunnel in Boston

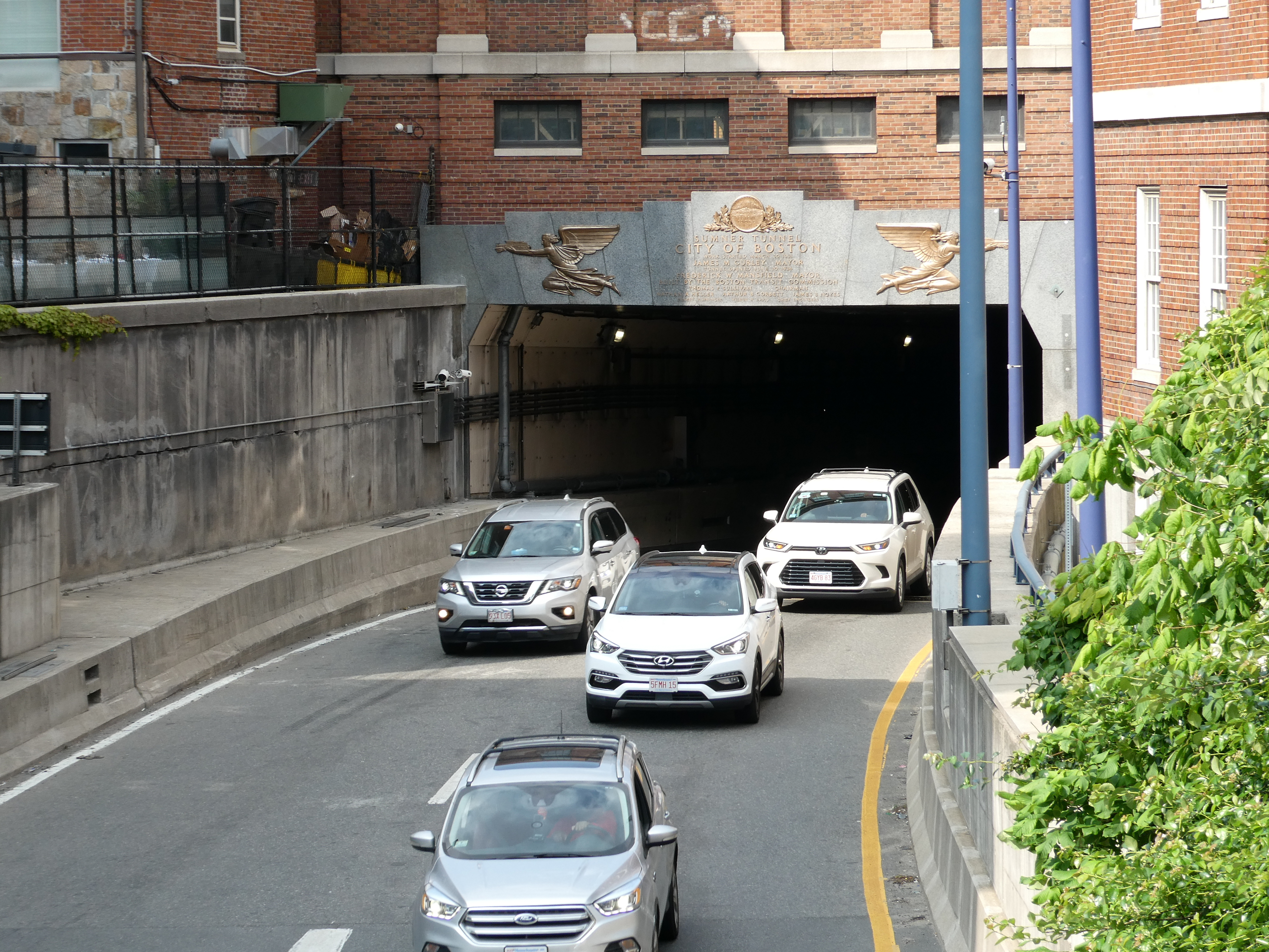
- Exit from the tunnel in Downtown Boston
- Interactive map of Sumner Tunnel

Overview
- Location: Boston, Massachusetts
- Coordinates: 42°22′05″N 71°2′47″W
- Status: Open
- Route: Route 1A south
- Start: East Boston
- End: Downtown Boston

Operation
- Constructed: March 30, 1931 – June 30, 1934
- Opened: June 30, 1934; 92 years ago
- Owner: Commonwealth of Massachusetts
- Operator: Massachusetts Department of Transportation
- Traffic: Automotive
- Toll: Between $0.20 and $2.05 depending on payment method and residency

Technical
- Length: 1.079 mi (1.736 km)
- No. of lanes: 2
- Operating speed: 40 mph (64 km/h)
- Tunnel clearance: 12.6 ft (3.8 m)
- Width: 22.2 ft (6.8 m)

The Sumner Tunnel is a road tunnel in Boston, Massachusetts, United States. It carries traffic under Boston Harbor in one direction, from Logan International Airport and Route 1A in East Boston. The tunnel originally deposited traffic at the west side of the North End, but with the completion of the Big Dig, it was modified to have two exits. One exit connects to I-93 northbound and downtown Boston (Government Center) near Haymarket Station. The other exit connects to Storrow Drive and Nashua St., connecting Cambridge via Route 28. Traffic headed for I-93 southbound and the Massachusetts Turnpike (I-90) westbound is normally routed to the Ted Williams Tunnel. It is managed by the Massachusetts Department of Transportation.

== History ==
The Sumner Tunnel was opened on June 30, 1934. It carried traffic in both directions until the opening of the parallel Callahan Tunnel in 1961. The Sumner Tunnel is named for William H. Sumner, the son of Governor Increase Sumner.

Until 2009, it was managed by the Massachusetts Turnpike Authority, when it was transferred to the Massachusetts Department of Transportation.

As of 2016, a toll of $1.50 is charged for non-commercial two-axle vehicles with a Massachusetts E-ZPass, while non-Massachusetts E-ZPass holders are charged $1.75. Vehicles without E-ZPass are charged $2.05 through MassDOT's Pay by Plate MA program. For residents of certain Boston ZIP Codes, a discount is in effect using an E-ZPass transponder, costing $0.20. On November 14, 2008, the Massachusetts Turnpike Authority voted in favor of a proposed toll hike which would double the toll to $7.00 for non-commercial vehicles (at the time, the toll was $3.50 in the southbound direction only). E-ZPass users would receive a $1.00 discount and commercial vehicles would end up having to pay $9.00. This vote was later rescinded following a vote approving a 1.25% sales tax increase.

In 2016, cashless tolling systems were installed in both directions, entering the Sumner Tunnel and exiting the Callahan Tunnel as part of a plan to modernize toll collection in the Boston area.

The tunnel was shut intermittently for modernization from summer 2022 through summer 2024. It was fully closed from July 5 and August 5, 2024, and on weekends from August 9 through November 15, except for August 30 and October 11.

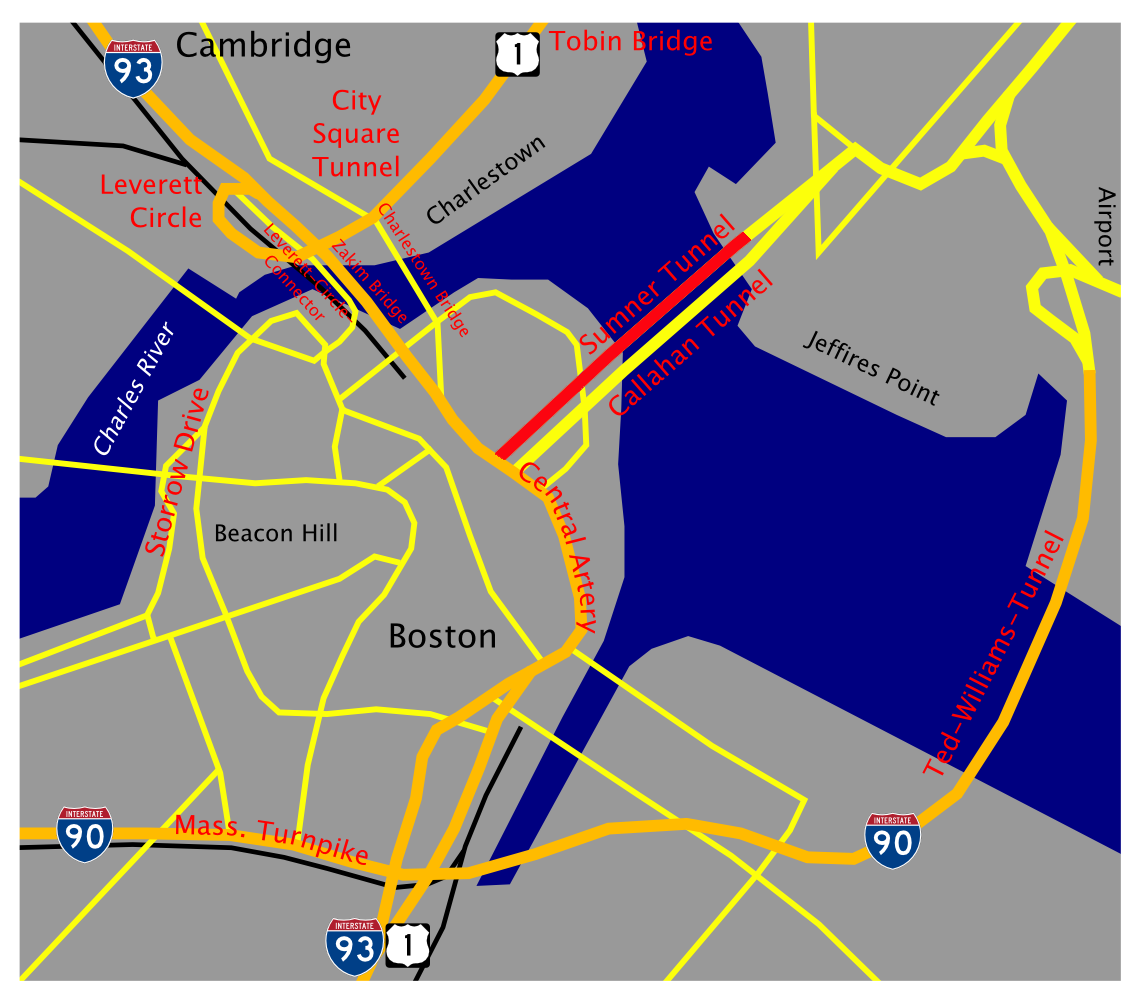
Showing the Sumner Tunnel (in red)

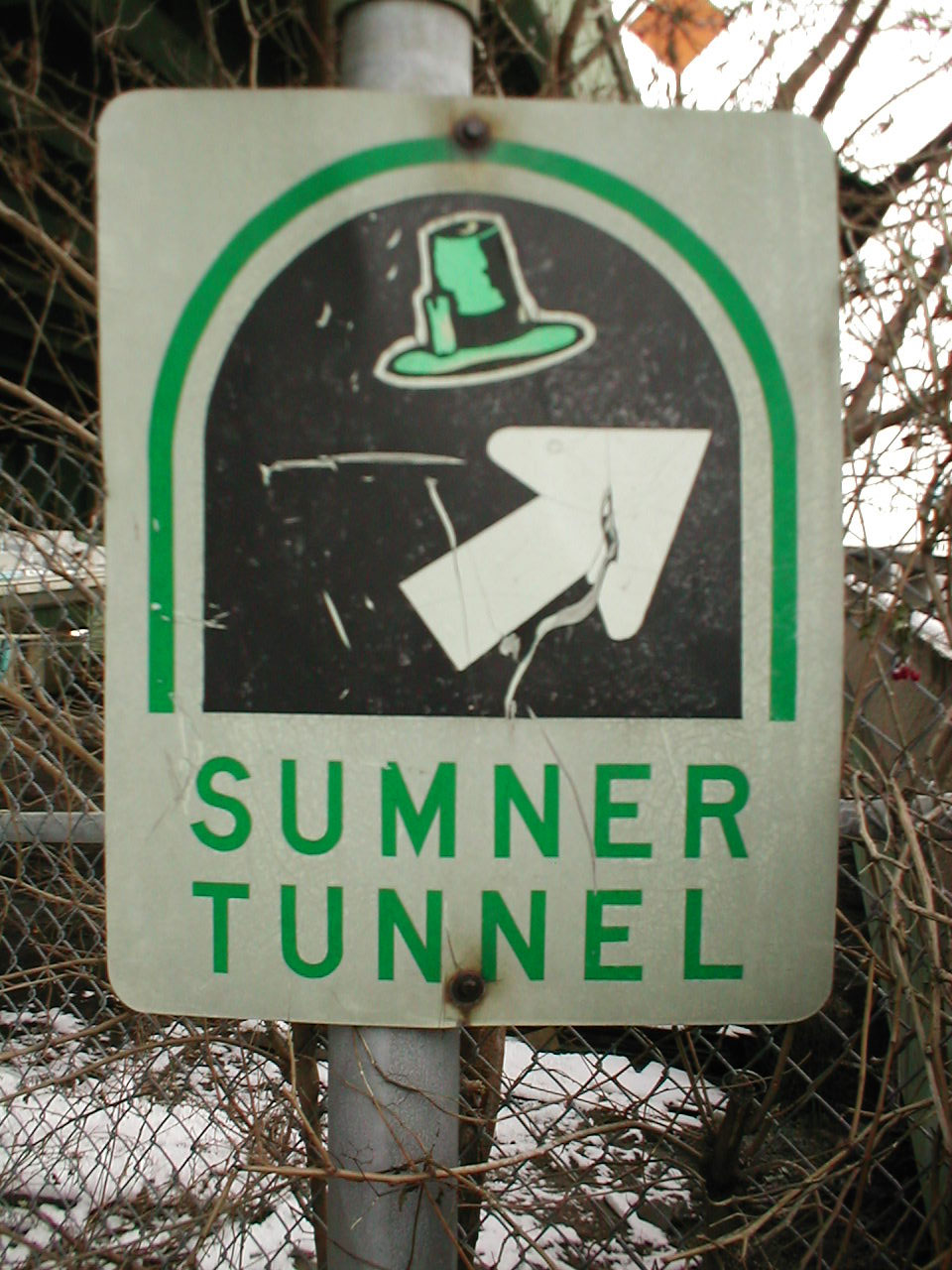
An old shield for the Sumner Tunnel, with the Masspike hat. This shield is no longer used.

== See also ==
- Big Dig (Boston, Massachusetts)
- Callahan Tunnel
- Massachusetts Turnpike
- Ted Williams Tunnel
- Thomas P. O'Neill Jr. Tunnel
- Zakim Bunker Hill Bridge
