= List of electronic toll collection systems =

This is a list of electronic toll collection systems in use on toll roads throughout the world.

== Africa ==
=== South Africa ===
Open Road (ORT) E-tolling on the Gauteng Freeway system started on 3 December 2013. The cost for the ETC system to toll 187 km of roads was R20bn. Electronic Toll Collection (Pty) Ltd (ETC), a subsidiary of Kapsch TrafficCom AG, is the contracted company that designed, built and is still operating the system, and in turn oversees the Transaction Clearing House (TCH) which oversees customer accounts, and the Violation Processing Centre (VPC) which will follow procedures against payment defaulters. Vehicles are identified electronically without any cash transactions taking place on the road or highway. Vehicle identification is facilitated by an e-tag or a vehicle license plate number which is recorded by overhead cameras installed on gantries, and interpreted by computer.

The system was widely denounced, and poor compliance affected SANRAL's credit rating. A public coalition known as 'Opposition to Urban Tolling Alliance', later renamed Organisation Undoing Tax Abuse (OUTA), launched initiatives to frustrate e-tolling's implementation, and a trade union, law firm and church were among the dissenting voices. OUTA believed the system to be unlawful and approached the high court in 2012, which ruled that the GFIP was lawfully instituted, but denied SANRAL a punitive costs order. In 2014 OUTA launched the Rule of Law campaign and promised to challenge the legality of procedures against payment defaulters.

In the first six months the overdue toll fees of unregistered road users accrued to R1 billion, and the Gauteng government acknowledged the dissatisfaction of motorists. Sanral CEO Skhumbuzo Macozoma confirmed in Sep 2020 that Gauteng's e-toll compliance rate before the COVID-19 pandemic was at 20%, collecting only R60-million a month.

- e-toll operated by Sanral throughout the Gauteng province. Cities include Johannesburg, Pretoria, Centurion, Midrand, Soweto and the East and West Rand.
- Bakwena N1N4 Toll Concession The Bakwena N1N4 Toll is a separate system and has been operating for the past 12 years. The e-tag system employed by Sanral is also compatible with the current Bakwena tags and may be registered with Sanral's e-toll system for use on certain sections of the N1 and N4 towards Bela-Bela, Rustenburg and Botswana.
- Since December 2015, the e-tag is operational on all toll roads nationally.

=== Kenya ===
The Nairobi Expressway is a 27 kilometres (17 mi) toll road in Kenya. ETC started operation in 2022 with users needing to top-up their ETC accounts prior to using the service. ETC users on the Nairobi Expressway enjoy a 5% discount off all trips.

== Asia ==
=== East Asia ===
==== China ====
ETC has operated in China since June 2014. In December 2014, 13 provinces supported ETC. By December 2015, it was accepted in 29 provinces. Plans vary by province and bank, and discounted rates (usually 5% off) may be available in some areas. The MoT scheduled to cancel all cross-provinces and cross-junctions toll booths in 2019, by renovating toll booths in all entries and exits, plus installing barrels (like how Electronic Road Pricing in Singapore works) on the province borders to fully support non-stop payments, and hence all such toll booths were closed by January 2020.

Type of payment: prepaid card, some Chinese debit card (depends on at which bank one's ETC account was opened), some Chinese credit cards (depends on at which bank one's ETC account was opened), and (in some provinces) Alipay and WeChat pay. There is usually an up front payment for new users. Wherever a Chinese ETC account is opened, it is accepted nationwide as long as ETC is supported in that area.

Some emergency services vehicles, such as fire trucks and military vehicles also have ETC e-tags installed by MEM and MND.

Toll system	Type of roadway	Owned by	Operated by	Location
Huitong Card	Expressways Toll roads Parking places Custom checkpoints	Anhui Government	Anhui Province Expressway Network Operation Co Ltd	Anhui
Sutong Card	Expressways Toll roads Parking places Custom checkpoints	Beijing Government	Beijing Sutong Technology Co Ltd	Beijing
Sutong Card	Expressways Toll roads Parking places Custom checkpoints	Tianjin Government	Beijing Sutong Technology Co Ltd	Tianjin
Tongyu Card	Expressways Toll roads Parking places Custom checkpoints	Chongqing Government	Chongqing Expressways Corp.	Chongqing
Mintong Card	Expressways Toll roads Parking places Custom checkpoints	Fujian Government	Fujian Expressway ETC toll center	Fujian
E-Serve	Expressways Toll roads Parking places Custom checkpoints	Guangdong Government	Guangdong Unitoll Co Ltd	GD-HK-MO
Baguixing Card	Expressways Toll roads Parking places Custom checkpoints	Guangxi Government	Guangxi Jietong Expressway Technology Co Ltd	Guangxi
Low Carbon Driving Card	Expressways Toll roads Parking places Custom checkpoints	Hebei Government	Hebei Expressway Bureau	Hebei
Zhongyuantong	Expressways Toll roads Parking places Custom checkpoints	Henan Government	Henan Shibo Electronic Co Ltd	Henan
Heilongjiang ETC Card	Expressways Toll roads Parking places Custom checkpoints	Heilongjiang Government	Heilongjiang ETC Bureau	Heilongjiang
Hubei ETC VIP	Expressways Toll roads Parking places Custom checkpoints	Hubei Government	Hubei Expressway Network Toll collecting Center	Hubei
Xiangtong Card	Expressways Toll roads Parking places Custom checkpoints	Hunan Government	Hunan Expressway Jietong Informations Co Ltd	Hunan
Mengtong Card	Expressways Toll roads Parking places Custom checkpoints	Inner Mongolia Government		Inner Mongolia
Sutong Card	Expressways Toll roads Parking places Custom checkpoints	Jiangsu Government	Jiangsu Expressway Network Operation Co Ltd	Jiangsu
Gantong Card	Expressways Toll roads Parking places Custom checkpoints	Jiangxi Government	Jiangxi Expressway Networking Management Center	Jiangxi
	Expressways Toll roads Parking places Custom checkpoints	Jilin Government		Jilin
	Expressways Toll roads Parking places Custom checkpoints	Liaoning Government	Liaoning Province Expressway Industrial Development Co Ltd	Liaoning
Sanqintong	Expressways Toll roads Parking places Custom checkpoints	Shaanxi Government	Shaanxi Province Expressway E-pay Co Ltd	Shaanxi
Lutong Card	Expressways Toll roads Parking places Custom checkpoints	Shandong Government	Shandong Expressway Collecting Center	Shandong
Xinlian Card	Expressways Toll roads Parking places Custom checkpoints	Shandong Government	Shandong Expressway Xinlian Co Ltd	Shandong
Hutong Card	Expressways Toll roads Parking places Custom checkpoints	Shanghai Government	SPTCC	Shanghai
Kuaitong Card	Expressways Toll roads Parking places Custom checkpoints	Shanxi Government	Shanxi Transportation Informations Co Ltd	Shanxi
Zhejiang ETC Card	Expressways Toll roads Parking places Custom checkpoints	Zhejiang Government	Zhejiang Highway Bureau	Zhejiang

There are no known payment systems and toll booths for expressways in Hainan and Tibet, because:

1. Management fees of Hainan expressways are combined with fuel surcharges, and hence instead of drivers paying tolls, such fees are dynamically paid by filling stations in Hainan;
2. Expressways in Tibet are built by Tibetan PAPs, and are directly managed by State Council.

==== Hong Kong ====
Covers toll roads and tunnels in Hong Kong; 220,000 users making 320,000 daily transactions.

Toll system	Number of roadways	Owned by	Operated by
HKeToll	12 toll roads and tunnels	Government of Hong Kong	Autotoll (formerly Autopass or Electronic Toll Systems Ltd., both merged with Autotoll)
Autotoll	12 toll roads and tunnels	Government of Hong Kong	Autotoll (formerly Autopass or Electronic Toll Systems Ltd., both merged with Autotoll)

==== Japan ====
ETC started operation in 2001. It covers toll roads and tunnels in Japan; there are 6,000,000 daily transactions with a usage ratio of 90%.

==== South Korea ====
hi-pass, operated by Korea Expressway Corporation, covers all national express roads and several BTO/BTL roads in South Korea. From 2013, transportation cards the (T-money, Cashbee, and Hanpay) are compatible with existing hi-pass system.

==== Taiwan ====
Taiwan's ETC systems have been operating since February 10, 2006. It transitioned from OBU (infrared-based) to e-Tag (passive RFID-based) MLFF as of 2012, and started live operations in December 2013.

Name of roadway	Type of roadway	Owned by	Operated by
Sun Yat-sen Freeway, Formosa Freeway (21 toll stations)	Highway	Taiwan Area Freeway Bureau	Far Eastern Electronic Toll Collection Co. (FETC)

=== West Asia ===
Name of roadway	Type of roadway	Owned by	Operated by	Location
Highway 6	Highway		Derech Eretz	Israel
Sheikh Zayed Road	Highway	Government of Dubai (However, not all of Sheikh Zayed Road)	RTA	Dubai, UAE
Al Garhoud Bridge	Highway	Government of Dubai (However, not all of Sheikh Zayed Road)	RTA	Dubai, UAE
Al Maktoum Bridge	Arterial Roads	Government of Dubai (However, not all of Sheikh Zayed Road)	RTA	Dubai, UAE
Beirut Street	Arterial Roads	Government of Dubai (However, not all of Sheikh Zayed Road)	RTA	Dubai, UAE
Ahvaz-Bandar Emam Freeway	Freeway	ETC	Bank Maskan	Iran
Tehran-Pardis Freeway	Freeway	ETC	Bank Maskan	Iran
Tehran-Qom Freeway	Freeway	ETC	Bank Maskan	Iran

=== South Asia ===
==== India ====
FASTag is the electronic toll collection system in India, operated by the National Highway Authority of India (NHAI). It employs RFID for making toll payments directly from the prepaid balance or savings account linked to it. A transponder is affixed on the windscreen of the vehicle and it enables the user to drive through toll plazas without stopping for transactions. FASTag has unlimited validity. Dedicated lanes at some toll plazas have been built for FASTag. As of September 2019, FASTag lanes are available on over 500 national and state highways and over 35.23 million cars are enabled with FASTag. From 15 February 2021, FASTag was made mandatory for all vehicles and toll plazas in the country.

==== Pakistan ====
M-Tag is the electronic toll collection system deployed on every Motorways and Expressways of Pakistan by One Network. It includes a system of automated and centrally connected electronic toll collection system utilizing the latest technology. https://onenetwork.pk/

==== Sri Lanka ====
Name of roadway	Type of roadway	Owned by	Branded as	Operated by	Location
Colombo – Katunayake Expressway	Expressway	Road Development Authority	E-Tag	Expressway Operation Maintenance and Management Division-Sri Lanka	Sri Lanka

=== Southeast Asia ===
==== Indonesia ====
In the early 2010s Bank Mandiri introduced the e-toll (now Mandiri e-money) contactless charge card, which monopolized the Electronic Toll Collection system in Indonesia's expressways for a time.

Since October 31, 2017 all expressways in Indonesia no longer accept cash tolls.

Toll booths only accept contactless charge cards as part of a greater "National Non-Cash Movement" (Gerakan Nasional Non Tunai, GNNT) organized by the central bank. As of the time of the switchover, charge cards issued by the three state-owned banks Bank Mandiri, BNI, and BRI, as well as those issued by BCA, or co-branded with those four banks, were accepted. Jakcard from Bank DKI and BSB Cash from Bank Sumsel Babel are also accepted in local toll roads.

This is also a part of the Government of Indonesia's plan to eradicate toll booths and replace them with open-road tolling (officially called Multi-Lane Free Flow, MLFF by the government) similar to the ETC system in Taiwan.

==== Malaysia ====
Name of roadway	Type of roadway	Owned by	Branded as	Operated by	Location
Malaysian expressway networks	Highways/Expressway	Lembaga Lebuhraya Malaysia (Malaysia Highway Authority)	Smart TAG; Touch 'n Go; Touch 'n Go eWallet RFiD	Touch 'n Go Sdn Bhd	Nationwide

==== Philippines ====
There are two brands of RFID electronic toll collection systems in the country: Easytrip for expressways operated by Metro Pacific Investments and Autosweep for those operated by San Miguel Corporation. Both types were aimed to become interoperable sometime in 2020, as the Department of Transportation will start requiring users to register to either ETC system by January 2021 due to the COVID-19 pandemic. Currently, there are no plans for the country to use open road tolling.

Name of roadway	Type of roadway	Owned by	Operated by	Location
Metro Manila Skyway	Elevated Highway	Citra Metro Manila Tollways Corporation	AutoSweep RFID (Vendeka Toll Collection System)	Metro Manila
NAIA Expressway	Elevated Highway	Vertex Tollways Development, Inc	AutoSweep RFID (Vendeka Toll Collection System)	Metro Manila
North Luzon Expressway	Highway	NLEX Corporation	Easytrip	Luzon and Metro Manila
Muntinlupa–Cavite Expressway	Highway	AC Infrastructure Holdings Corporation	AutoSweep RFID	Luzon and Metro Manila
Manila–Cavite Expressway	Highway	Public Estates Authority Tollway Corporation	Easytrip	Luzon and Metro Manila
South Luzon Expressway	Highway	South Luzon Tollways Corporation	AutoSweep RFID (Vendeka Toll Collection System)	Luzon and Metro Manila
Subic–Clark–Tarlac Expressway	Highway	Bases Conversion and Development Authority (formerly) NLEX Corporation	Easytrip	Luzon
Subic Freeport Expressway	Highway	NLEX Corporation	Easytrip	Luzon
Southern Tagalog Arterial Road	Highway	STAR Infrastructure Development Corporation	AutoSweep RFID (Vendeka Toll Collection System)	Luzon
Tarlac–Pangasinan–La Union Expressway	Highway	Private Infra Development Corporation	AutoSweep RFID	Luzon

==== Singapore ====
Name of roadway	Type of roadway	Owned by	Operated by	Location
Roadways entering downtown	Roads and highways		Area Licensing Scheme (merged with EPS). This was the world's first to implement congestion charges to enter a downtown area.	Central core of Singapore
Roadways entering downtown	Roads and highways		Electronic Road Pricing	Central core of Singapore

==== Thailand ====
Name of roadway	Type of roadway	Owned by	Branded as	Operated by	Location
Thai expressway network	Expressways	Expressway Authority of Thailand	Easy Pass; M-Flow (experiment)	TAG	Bangkok and nearby provinces
Thai motorway network	Motorways	Department of Highways	Easy Pass; M-Flow (experiment)	TAG	Bangkok and nearby provinces

==== Vietnam ====
Toll system	Name of roadway	Type of roadway	Location
VETC (e-Tag), VDTC (ePass)	Expressways of Vietnam	Expressway	Nationwide
VETC (e-Tag), VDTC (ePass)	National highways	Highway	Nationwide

== Europe ==
=== British Isles ===
- Ireland – eToll national standard
- Ireland – Eazy Pass National Toll Roads implementation of eToll
- United Kingdom – Dart-Tag for the Dartford Crossing
- United Kingdom – London congestion charge in London
- United Kingdom – Fast tag Mersey tunnels: Queensway Tunnel and Kingsway Tunnel
- United Kingdom – M6 Toll tag in the Midlands
- United Kingdom – Severn TAG for the Severn Bridge crossing and Second Severn Crossing
- United Kingdom – Tamar Bridge
- United Kingdom – permit for the Tyne Tunnel linking North and South Tyneside
- United Kingdom — HumberTag, used on the Humber Bridge in North Lincolnshire and the East Riding of Yorkshire

=== Central Europe ===
- Austria – Videomaut for motorways and expressways subject to special tolls (Sondermautstrecke)
- Austria – go-maut for the national Autobahn network (where passenger cars would require a vignette)
- Czech Republic – premid for trucks on highways
- Germany – LKW-MAUT for trucks on Autobahns
- Hungary – HU-GO, on all highways in Hungary for any vehicle
- Poland – e-TOLL mandatory for trucks over 3.5 tons and buses, optional for passenger cars
- Slovak Republic – SkyToll a. s. for vehicles over 3.5 tons total weight
- Switzerland – LSVA ("performance-related heavy vehicle fee")

=== Eastern Europe ===
- Belarus – BelToll, on all tolled highways
- Russia – Flow+ (on Western Rapid Diameter, Saint Petersburg cross-city express motorway), Avtodor (on high-speed toll Moscow–Saint Petersburg motorway and toll shortcuts on M4 highway)

=== Northern Europe ===
- Denmark/Sweden – BroBizz (EasyGo) for the Øresund, Great Belt and Crown Princess Mary's bridges
- Latvia - LVvignette
- Lithuania - e-vignette for vehicles over 3.5 tons and goods vehicles under 3.5 t (EU category N1)
- Norway – AutoPASS (EasyGo) on some ferries and all toll roads except the Atlantic Ocean Tunnel
- Sweden – Stockholm congestion tax in Stockholm, Gothenburg congestion tax in Gothenburg and infrastructure charge on Motala and Sundsvall bridges

=== Southeast Europe ===
- Bosnia and Herzegovina – ACC, in federation of Bosnia and hercegovina, ENP in Relublick of Srpska
- Bulgaria – TollPass, on all highways and first class roads for vehicles above 3.5 tons
- Croatia – ENC, on all tolled motorways in Croatia (autocesta) except A2
- Romania – eTarif - Peaj, eRovinieta road tax mandatory for all automobiles
- Serbia – ENP, on all tolled highways in Serbia
- Slovenia – DarsGo (for vehicles over 3.5 tons)
- Turkey – OGS (active onboard transponder, abbreviation for "Otomatik Gecis Sistemi") and HGS provider by Turkish Post (passive RFID, abbreviation for "Hizli Gecis Sistemi")

=== Southern Europe ===
- Italy – Telepass, UnipolMove and MooneyGo on all Autostrade (motorway network). Telepass has been the first full-implemented ETC in Europe.
- Portugal – Via Verde
- Portugal – Highways A22 (Algarve) and A28 (Porto) operated by Via Livre
- Spain – VIA-T, VIA-T Pagatelia, VIA-T Bip&Drive

=== Western Europe ===
- Belgium – Kilometer charge for trucks on public roads
- France – Télépéage, usually branded liber-t on motorways (run by the Federation of French Motorway Companies) (ASFA)

== North America ==
=== Canada ===
- Maritime Provinces
  - MACPASS in the Halifax Regional Municipality, Nova Scotia
  - E-Pass at the Cobequid Pass, Cumberland County, Nova Scotia
  - Strait Pass at the Confederation Bridge
- Ontario
  - 407 ETR/Highway 407E in the Greater Toronto Area
  - E-ZPass at the Peace Bridge and the Lewiston–Queenston Bridge
- Quebec
  - Le lien intelligent at the Olivier-Charbonneau Bridge (autoroute 25) crossing the Rivière des Prairies in Montreal
  - A30 Express at the Pont Serge-Marcil (autoroute 30) crossing the Saint Lawrence River in the Montreal area

=== Costa Rica ===
- Quick Pass lanes employ technology similar to the technology that E-ZPass uses in the United States at toll booths nationwide.

=== Dominican Republic ===
- Paso Rapido lanes employ technology similar to the technology that E-ZPass uses in the United States at toll booths nationwide.

=== Mexico ===
- IAVE is used on all the highways operated by Caminos y Puentes Federales (CAPUFE).

=== Puerto Rico ===
- AutoExpreso, which is accepted at all Metropistas and Autopistas de Puerto Rico toll roads.

=== United States ===
The 2012 transportation funding bill MAP-21 required all electronic tolling systems on Interstate highways be compatible by October 1, 2016, but no funding and no penalty were provided, so discussions on interoperability are ongoing through the International Bridge, Tunnel and Turnpike Association. In Florida, older battery-powered SunPass transponders were no longer accepted as of January 1, 2016, in preparation for future compatibility with E-ZPass toll booths. Several mobile tolling platforms are currently in use.

- E-ZPass in Midwestern United States, Eastern United States, Florida and Minnesota
  - I-Pass in Illinois
  - NC Quick Pass in North Carolina
  - RiverLink system in Indiana and Kentucky for bridges over the Ohio River in the Louisville metro area. These presently include the formerly toll-free John F. Kennedy Bridge for southbound I-65, the Abraham Lincoln Bridge on northbound I-65, and the Lewis and Clark Bridge (including the East End Tunnel on the Kentucky approach) on IN 265/KY 841 (future extension of I-265 in both states). Motorists can obtain an E-ZPass transponder or a non-interoperable RiverLink one for use on RiverLink facilities only.
  - The E-ZPass system was branded as I-Zoom on the Indiana Toll Road from 2007 to 2012.
  - In Massachusetts, the E-ZPass system was branded as Fast Lane between 1998 and 2012. As of 2016, all toll facilities in Massachusetts use open-road tolling, and customers without transponders are charged a higher pay-by-plate rate.
  - On May 28, 2021, the Florida Turnpike Enterprise announced that its SunPass facilities would begin accepting E-ZPass. In addition, E-ZPass facilities began accepting SunPass Pro transponders (but not earlier SunPass transponders).
  - MnPass in Minnesota was rebranded into EZ-Pass on August 2, 2021.
  - Additionally, there are E-ZPass lanes in Ontario, Canada at the Peace Bridge (Canada-bound direction only) and the Lewiston-Queenston Bridge
- Downbeach Express Pass on the Downbeach Express in New Jersey
- E-PASS in Central Florida
  - North Carolina Quick Pass
  - Georgia PeachPass
  - Florida SunPass
  - Illinois I-Pass
  - E-ZPass
- Uni Toll Pass (previously known as E-PASS Xtra)
  - Interoperable with:
    - Florida E-PASS
    - Florida SunPass
    - Georgia PeachPass
    - North Carolina QuickPass
    - Illinois I-Pass
    - Louisville RiverLink
    - E-ZPass
- Express Pass in Utah
  - I-15 HOT lanes in the Salt Lake City area
- EXpressToll network in Colorado
  - GO-PASS on Northwest Parkway
- FasTrak in California
- Freedom Pass in Alabama at the following locations:
  - Tuscaloosa Bypass
  - Montgomery Expressway
  - Emerald Mountain Expressway
  - Beach Express
- GeauxPass in Louisiana
- Good to Go in Washington state
- In Michigan
  - MacPass at the Mackinac Bridge
  - Nexpress Toll at the Detroit-Windsor Tunnel
- NationalPass, a system for providing a single transponder claimed to be compatible with all of the other systems listed here.
- Palmetto Pass in South Carolina
- Southeast interoperability area
  - NC Quick Pass in North Carolina
  - Peach Pass in Georgia
  - SunPass in Florida
    - LeeWay in Lee County
    - O-PASS in Osceola County
    - C-Pass in Key Biscayne was replaced by SunPass and pay-by-plate on September 23, 2014.
    - SunPass PRO has been launched and is interoperable with E-ZPass system in the north east
- Central Plains interoperability area (North Texas Tollway Authority hub)
  - K-Tag in Kansas
  - Pikepass in Oklahoma
  - TxTAG in Texas
    - TollTag in Dallas
    - EZ TAG in Houston
  - EXpressToll network in Colorado

== Oceania ==
=== Australia ===
- Airport Link Tunnel in Brisbane, Queensland
- Clem Jones Tunnel (Clem7) in Brisbane
- Gateway Motorway in Brisbane
- Go Between Bridge in Brisbane
- Logan Motorway in Brisbane
- Legacy Way Tunnel in Brisbane
- CityLink, in Melbourne, Victoria
- Eastlink, in Melbourne
- West Gate Freeway, in Melbourne
- Sydney Harbour Bridge and Sydney Harbour Tunnel, in Sydney, New South Wales
- Eastern Distributor in Sydney
- M2 Hills Motorway, in Sydney
- M4 Western Motorway, in Sydney
- M5 South Western Motorway, in Sydney
- Westlink M7, in Sydney
- Cross City Tunnel, in Sydney
- Lane Cove Tunnel, in Sydney

=== New Zealand ===
- Northern Gateway Toll Road on the Northern Motorway in Auckland
- Tauranga Eastern Link Toll Road on State highway 2 in Tauranga
- Takitimu Drive Toll road on State highway 29 in Tauranga

== South America ==
=== Argentina ===
- Autopistas Avenida General Paz and Acceso Norte in Buenos Aires system PASE (Peaje Automático Sin Espera)
- Autopista 25 de Mayo
- Autopista Dellepiane
- Autopista Perito Moreno
- Autopista Arturo Illia
- Autopista Ezeiza – Cañuelas
- Autopista Acceso Oeste
- Autopista La Plata – Buenos Aires
- Autopista Camino Parque del Buen Ayre
- Córdoba – Caminos de las sierras (CUIS)

=== Brazil ===
- Veloe
- ConectCar
- Sem Parar
- Taggy

=== Chile ===
- Autopista Central in Santiago
- Autopista Vespucio Sur in Santiago
- Autopista Vespucio Norte Express in Santiago
- Costanera Norte in Santiago (world's first free-flow ETC freeway to cross through a downtown area)
- Túnel San Cristóbal in Santiago
- Acceso Sur de Santiago and Chile Highway 5 Santiago – Talca section
- Chile Route 68 in Santiago – Valparaíso and Santiago Viña del Mar
- International Highway Los Libertadores (Chilean section)
- Arturo Merino Benitez Road Access in Santiago

=== Colombia ===
- Vial Del Valle in Cali
