= Bottom Lounge =

Music venue in Chicago, Illinois, U.S.

Coordinates: 41°53′7″N 87°39′42″W

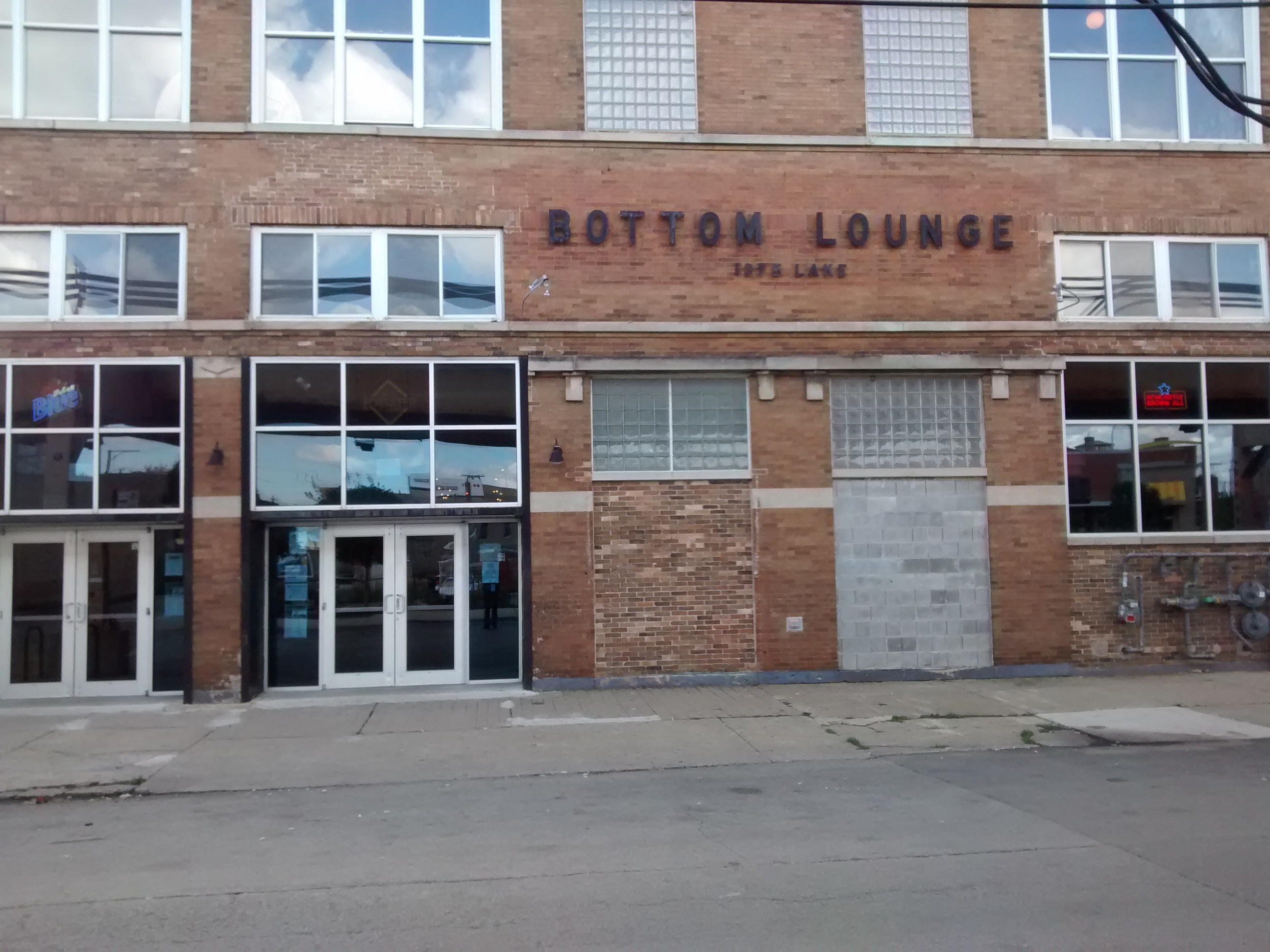
Bottom Lounge

Bottom Lounge is a concert hall at 1375 W. Lake St. in Chicago, Illinois. Originally located in Chicago's Lake View neighborhood at 3206 N. Wilton, Bottom Lounge was acquired by the CTA in eminent domain in 2001 and seized for demolition in 2005 to make way for the Brown Line Brown Line Capacity Expansion Project. Hindered by lawsuits regarding the relocation and payment for Bottom Lounge under Uniform Relocation Act, Bottom Lounge re-opened at its current West Loop location in 2008.

The main concert hall is a 700 capacity sized room. Bottom Lounge also houses the Volcano Room, a 300 capacity mixed use space and a full restaurant specializing in American Midwest fare.
