= Open road tolling =

Boothless toll collecting

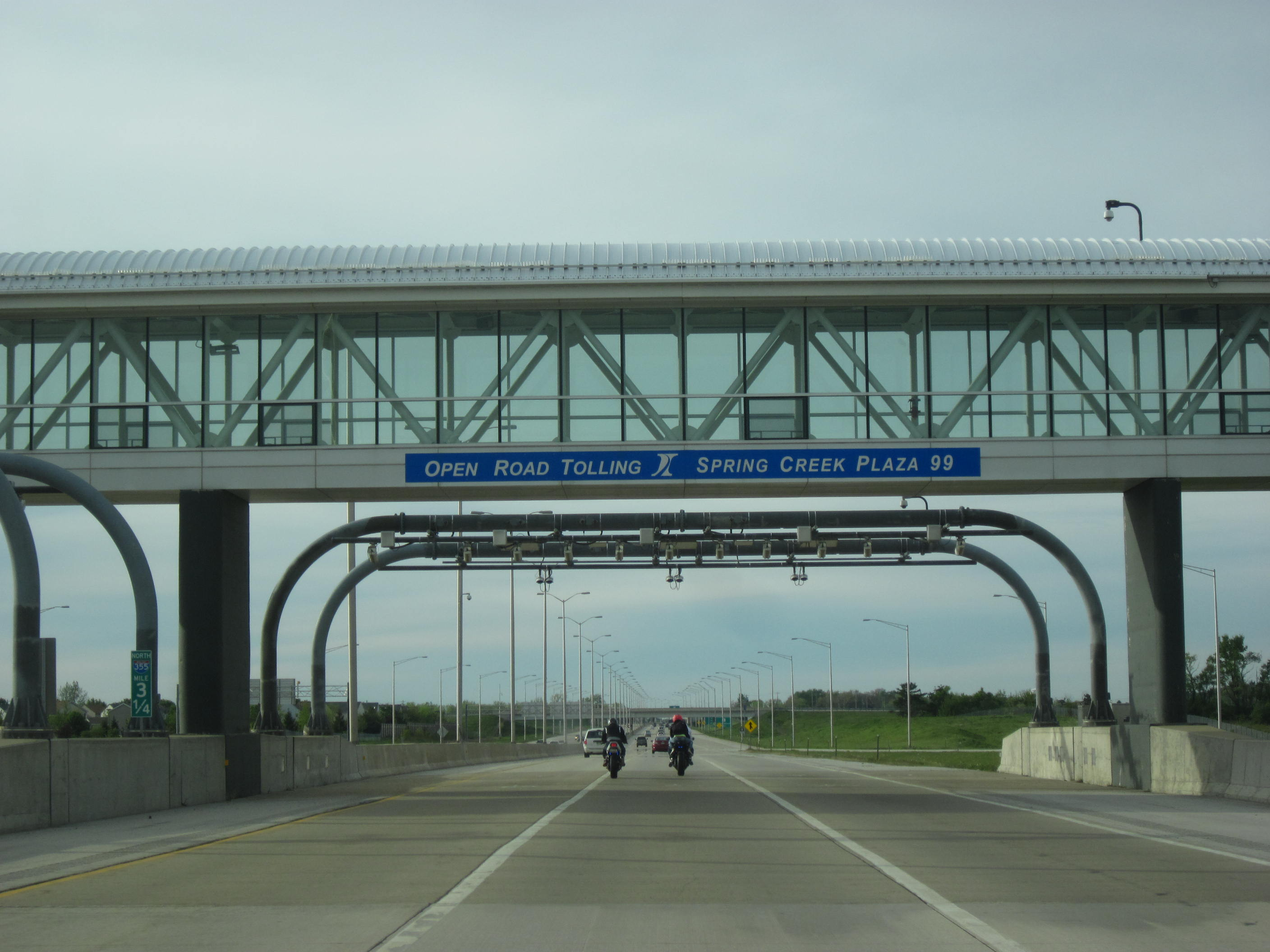
ORT lanes along Interstate 355 near the Chicago suburb of Lockport

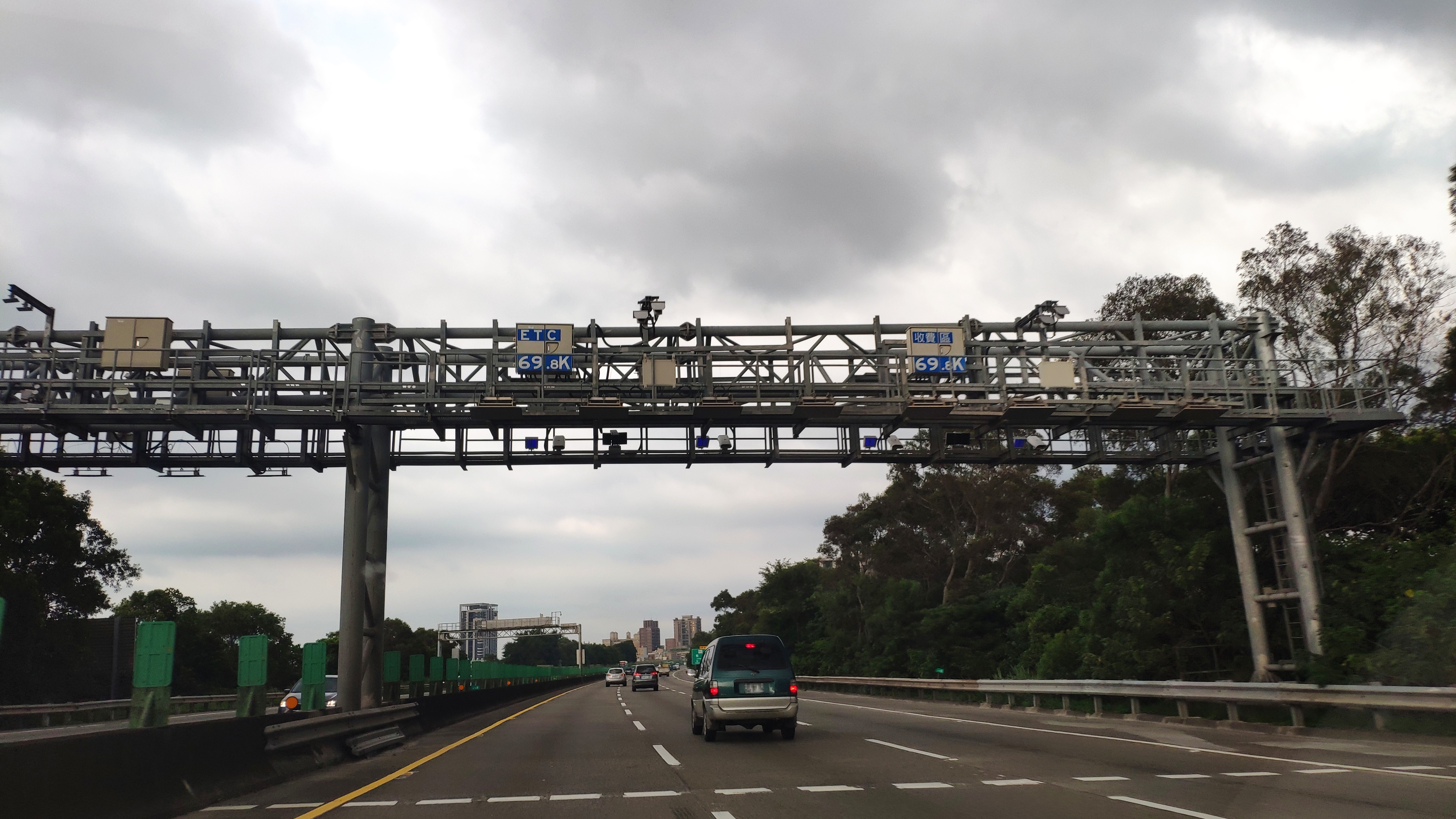
Electronic Toll Collection toll gate in Taiwan, which allows the motorist to pay their toll without stopping or slowing down

Open road tolling (ORT), also called all-electronic tolling, cashless tolling, or free-flow tolling, is the collection of tolls on toll roads without the use of tollbooths. An electronic toll collection system is usually used instead. The major advantage to ORT is that users are able to drive through the toll plaza at highway speeds without having to slow down to pay the toll. In some installations, ORT may also reduce congestion at the plazas by allowing more vehicles per hour/per lane.

The disadvantage to ORT is that it relies on the honor system to the extent that without the presence of toll booths there is typically no physical means of preventing drivers who have no intention of paying the toll from accessing the road. Toll operators refer to such toll evasion as "leakage." To deter such behavior, toll operators can employ tools such as high-definition cameras to identify violators, and leakage can be offset in part or whole by fees and fines collected against offenders. However, in many cases such enforcement is relatively limited (for example, targeting only commercial vehicles and other such flagrant and/or repeat offenders). Some toll operators prefer to simply write off leakage as an expense, especially if the costs associated with collection efforts are expected to exceed the additional tolls, fees and/or fines that will likely be collected, or alternatively allow vehicles that are privately operated and/or below a specified size and/or weight to access the toll road free of charge.

== History ==
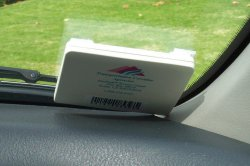
Many ETC systems use transponders like this one to electronically debit the accounts of registered cars without their stopping.

In 1959, Nobel Economics Prize winner William Vickrey was the first to propose a system of electronic tolling for the Washington metropolitan area. He proposed that each car would be equipped with a transponder. The transponder's personalized signal would be picked up when the car passed through an intersection and then relayed to a central computer which would calculate the charge according to the intersection and the time of day and add it to the car's bill.

Norway has been the world's pioneer in the widespread implementation of this technology. ETC was first introduced in Bergen, in 1986, operating together with traditional tollbooths. The first major deployment of an RFID electronic toll collection system in the United States was the TollTag system used on the Dallas North Tollway, implemented in 1989 by Amtech. The first fully automated toll highway in the world, Ontario Highway 407, opened in Canada on June 7, 1997. The highway managed to achieve this automation through the use of both RFID technology and automatic number-plate recognition.

In September 1998, Singapore became the first city in the world to implement an electronic road toll collection system for purposes of congestion pricing. Today there are many roads around the world using electronic toll collection technologies, and ORT has opened the feasibility to implement congestion pricing policies in urban areas.

== Collection methods ==
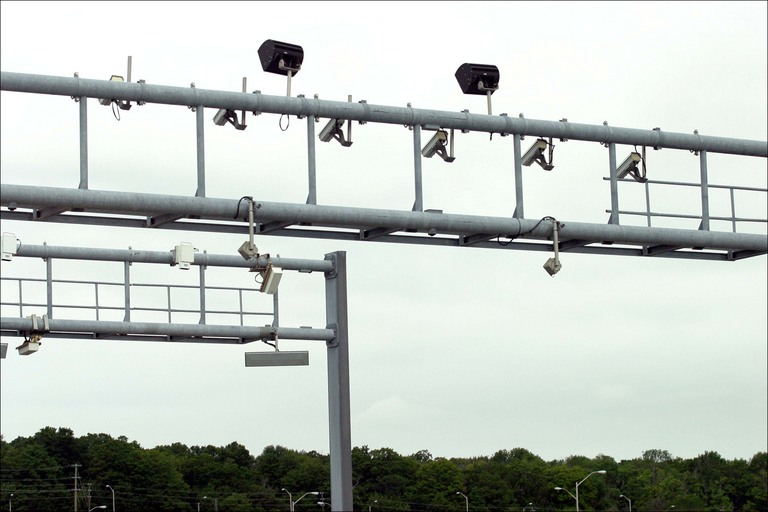
Highway 407 overhead cameras used to capture rear license plates in Ontario, Canada

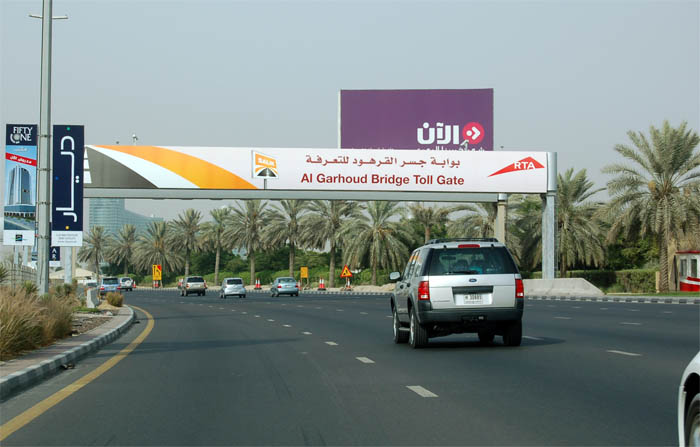
Tolls in the UAE

Collection of tolls on open toll roads is usually conducted through either the use of transponders or automatic plate recognition, the vast majority of which utilizes an overhead gantry system above the road. While rarely used as the primary vehicle identification method, automatic number plate recognition is used on a number of different highway systems. Both methods aims to eliminate the delay on toll roads by collecting tolls electronically by electronically debiting the accounts of registered car owners without requiring them to stop.

=== Transponders ===
A transponder is a receiver-transmitter that will generate a reply signal upon proper electronic interrogation. Transponders are an adaptation of military identification friend or foe technology. Most current systems rely on radio-frequency identification, where an antenna at the toll gate communicates with a transponder on the vehicle via dedicated short-range communications (DSRC). Some early systems used barcodes affixed to each vehicle, to be read optically at the toll booth. Optical systems proved to have poor reading reliability, especially when faced with inclement weather and dirty vehicles.

=== Video tolling ===
Video tolling uses manual data entry or automatic number plate recognition (ANPR), a.k.a. automatic license plate reader (ALPR), a system that uses optical character recognition on images to read the license plates on vehicles. While the technology is most commonly used by law enforcement for cataloging vehicle movements and traffic enforcement, ANPR has also been used as a method of electronic toll collection. ANPR can be used in conjunction with transponder systems. If a transponder is not detected on a vehicle, a system of cameras located at each junction logs the vehicle's unique identity, and an invoice is mailed. The use of ANPR reduces fraud related to cash transactions or non-payment, makes charging effective, and reduces the amount of required manpower to enforce the toll road, but requires expensive computer software.

However, ANPR usage raises questions over privacy and data protection. ANPR allows police to automatically compile vast databases of innocent road users' movements, thus invading their privacy. Another concern is that the collected data can be abused by employees or stolen by computer hackers. This has led the police of Scotland to delete their collection of ANPR records in 2016. As ANPR is a new technology, its use is often not tightly regulated; it is unclear whether ANPR in Scotland complied with the UK data retention laws.

== Highways using system ==
=== Canada ===
- Highway 407, ON—entire length

=== France ===
- A79 autoroute
- A13 autoroute
- A14 autoroute

=== Italy ===
- Autostrada A36 (also known as Pedemontana)
- Autostrada A33 (Italy) Autostrada del Tartufo

=== India ===
- Mumbai Trans Harbour Link (also known as Atal Setu)

=== Ireland ===
- M50 West-Link

=== New Zealand ===
All three tolled sections of New Zealand highways use ANPR. Tolls can be paid at selected gas stations, online, or by setting up an account.

- Auckland Northern Gateway
- Tauranga Eastern Link
- Tauranga Takitimu Drive

=== Poland ===
- Motorway A2, Konin – Stryków since 2021; toll booths disused, payment possible through special pre-paid ticket or by a mobile app
- Motorway A4, Wrocław – Gliwice since 2021; toll booths disused, payment possible through special pre-paid ticket or by a mobile app

=== United Kingdom ===
- Dartford Crossing - toll booths removed in November 2014
- Silvertown Tunnel
- Blackwall Tunnel - toll introduced at opening of Silvertown Tunnel
- Mersey Gateway Bridge
- Tyne Tunnel - toll booths removed in November 2021

=== United States ===
The following is a list of some of the bridges and highways in the United States that use open road tolling:

- Addison Airport Toll Tunnel—entire length
- Bayonne Bridge—Tolled for traffic going into Staten Island
- Benicia–Martinez Bridge—two lanes since 2007
- Rhode Island Route 138 along the Claiborne Pell Newport Bridge between Newport, RI and Jamestown, RI—entire length
- Dallas North Tollway—entire length
- Dolphin Expressway—entire length
- Dulles Toll Road—entire length
- Don Shula Expressway—entire length
- E-470—entire length
- Evergreen Point Floating Bridge
- Florida's Turnpike—entire length
- Grand Parkway—entire length
- Golden Gate Bridge—Tolled only for traffic going into San Francisco
- Goethals Bridge—Tolled only for traffic going into Staten Island
- Hardy Toll Road—entire length
- Illinois Tollway—entire length, Converted fully to cashless in March 2020
- Interstate 405 (Washington)—Tolled only on high-occupancy toll lanes between Bellevue and Lynnwood
- Kansas Turnpike—entire length, Converted fully to cashless in July 2024
- Lee Roy Selmon Expressway—entire length, including the elevated express lanes along the central portion of the highway (although the express lanes are not open to traffic at all times)
- Maryland Transportation Authority—entire system, including I-95 north of Baltimore, Fort McHenry Tunnel, Baltimore Harbor Tunnel, Chesapeake Bay Bridge, and Maryland Route 200
- Massachusetts Turnpike (Interstate 90)—entire length
- Maine Turnpike (Interstate 95—Mile 8.8 toll plaza in York
- New York State Thruway—entire length, toll booth removal in progress in 2021
- Orchard Pond Parkway in Leon County, Florida
- Oklahoma turnpikes converted to all-electronic tolling in November 2024.
- Outerbridge Crossing—Tolled for traffic going into Staten Island
- Pennsylvania Turnpike—Converted fully to cashless in March 2020, will move toll points from ramps to main line at a later date
- Poinciana Parkway—entire length
- President George Bush Turnpike—entire length
- Sam Houston Tollway—between Interstate 69 and Crosby Freeway; between Interstate 10 and US 90 Alt. (including the Sam Houston Ship Channel Bridge), and between the Westpark Tollway and Interstate 45
- San Francisco–Oakland Bay Bridge—Tolled only for traffic going into San Francisco
- Snapper Creek Expressway—entire length
- State Route 99 Tunnel
- Tacoma Narrows Bridge—Tolled only for traffic going into Tacoma
- U.S. Route 1 along the Maurice J. Tobin Bridge—converted to automatic open road tolling and license plate number recognition in 2014. In 2016, the $2.50 southbound-only toll was replaced with $1.25 tolls in both directions, with a 30-cent surcharge for pay-by-mail.
- U.S. Route 301 in Delaware—entire length
- Delaware Route 1—ramp tolls only; mainline toll plazas still accept cash
- Washington State Route 167—Tolled only on high-occupancy toll lanes between Renton and Pacific
- Westpark Tollway—entire length
- Will Rogers Turnpike—entire length, Converted fully to cashless in November 2024

== See also ==
- List of electronic toll collection systems
- Toll road
