= Toll roads in Belarus =

System of toll roads operating in the Republic of Belarus

BelToll is a system of toll roads operating in the Republic of Belarus.

The commercial operation of the BelToll toll collection system began on 1 August 2013. As of today, Belarus operates 1,726 kilometers of national toll roads.

== Operating principle ==
BelToll makes use of a Dedicated Short Range Communication (DSRC) solution that is operated in many countries of the world. The technology enables road users to pay toll without stopping at toll plazas (toll bars).

Along toll roads there are tolling stations (metal gantries) fitted with receiver/transmitters which enable data exchange between on-board units (OBU) mounted on the windscreen of vehicles.

When drivers pass underneath a tolling station the electronic toll collection system will automatically draw money from a driver’s OBU account. An account is created upon user registration in the system and receipt of an OBU.

There is no need either to slow down or choose a specific lane when passing underneath the tolling stations. The system allows multi-lane free-flow traffic.

== List of toll roads ==
Road	Beginning of toll road, km	End of toll road, km	Toll segment, km
M-1/E 30 Brest (Kozlovichi)–Minsk–the border of the Russian Federation (Redki)	–	609	609
M-2 Minsk–Minsk National Airport	15	42	27
M-3 Minsk–Vitebsk	9	41	32
M-4 Minsk–Mogilev	16	192	176
M-5/E 271 Minsk–Gomel	21	130	109
M-5/E 271 Minsk–Gomel	130	212	82
M-5/E 271 Minsk–Gomel	212	296	83
M-6-/E 28 Minsk–Grodno–the border of the Republic of Poland (Bruzgi)	12	57	45
M-6-/E 28 Minsk–Grodno	57	134	77
M-6-/E 28 Minsk–Grodno	196	212	16
M-6-/E 28 Minsk–Grodno–the border of the Republic of Poland (Bruzgi) / Shchuchin–Grodno	211	287	76
M-7/E 28 Minsk–Oshmyany–the border of Lithuania (Kamenny Log)	57	148	91
P-1 Minsk–Dzerzhinsk	8	35	27
P-21 Vitebsk–Liozno	9	53	41
P-23 Minsk–Mikashevichi	10	80	70
P-23 Minsk–Mikashevichi	80	99	19
P-28 Minsk–Naroch'	12	32	20
P-99 Baranovichi–Grodno	16	149	120
Approach from P-99 Baranovichi–Grodno to the Polish border	0	7	6,5

== Who should pay ==
- Drivers of motor vehicles with a maximum laden weight exceeding 3.5 tonnes;
- Drivers of motor vehicles with a maximum laden weight not exceeding 3.5 tonnes registered outside the Eurasian Economic Union (Belarus, Russia, Kazakhstan, Armenia, Kyrgyzstan).

Drivers of the following vehicles are exempt from toll payment when using the BelToll road network:

- Vehicles registered in the Eurasian Economic Union member states with a maximum laden weight of 3.5 tonnes and less and trailers towed by such vehicles;
- Mopeds and motorcycles;
- Wheeled tractors and self-propelled vehicles registered in the Republic of Belarus;
- Special operation vehicles;
- Vehicles used for the purposes of ensuring the defensive capacity and law enforcement;
- Fixed-route vehicles used for urban transportation of passengers;
- Vehicles used for emergency response or transportation of humanitarian aid to the population of the Republic of Belarus and other countries.

President of the Republic of Belarus Alexander Lukashenko signed special Decree No. 349 of 10 August 2015 to exempt from toll vehicles registered in the Donetsk and Lugansk Regions of Ukraine with a maximum laden weight not exceeding 3.5 tonnes and their trailers.

http://president.gov.by/ru/news_ru/view/kommentarij-k-ukazu-349-ot-10-avgusta-2015-g-11914/

http://www.beltoll.by/index.php/news/812-on-presidential-decree-349

== Toll rates ==
motor vehicles with a maximum laden weight of 3.5 tonnes and less	EUR 0.040 per km
2-axle motor vehicles with a maximum laden weight exceeding 3.5 tonnes	EUR 0.090 per km
3-axle motor vehicles with a maximum laden weight exceeding 3.5 tonnes	EUR 0.115 per km
4-axle (and more) motor vehicles with a maximum laden weight exceeding 3.5 tonnes	EUR 0.145 per km

== Toll payment ==
To use the network of toll roads it is necessary to equip a vehicle with an on-board unit (OBU). OBUs are available with a deposit of EUR 20 for motor vehicles with a maximum laden weight not exceeding 3.5 tonnes and EUR 50 for motor vehicles with a maximum laden weight of over 3.5 tonnes.

Toll payment can be made in cash (rubels), Visa, MasterCard (any currency), and BelKart. Further, fuel cards, including E100, Eurowag, euroShell, Berlio, and Belorusneft can be used for toll payments.

== Receiving an OBU ==
OBUs are available from a BelToll customer services points which are located next to automobile border-crossing points, along toll roads, and in all of the region centers of Belarus. They operate on a 24/7 basis. An OBU is attached to the windscreen, and whenever a vehicle passes under a gantry, the required amount is written off from the OBU account.

Some vehicles have so-called metallic (athermic) windscreens, and when driving such a vehicle, a driver should request information from the manufacturer to identify areas on the windscreen free from metal coating and attach an OBU according to the OBU User Manual.

Each time a vehicle equipped with an OBU passes through a tolling gantry, the OBU gives an acoustic signal. If there is no signal or there is more than one signal, a driver is recommended to stop using the toll road and refer to the nearest customer services point, having called the hotline at +375 172 798 798 and registered his/her inquiry.

== Substitution fee ==
In case of any violation of the procedure for the collection of toll, a Substitution Fee shall be paid by the owner (proprietor) of a vehicle.

The following events shall be regarded as violations of the toll collection procedure:

Failure to Pay

- absence of an OBU in a vehicle subject to toll payment;
- absence of a toll payment record on an OBU;
- use of an out-of-service OBU;
- use of an OBU that cannot be used to pay in compliance with the established procedure;
- use of an OBU in violation of technical operation rules;
- unlawful use of an OBU designed for exempted vehicles.

Short Payment

- use of an BU configured for fewer axles than the number prescribed by the relevant User Manual for the vehicle;
- use of an OBU that is not personalized for the vehicle.

Amounts of Substitution Fees payable for the use of toll roads in the Republic of Belarus

- Vehicles with a maximum laden weight not exceeding 3.5 tonnes: failure to pay — EUR 100; short payment — EUR 50;
- Vehicles with a maximum laden weight exceeding 3.5 tonnes: failure to pay — EUR 260; short payment — EUR 130.
