= Moving Ahead for Progress in the 21st Century Act =

US legislation (2012)

- Long title: An act to authorize funds for Federal-aid highways, highway safety programs, and transit programs, and for other purposes.
- Acronyms (colloquial): MAP-21
- Enacted by: the 112th United States Congress

Citations
- Public law: Pub. L. 112–141 (text) (PDF)
- Statutes at Large: 126 Stat. 405

Codification
- Acts amended: Transportation Equity Act for the 21st Century (MAP-21); Safe, Accountable, Flexible, Efficient Transportation Equity Act: A Legacy for Users (SAFETEA-LU)
- Titles amended: 23 U.S.C.: Highways
- U.S.C. sections amended: 23 U.S.C. § 214

Legislative history
- Introduced in the House as H.R. 4348 by John Mica (R-FL) on April 16, 2012; Passed the House on April 18, 2012 (293–127); Passed the Senate on April 24, 2012 (unanimous consent, in lieu of S. 1813 passed March 14, 2012 74–22); Reported by the joint conference committee on June 28, 2012; agreed to by the House on June 29, 2012 (373–52) and by the Senate on June 29, 2012 (74–19); Signed into law by President Barack Obama on July 6, 2012

The Moving Ahead for Progress in the 21st Century Act (MAP-21) is a funding and authorization bill to govern United States federal surface transportation spending. It was passed by Congress on June 29, 2012, and President Barack Obama signed it on July 6. The vote was 373–52 in the House of Representatives and 74–19 in the Senate.

The $105 billion two-year bill does not significantly alter total funding from the previous authorization, but does include many significant reforms. The Congressional Budget Office estimates that enacting MAP-21 will reduce the federal budget deficit over the 2012–22 period by $16.3 billion.

== Key provisions ==
- The number of funding programs is consolidated by two-thirds.
- Shortfalls in the Highway Trust Fund resulting from insufficient fuel taxes are offset by transfers from the Treasury's general fund.
- The environmental review process is reformed in an effort to speed up project development. More projects will be categorically excluded from review, and there will be a four-year review deadline enforced with financial penalties. (In 2011 the average review took 8.1 years.)
- Funding for bicycle and pedestrian transportation (primarily via rail trails) is reduced and consolidated into a broader program called "Transportation Alternatives." Half of this funding will go to metropolitan planning organizations and the other half will go to states, which may choose to use the funds for other purposes. Bicycle and rail trail advocates were highly critical of this change, anticipating a 60-70% drop in funding.
- A national freight policy will be developed.
- Tolling on federal highways is reformed. Mainstream tolling is now easier to implement in regards to new highways and expansion and repairs to existing ones. Also, electronic toll collection facilities had until October 1, 2016, to establish a nationwide interoperability agreement. No funding was provided, and no penalty was set for not meeting this deadline, and as of April 2023 it has not been met. (See List of electronic toll collection systems.)
- Banned federal funding for automated traffic enforcement outside of school zones.

== Other provisions ==
Several unrelated provisions were attached to the bill: a one-year extension of federal student loan rates through June 30, 2013; a five-year reauthorization of the National Flood Insurance Program through 2017; and a one-year extension to the Secure Rural Schools Act, which compensates rural counties for loss of revenue caused by reduced timber harvest on federal lands. The bill also contains a provision allowing the State Department to revoke, deny, or limit passports for anyone the Internal Revenue Service certifies as having "a seriously delinquent tax debt in an amount in excess of $50,000." The Act also made further changes to the Uniform Relocation Assistance and Real Property Acquisition Act.

== Revenue sources ==
MAP-21 is funded without increasing transportation user fees. (The federal gas tax was last raised in 1993.) Instead, funds were generated through the following measures:

- Repeal a requirement that the Department of Transportation reimburse the difference in cost between shipping foreign food aid on a U.S.-flag vessel and a foreign-flag vessel
- Raise additional revenue by increasing the ability of business with excess assets in their pension funds to use them for retiree health and life insurance benefits, and by defining businesses that make roll-your-own machines available for consumer use as tobacco manufacturers
- Change the interest rate that pension plans use to measure their liabilities, increase pension premium rates for both variable and flat rate premium paid to the Pension Benefit Guaranty Corporation and establish a cap on the variable rate premium
- Allow eligible federal employees to enter into a phased retirement, during which they continue to work part-time while drawing a partial salary and a partial civil service annuity
