= Uniform Relocation Assistance and Real Property Acquisition Act (1970) =

Ensure fair compensation and assistance under eminent domain

The Uniform Relocation Assistance and Real Property Acquisition Policies Act (1970) ("URA") was passed by the U.S. federal government in 1970. It was intended to ensure fair compensation and assistance for those whose property was compulsorily acquired for public use under eminent domain law. Similar provisions have been introduced by most of the individual states.

== History and purpose ==
=== Constitutional rights and pre-URA programs ===
The Fifth Amendment's Takings clause does not provide for the compensation of relocation expenses if the government takes a citizen's property. Therefore, until 1962, citizens displaced by a federal project were guaranteed just compensation for the property taken by the government, but had no legal right or benefit for the expenses they paid to relocate.

Prior to the URA's passing, starting in 1962, the federal government acted under two separate legislative programs to handle relocation caused by urban blight renewal and federal highway expansion. In addition to these programs, several federal agencies, such as the Federal Aeronautics Administration, had their own compensation regulations for compensating displaced individuals. However, all benefits from these programs were quite small.

To provide better benefits to displaced individuals and to make the treatment of those individuals more uniform, Congress passed the URA in 1970 which abrogated the existing patchwork scheme of relocation assistance.

In the Act, Congress declared its purpose in enacting the URA to be the establishment of:

A uniform policy for the fair and equitable treatment of persons displaced as a result of Federal and federally assisted programs in order that such persons shall not suffer disproportionate injuries as a result of programs designed for the benefit of the public as a whole.

=== Constitutional and legal challenges ===
In 1972, tenants of foreclosed properties who were not eligible for URA benefits challenged the constitutionality of the URA in the United States District Court for the Eastern District of New York. The Court rejected this argument and the United States Court of Appeals for the Second Circuit affirmed the decision.

Nonetheless, the URA generated litigation due to dislocated parties' various interpretations of the Act's language. Moreover, enactment of the URA without corresponding regulations "resulted in significant differences in administration of relocation benefits by various state and federal programs." For instance, utilities and billboard/signage businesses were often required to sue in order to qualify for benefits under the URA due to the Act's ambiguous provisions.

As a result of the Act's deficiencies, in 1985, a presidential memorandum from President Ronald Reagan made changes to the Act's implementation, including the designation of the U.S. Department of Transportation as the lead agency for URA regulation promulgation purposes.

=== Surface Transportation and Uniform Relocation Assistance Act of 1987 ===
Following lengthy congressional hearings due to the URA's failings, Congress passed the Surface Transportation and Uniform Relocation Assistance Act of 1987 which significantly amended the URA.

Important amendments made to the definition section by the 1987 act include:

- Rewriting the definitions of "Federal agency" and "State agency" to address the use of eminent domain by quasi-public urban renewal corporations;
- Rewriting (and significantly expanding) the definition for "displaced person" to address the practical effects of pre-taking announcements on areas not yet acquired by a government and/or state agency;
- Redefining "federal financial assistance" and adding definitions for the terms "State, "displacing agency," and "utility facilities"; and
- Liberalized the definition of "mortgage interest differential";

The Act also significantly increased the moving and related expenses covered by the URA and increased the maximum replacement housing allowance for homeowners to $22,500. It also ensured that relocation assistance payments were not considered income subject to taxation under the law, or considered in agency determination's of the displaced person's federal aid eligibility, other than low-income housing assistance. Finally, the Act codified the 1985 presidential memorandum.

=== Statutory amendments and regulatory updates ===
A 1997 amendment to the act amended the definition of "displaced person" under the URA to exclude "illegal aliens".

In 2005, an expansive update of URA regulations was completed by the Federal Highway Administration ("FHWA") (a division of the Department of Transportation). The regulations further liberalized the definition of "displaced person", added a definition for "mobile home", and created a new subpart setting forth the URA's applicability to mobile home occupants displaced by a federal or federally-assisted project.

In 2012, President Barack Obama signed the Moving Ahead for Progress in the 21st Century Act ("MAP-21") which made further changes to the URA, specifically increasing the amount of benefits given to displacees. Using the authority given to it in MAP-21, the U.S. Department of Transportation published a proposed final rule in December 2022, proposing further changes to URA regulations. These proposed regulatory changes would, among other things, bring URA regulations into alignment with MAP-21.

== The Act's Provisions ==
=== Eligibility ===
The Act's provisions only apply to displaced persons, which it defines as:

(i) any person who moves from real property, or moves his personal property from real property-

(I) as a direct result of a written notice of intent to acquire or the acquisition of such real property in whole or in part for a program or project undertaken by a Federal agency or with Federal financial assistance; or

(II) on which such person is a residential tenant or conducts a small business, a farm operation, or a business defined in paragraph (7)(D), as a direct result of rehabilitation, demolition, or such other displacing activity as the lead agency may prescribe, under a program or project undertaken by a Federal agency or with Federal financial assistance in any case in which the head of the displacing agency determines that such displacement is permanent; and

(ii) solely for the purposes of sections 4622(a) and (b) and 4625 of this title, any person who moves from real property, or moves his personal property from real property-

(I) as a direct result of a written notice of intent to acquire or the acquisition of other real property, in whole or in part, on which such person conducts a business or farm operation, for a program or project undertaken by a Federal agency or with Federal financial assistance; or

(II) as a direct result of rehabilitation, demolition, or such other displacing activity as the lead agency may prescribe, of other real property on which such person conducts a business or a farm operation, under a program or project undertaken by a Federal agency or with Federal financial assistance where the head of the displacing agency determines that such displacement is permanent.

=== Benefits ===
If a person is eligible for URA benefits, they are entitled to either actual reasonable moving expenses or a moving expense allowance which is determined by the administering agency according to schedules (created via federal regulations) which dictate the amount of benefits allowed to be distributed. The Department of Transportation manages the distribution allowance schedules and posts notices in the Federal Register when a region distribution schedule is being changed.

A displacee “is entitled to payment of his or her actual moving and related expenses, as the Agency determines to be reasonable and necessary.” As of December 2022, the moving cost payments permitted under the URA are stated in 49 C.F.R. § 24.301. Courts determining the reasonableness of an agency's decision to reimburse moving expenses have used the "arbitrary and capricious" standard in the past.

=== Administration and other requirements ===
While the U.S. Department of Transportation serves as the lead agency for URA regulatory promulgation and implementation coordination, each federal agency is responsible for URA compliance and administration across their own programs and activities. The U.S. Department of Housing and Urban Development's website details general requirements under the URA, including notice requirements, pre-negotiation appraisals, offers, and payments prior to possession, with focus placed on URA compliance and implementation across its own programs.

== The states' response to the URA ==
Most states have enacted similar legislation and require very similar relocation compensation for displacement by state-level activities. Typically, the language of their statutes mirror that of the URA, though of late, some states have raised the amounts of compensation for dislocated businesses, with both goodwill and business value as traits of respective statutes. Connecticut's parallel version of the URA is one that attempts to compensate goodwill to non-chain businesses by allowing one to claim up to $10,000.00 of one's annual net income due to loss of a "substantial part of their patronage." Connecticut provides that a state agency can choose to utilize the compensation levels under the Federal URA in lieu of the state's act. Its own relocation compensation requirements are lower than the URA's.

The URA addresses federal interaction with the states regarding the funding of projects and compensation of owners. Any state agency receiving funding from a federal counterpart must demonstrate similar compensation efforts as that of the Act (albeit there is no indication that the state's benefits must be the same or higher), and that federal agency is prohibited from supplying the monies unless it has received the appropriate assurances from the state that fair and reasonable compensation is made for an owner's relocation.
