= MooneyGo =

Italian mobility service

Logo

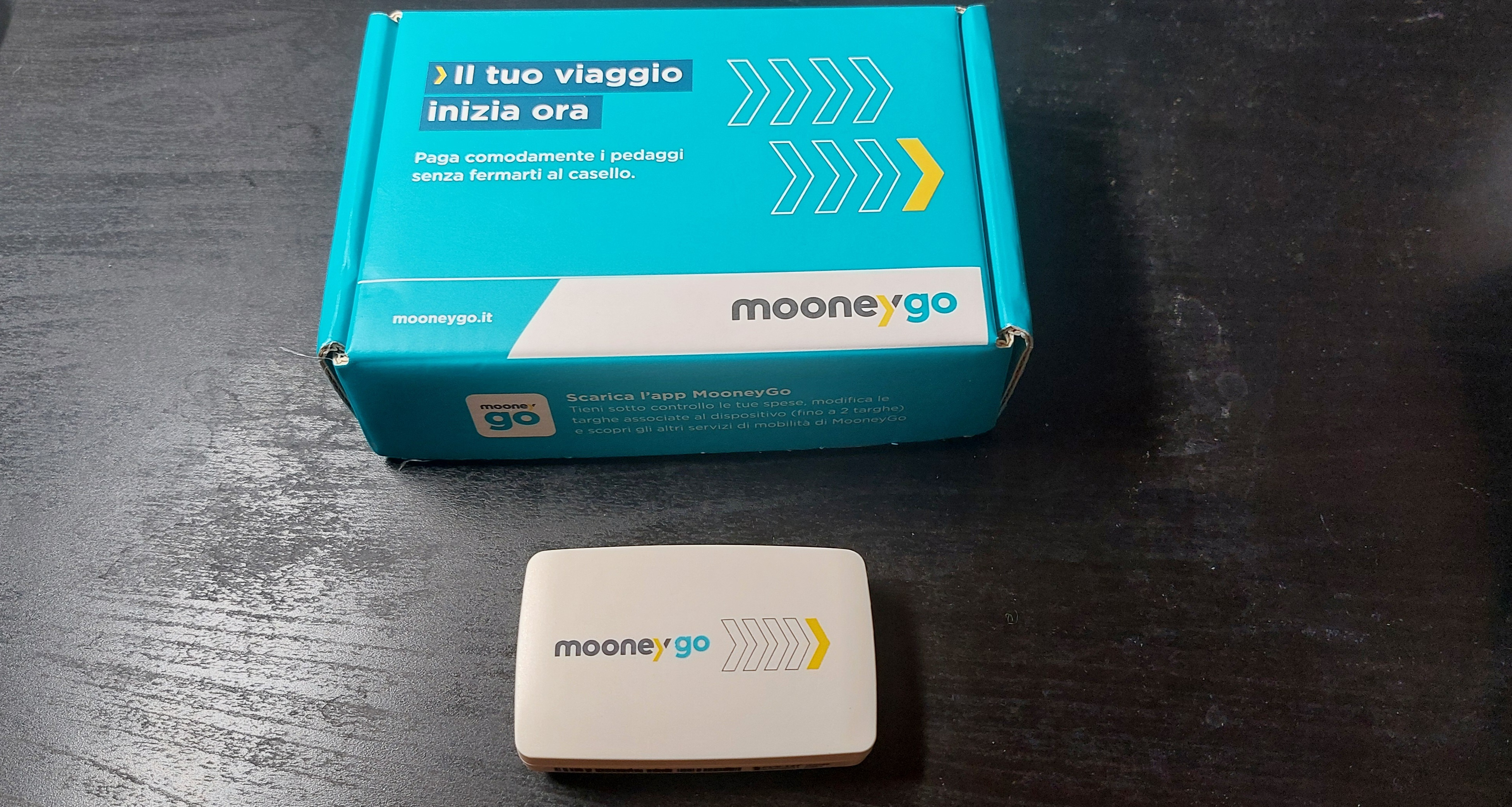
A MooneyGo device with its box

MooneyGo is a mobility service created and managed by the Italian company Mooney which also includes the electronic toll collection system with the same name.

The service began operating on November 11, 2020, while the electronic toll collection system began operating in September 2023, after receiving the official patent to operate on Italian roads.
