= US Mobile Tolling Platforms =

On roadways around the United States, radio-frequency identification (RFID) transponders, supporting transceivers, antennas, and video cameras are the current standard for the collection of toll fees. This technology was invented during the 1970s and was implemented throughout the 1980s and 1990s. Today, the fastest growing payment technologies center around smart phones. These devices are beginning to permit tolling authorities new channels of toll collection and communication with drivers. There are a number of mobile applications that are available for drivers to use as a way to manage their toll accounts as well as applications that actually allow the consumer to pay tolls from their smart phone.

== Toll applications ==
=== neoRide ===
Application Name: neoRide

Roadways: neoRide is available in 95% of the toll roads operating in the United States.

Capabilities: Allows users to pay for their tolls on their registered vehicles or rental cars using their license plate number. Tolls can be pay as you go or by using a pre-paid deposit. neoRide users can also search for, reserve, and book parking spots in the US.

=== Uproad ===
Application Name: Uproad
Roadways: Uproad was available for toll roads in: California, Delaware, Florida, Illinois, Indiana, Kansas, Kentucky, Maine, Maryland, Massachusetts, New Hampshire, New Jersey, New York, North Carolina, Oklahoma, Pennsylvania, Virginia, Texas, and West Virginia.
Capabilities: Allowed you to pay for tolls on your personal or rental cars, commercial vehicles, and motorcycles. Users were able to use the app to manage up to 10 vehicles, track their toll expenses, plan trips, monitor pending toll charges, and offset their carbon footprint with a single account. Offered violation protection to protect against toll authority violation tickets. Owned by parent company Kapsch. Offered a pay-as-you-go option and memberships.

=== Ecotoll ===
Application Name: Ecotoll
Roadways: Available for toll roads in: California, Delaware, Florida, Ohio, North Carolina, Illinois, Indiana, Kansas, Kentucky, Maine, Maryland, Massachusetts, Minnesota, New Hampshire, New Jersey, New York, Virginia and West Virginia.
Capabilities: Allows you to pay for tolls on your personal or rental cars, and motorcycles. Use the app to track your toll expenses, plan your trips, and offset your carbon footprint with a single account.

=== Peasy ===
Application Name: Peasy
Roadways: Was available for toll roads in: California, Colorado, Delaware, Florida, Georgia, Illinois, Kansas, Kentucky, Massachusetts, Maryland, Maine, North Carolina, New Hampshire, New Jersey, New York, Texas, Virginia, Washington and West Virginia.
Capabilities: Allowed users with or without a transponder device or a toll account to register vehicles for toll coverage with no pre-funding requirements. Automatically paid tolls via a credit card. A mobile phone was not required for toll location validation. Eliminated missed payments, violations, toll fines and penalties while using approved toll ways.

=== Tollmate ===
Application Name: Tollmate
Toll Authority: North Texas Toll Authority
Capabilities: Gives users the ability to log into their transponder accounts and view history, add money to their balance, contact customer service, and calculate toll fees

- Update: In May 2016 the app received an update that now provides push notification to help users manager their toll tag account

=== BancPass ===
Application Name: PlusPass
Toll Authority: All toll roads in Texas, Georgia and the State of Washington, agreements pending with E-Z Pass system(s), Colorado and California Agencies
Roadways: All toll roads in Texas, Florida and Washington State
Capabilities: Provides the ability for users to add their vehicle information and pay tolls.
Patents: Awarded patent #9,691,061 "System for Electronic Toll Payment". Additional patents pending.

=== FastToll ===
Application Name: FastToll
Toll Authority: None
Roadways: Illinois Tollways
Capabilities: FastToll allows users to track tolls on the Illinois Tollway roads. The tolls can be then paid through the app within 7 days. The app issues reminders ensuring that tolls are paid timely. Available on both Android and Apple iOS platforms.

=== IPass Manager ===
Application Name: IPass Manager
Toll Authority: None
Roadways: Illinois Tollways
Capabilities: Allows users to manage their Illinois I-PASS toll transponder account. I-Pass Manager users may check their balance, add funds, view their toll history, and manage credit card or vehicle information. Available on both Android and Apple iOS platforms.

=== PayTollo ===
Application Name: PayTollo
Toll Authority: Agreement with Central Florida Expressway
Roadways: The state of Florida, Georgia, North Carolina, Orange County (TCA) California.
Capabilities: Provided users the ability to register a vehicle, use the phone's GPS to observe toll crossings, allow real time payment, avoid the pay by mail system for tolls crossed without their phone and integrates with toll authorities back office systems.
Patents: Patent Pending for "MOBILE DEVICE AND NAVIGATION DEVICE TOLL PAYING SYSTEM AND METHOD "

- Update: In January 2016 the Central Florida Expressway began testing of the platform
- Update: In July 2016 the platform was opened up to the general public for up to 1,000 users
- Update: In 2023, for some unknown reason, PayTollo announced it was decommissioning the service on April 11, 2023

=== The Toll Roads ===
Application Name: The Toll Roads
Toll Authority: FastTrak
Roadways: California
Capabilities: Gives users the ability to log into their transponder accounts and view history, add money to their balance, contact customer service, and calculate toll fees
