= Bompengeselskap Nord =

Norwegian municipal company

Bompengeselskap Nord AS
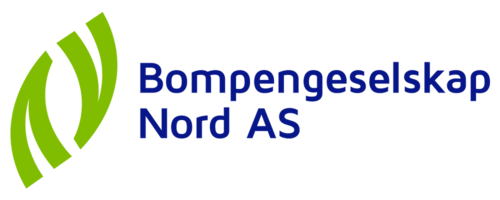
- Type: Municipal owned
- Industry: Toll roads in Norway
- Founded: 2016
- Headquarters: Narvik, Norway
- Area served: Nordland, Troms and Finnmark
- Operating income: NOK 2 503' kr (2017)
- Owner: Nordland, Troms and Finnmark
- Number of employees: 7
- Website: bomveinord.no

Bompengeselskap Nord AS is a Norwegian toll company owned by Nordland, Troms and Finnmark counties. The company was created 17 August 2016 and is headquartered in Narvik. All toll roads in Norway have a toll road operator responsible for the financing of the road project. The right to demand payment of toll charges is granted when a toll charge agreement is entered into with the Norwegian Public Roads Administration.

Bompengeselskap Nord is one of the regional toll companies created following the Government’s decision to merge the toll companies into five regional companies. The Government signed a new toll charge agreement with the company on 10 October 2018. The reform was proposed by Prime minister Solberg's cabinet and has four parts – a reduction of toll road operators, separation of the toll service provision for tolls and ferry tickets from the toll road companies, an interest compensation scheme for toll road loans, and a simplification of the price and discount schemes.

== Projects ==
All of BPS Nord's toll stations use the Norwegian electronic toll collection system AutoPASS. A valid AutoPASS or EasyGo transponder (such as BroBizz) are valid in Norwegian toll stations through the EasyGo partnership.

=== Projects in the region ===
- BPS Nord - Nordland Bompengeselskap AS
- BPS Nord - Troms Bompengeselskap AS
- BPS Nord - Helgeland Veiutvikling AS
- BPS Nord - Veipakke Salten AS
- BPS Nord - Hålogalandsbrua AS
- Ryaforbindelsen AS

== See also ==
- Ferde
- Fjellinjen
- Vegamot
- Vegfinans
