= Ferde =

Norwegian municipal company

Ferde AS
- Type: Municipal owned
- Industry: Toll roads in Norway
- Founded: 2016
- Headquarters: Bergen, Norway
- Area served: Agder, Rogaland and Vestland
- Operating income: NOK 72 955' kr (2017)
- Owner: Agder, Rogaland and Vestland
- Number of employees: 72
- Website: ferde.no

Ferde AS is a Norwegian toll company owned by Agder, Rogaland and Vestland counties. The company was created on 5 October 2016 is headquartered in Bergen. The company was called Sørvest Bomvegselskap AS until 1 January 2018. All toll roads in Norway have a toll road operator responsible for the financing of the road project. The right to demand payment of toll charges is granted when a toll charge agreement is entered into with the Norwegian Public Roads Administration.

Ferde AS is one of the regional toll companies created following the Government's decision to merge the toll companies into five regional companies. The Government signed a new toll charge agreement with the company on 24 November 2017. The reform was proposed by Prime minister Solberg's cabinet and has four parts – a reduction of toll road operators, separation of the toll service provision for tolls and ferry tickets from the toll road companies, an interest compensation scheme for toll road loans, and a simplification of the price and discount schemes.

== Projects ==
22 existing companies and projects are being transferred to the regional company. Furthermore, all new toll projects in the region will be conducted under Ferde in the future.

All of Ferdes' toll stations uses the Norwegian electronic toll collection system AutoPASS. A valid AutoPASS or EasyGo transponder (such as BroBizz) are valid in Norwegian toll stations through the EasyGo partnership.

=== Projects in the region ===
- Askøypakken
- Austevollbrua
- Bomringen i Bergen
- Bomringen i Kristiansand
- Bymiljøpakken Nord-Jæren
- Bømlopakken
- E18 Tvedestrand - Arendal
- E134 Åkrafjorden
- Finnfast
- Førdepakken
- Fv.45 Gjesdal
- Hardangerbrua
- Haugalandspakken
- Jondalstunnelen
- Kvammapakken
- Nordhordlandspakken (From 1 December 2019)
- Rogfast
- T-forbindelsen
- Vossapakko

== See also ==
- Fjellinjen
- Vegfinans
- Vegamot
- Bompengeselskap Nord
