= Vegamot =

Norwegian municipal company

Vegamot AS
- Company type: Municipal owned
- Industry: Toll roads in Norway
- Founded: 1983
- Headquarters: Trondheim, Norway
- Area served: Trøndelag and Møre og Romsdal
- Operating income: NOK 953 981' kr (2017)
- Owner: Trøndelag and Møre og Romsdal
- Number of employees: 32
- Website: vegamot.no

Vegamot AS is a Norwegian toll company owned by Trøndelag and Møre og Romsdal counties. The company was created in 1983 and is headquartered in Trondheim. All toll roads in Norway have a toll road operator responsible for the financing of the road project. The right to demand payment of toll charges is granted when a toll charge agreement is entered into with the Norwegian Public Roads Administration.

Vegamot is one of the regional toll companies created following the Government’s decision to merge the toll companies into five regional companies. The Government signed a new toll charge agreement with the company on 18 August 2017. The reform was proposed by Prime minister Solberg's cabinet and has four parts – a reduction of toll road operators, separation of the toll service provision for tolls and ferry tickets from the toll road companies, an interest compensation scheme for toll road loans, and a simplification of the price and discount schemes.

== Projects ==
All of Vegamot's toll stations uses the Norwegian electronic toll collection system AutoPASS. A valid AutoPASS or EasyGo transponder (such as BroBizz) are valid in Norwegian toll stations through the EasyGo partnership. The only manual toll road left in Norway is the Atlantic Ocean Tunnel. The tunnel is within Vegamot's region, but has not been transferred to Vegamot.

=== Projects in the region ===
- Miljøpakken Trondheim
- E6 Trondheim - Stjørdal
- Eksportvegen
- Fv 714 Lakseveien
- Krinsvatn
- Namdalsprosjektet
- Fv17/Fv720 (Estimated from december 2019)
- E6 Vindåsliene (Estimated from summer 2020)

== See also ==
- Ferde
- Fjellinjen
- Vegfinans
- Bompengeselskap Nord AS
