= Fjellinjen =

Norwegian toll company

Fjellinjen AS
- Company type: Municipal owned
- Industry: Toll roads in Norway
- Founded: 1986
- Headquarters: Oslo, Norway
- Area served: Oslo, Viken
- Revenue: NOK 3.1 billion kr (2017)
- Owner: City of Oslo; Viken
- Number of employees: 48
- Website: www.fjellinjen.no

Fjellinjen AS is a toll company owned by the City of Oslo (60%) and Viken County Municipality (40%). It is responsible for toll collection from the toll ring around Oslo, having nineteen toll plazas. All toll roads in Norway have a toll road operator responsible for financing the road project. The right to demand payment of toll charges is granted when a toll charge agreement is entered into with the Norwegian Public Roads Administration.

Fjellinjen is one of the regional toll companies created following the Government's decision to merge the toll companies into five regional companies. Fjellinjen became the first regional company when Minister of Transportation and Communications Ketil Solvik-Olsen signed a new toll charge agreement with the company. The reform was proposed by Prime Minister Solberg's cabinet and has four parts – a reduction of toll road operators, separation of the toll service provision for tolls and ferry tickets from the toll road companies, an interest compensation scheme for toll road loans, and a simplification of the price and discount schemes.

Fjellinjen toll stations use the Norwegian electronic toll collection system AutoPASS. Valid AutoPASS transponders are valid in Norwegian toll stations, in addition to EasyGo transponders (such as BroBizz) through the EasyGo partnership.

== History ==
The company was created on 13 February 1986 to finance the 1,800-metre-long (5,900 ft) Festning Tunnel on E18 through Oslo, completed in 1990. On 8 June 1988, the Norwegian Parliament granted permission for further collection through Oslo Package 1, a program to expand parts of the highways in the capital. Following this, Akershus County Municipality bought 40% of the company in 1990. Financing was partially to come through a toll ring around the city. From 1 November 2001, Fjellinjen was also to collect money for Oslo Package 2, financing several expansions to the public transport around Oslo. From 1 January 2008 to the latest 31 December 2012, the ring and Fjellinjen will finance the Bjørvika Tunnel as well. Starting in 2008, Oslo Package 3 will also be financed through the company.

== See also ==
- Bompengeselskap Nord
- Ferde
- Vegamot
- Vegfinans
