= Vegfinans =

Norwegian toll company

Vegfinans AS
- Company type: Municipal owned
- Industry: Toll roads in Norway
- Founded: 2001
- Headquarters: Drammen, Norway
- Area served: Akershus, Buskerud, Innlandet, Telemark, Vestfold and Østfold
- Operating income: NOK 31 865' kr (2017)
- Owner: Akershus, Buskerud, Innlandet, Telemark, Vestfold and Østfold
- Number of employees: 25
- Website: vegfinans.no

Vegfinans AS is a Norwegian toll company owned by the counties Akershus, Buskerud, Innlandet, Telemark, Vestfold and Østfold. The company was created on 14 February 2001 and is headquartered in Drammen. All toll roads in Norway have a toll road operator responsible for the financing of the road project. The right to demand payment of toll charges is granted when a toll charge agreement is entered into with the Norwegian Public Roads Administration.

Vegfinans AS is one of the regional toll companies created following the Government’s decision to merge the toll companies into five regional companies. The Government signed a new toll charge agreement with the company on 17 November 2017. The reform was proposed by Prime minister Solberg's cabinet and has four parts – a reduction of toll road operators, separation of the toll service provision for tolls and ferry tickets from the toll road companies, an interest compensation scheme for toll road loans, and a simplification of the price and discount schemes.

== Projects ==
Vegfinans AS consists of 20 wholly owned subsidiaries located in the region. Furthermore, Vegfinans provides administrative duties for an additional four companies that exist both within and outside the parent company.

All of Vegfinans' toll stations uses the Norwegian electronic toll collection system AutoPASS. A valid AutoPASS or EasyGo transponder (such as BroBizz) are valid in Norwegian toll stations through the EasyGo partnership.

=== Projects in the region ===
- Bypakke Grenland
- E16 Oppland
- E6 Oppland
- Fv34 Oppland
- Østfold Bompengeselskap
- Bypakke Nedre Glomma
- E18 Vestfold
- E6 Ringebu - Otta
- Gausdalsvegene
- Oslofjordtunnelen
- E16 Kongsvingervegene
- E6 Gardermoen - Moelv
- Fv33 Oppland
- Hallingporten
- Tønsberg Hovedvegfinans
- E134 Buskerud
- Rv4 Oppland

== See also ==
- Bompengeselskap Nord
- Ferde
- Fjellinjen
- Vegamot
