= Toll roads in Norway =

The Norwegian sign for toll road, road sign 765. The "Kr" symbol is added on direction signs on roads leading to toll stations. This is the only sign posted prior to the station itself except for in city areas where a new 560-zone sign is posted on city limits.

Road tolling to finance bridges, tunnels and roads has a long history in Norway. The cities Oslo, Bergen and Trondheim introduced toll rings between 1986 and 1991 as a means to discourage urban traffic and to finance infrastructure projects around those cities, including the Trondheim toll scheme. Today toll rings circumscribe Oslo, Kristiansand, Stavanger, Haugesund, Bergen, Askøy, Bodø, Harstad, Grenland, Førde and Trondheim. Besides toll rings, road tolls are installed to finance certain road projects, and often also on the existing road to discourage people from using it. Some tolls use congestion pricing and/or environmentally differentiated toll rates.

There is an ongoing reform of the road toll sector, proposed by Prime minister Solberg's Cabinet. The toll reform has four parts: a reduction of the number of toll road operators, separation of the toll service provision for tolls and ferry tickets from the toll road operators, an interest compensation scheme for toll road loans, and a simplification of the price and discount schemes.

== AutoPASS ==
The Norwegian electronic toll collection system is called AutoPASS, and is administrated by the Norwegian Public Roads Administration. There are no manual toll stations left. The system involves the installation of a DSRC based radio transponder operating at 5.8 GHz (MD5885), originally supplied by the Norwegian companies Q-Free and Fenrits, and since 2013 supplied by Kapsch and Norbit, on the windscreen of a vehicle, and to sign a contract with one of the toll service providers. With an AutoPASS contract it is also possible to use the tag in Denmark and Sweden on ferries and bridges through the EasyGo partnership.

In December 2021, the Norwegian Public Roads Administration withdrew from EasyGo starting a transition period until 31 March 2022. Providers need to be EETS-registered and approved by the operators in order for the OBE to be valid in those toll facilities after the transition period ends.

Road sign 792.30 indicates an automatic toll station. According to the latest template on road signage in automatic toll stations, this sign shall be posted on the toll station, and the only sign posted prior to passing the station itself is a "Kr" symbol that is added on the direction signs on roads leading to the toll station.

If a vehicle passes through a toll station without a valid transponder, a photograph is taken of the registration number. Norwegian-registered vehicles are invoiced directly by the toll road operators, and foreign vehicles are invoiced by Epass24. If a foreign vehicle is driven through a toll that uses environmentally differentiated toll rates, the highest rate will be charged unless the vehicle's Euro class and fuel type are registered. Registration is optional, but registering to the scheme, which is called "Visitors' Payment" will, in addition to the avoidance of paying the highest fee in tolls with environmentally differentiated rates, normally reduce the time from the journey until an invoice is received. The account also gives access to the invoices, the possibility to register for e-mail delivery and to make the payment.

If driving a rental car, the renter should register the car to receive the invoice directly. If it is not registered, the invoice will be sent to the rental company (the car owner). The company may add administration fees when collecting the amount from the renter.

=== Compulsory tag for heavy commercial vehicles over 3.5 tonnes ===
All vehicles that exceed 3.5 tonnes (3.4 long tons; 3.9 short tons) and are primarily used for business, or are registered to a business, government, county municipality or municipality, must have a valid toll tag/agreement when driving on Norwegian public roads.

== Rates and discounts ==
Rate groups and tag discounts
	Rate group 1	Rate group 2
	Vehicles weighing up to 3,500 kilograms (7,700 lb); Vehicles in vehicle group M1, regardless of weight	Vehicles heavier than 3,501 kilograms (7,718 lb); Exception vehicles in vehicle group M1 with a valid tag
	For vehicles in vehicle group M1 with a weight exceeding 3,500 kilograms (7,700 lb), an electronic tag and valid contract is required.	Mandatory tag: Vehicles registered to companies, or vehicles used for commercial purposes are required to have an electronic tag and a valid contract.
Vehicle groups with environmentally differentiated toll rates	Rate group 1 is divided into: zero-emissions vehicles; plug-in hybrids; diesel; other (petrol, gas, ethanol, etc.)	Rate group 2 is divided into: zero-emissions vehicles; plug-in hybrids; Euro VI; Pre-Euro VI
General tag discount	20%	0%

Through the process of Prop. 1 S Appendix 2 / Innst. 13 S (2015-2016), the Storting has endorsed the government's proposal to introduce a new tariff and discount system for tolling projects. In the new system, there will be a standardization of discounts. Vehicles in pricing group 1 with electronic tag and valid agreement will automatically receive 20 per cent discount. Vehicles in rate group 2 will not get a discount. Discount and other benefits is only given to vehicles with a valid tag/agreement, "Visitors' Payment" does not give the same benefits.

Toll fees for zero-emission vehicles in rate group 1 is introduced in a growing number of tolling projects. Zero-emission vehicle is a collective name for electric cars and hydrogen cars, and the toll fee is maximum 50% of ordinary toll fee after discount (i.e. if the toll fee is 10 NOK, it costs 8 NOK for those with a valid tag/agreement. The toll fee for zero-emission vehicles can hence be maximum 4 NOK). The introduction of payment for zero-emission vehicles is done according to the instructions from Prop. 87 S (2017-2018) and local government. Payment of tolls as a zero-emission vehicle requires tag and a valid agreement. Without a tag and a valid agreement, zero-emission vehicles will be charged ordinary fare like other vehicles. The exception is in tolls that has environmentally differentiated rates (currently the toll rings in Oslo and Akershus and in Bergen). In these, an agreement is only needed to get the general tag discount on top of the (lower) zero-emission price rate.

== Toll road operators ==
A toll road operator, who has signed a toll charge agreement with Statens vegvesen is responsible for the financing of all toll roads in Norway. As a consequence of the toll reform, regional toll road operators, owned jointly by the counties, have been created:

- Bompengeselskap Nord AS (Nordland, Troms, and Finnmark)
- Vegamot AS (Møre og Romsdal and Trøndelag)
- Ferde AS (Agder, Rogaland, and Vestland)
- Vegfinans AS (Akershus, Buskerud, Innlandet, Vestfold, Telemark, and Østfold)
- Fjellinjen AS (Oslo and Akershus)

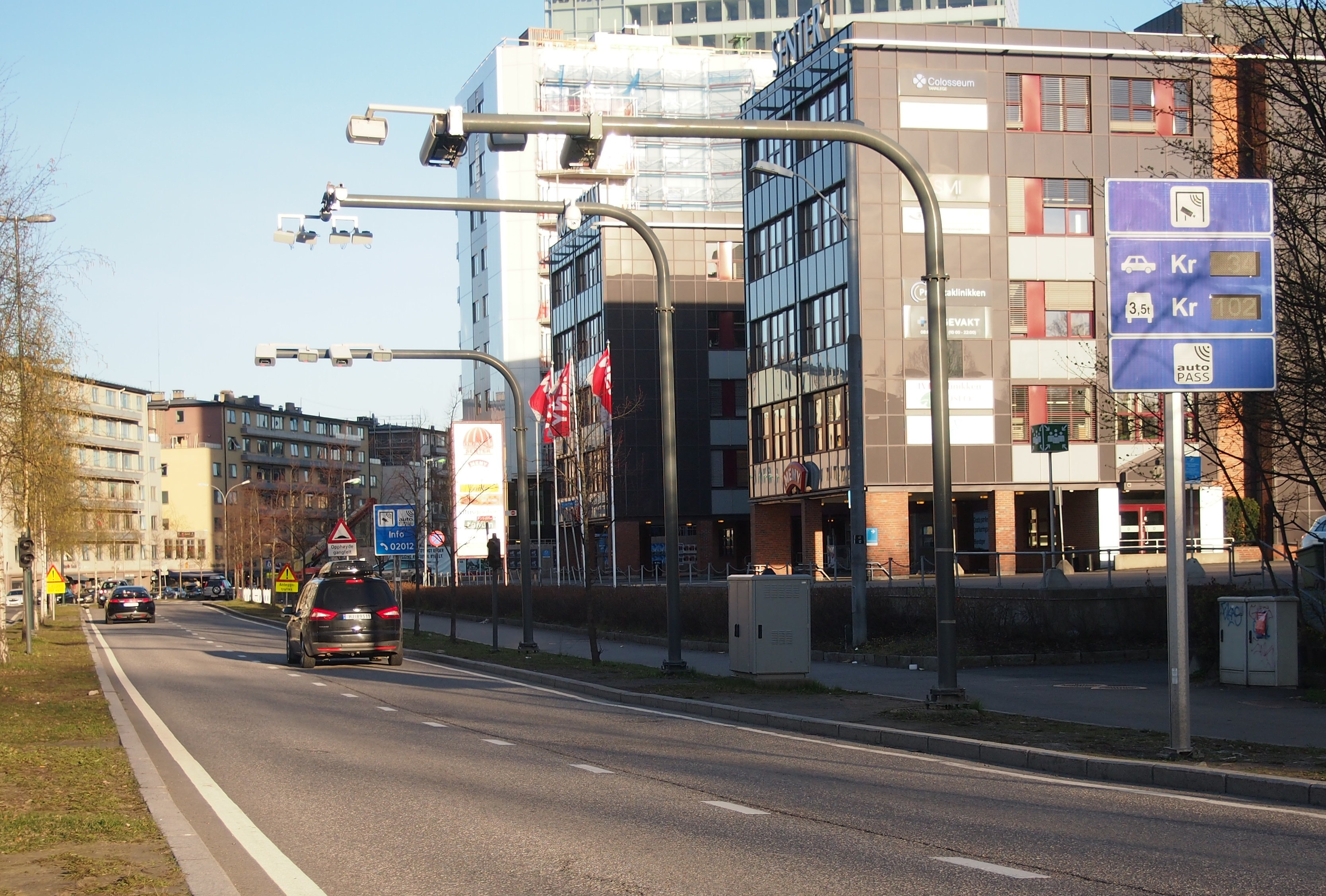
Oslo Toll Ring

== Toll rings ==
City/Region	Package/Project	County	Toll road operator
Oslo and Akershus	Oslopakke 3	Oslo, Akershus	Fjellinjen AS
Kristiansand	Samferdselspakke for Kristiansandsregionen	Agder	Ferde AS
Nord-Jæren	Bymiljøpakken	Rogaland	Ferde AS
Haugalandet	Haugalandspakken	Rogaland, Vestland	Ferde AS
Bergen	Miljøløftet	Vestland	Ferde AS
Askøy	Askøypakken	Vestland	Ferde AS
Bodø	Bypakke Bodø	Nordland	BPS Nord - Veipakke Salten AS
Fredrikstad	Bypakke Nedre Glomma	Østfold	Vegfinans Bypakke Nedre Glomma AS
Førde	Førdepakken	Vestland	Ferde AS
Grenland	Bypakke Grenland	Telemark	Vegfinans Bypakke Grenland AS
Harstad	Harstadpakken	Troms	BPS Nord - Troms Bompengeselskap AS
Nordhordland	Nordhordlandspakken	Vestland	Ferde AS
Trondheim	Miljøpakke Trondheim	Trøndelag	Vegamot AS

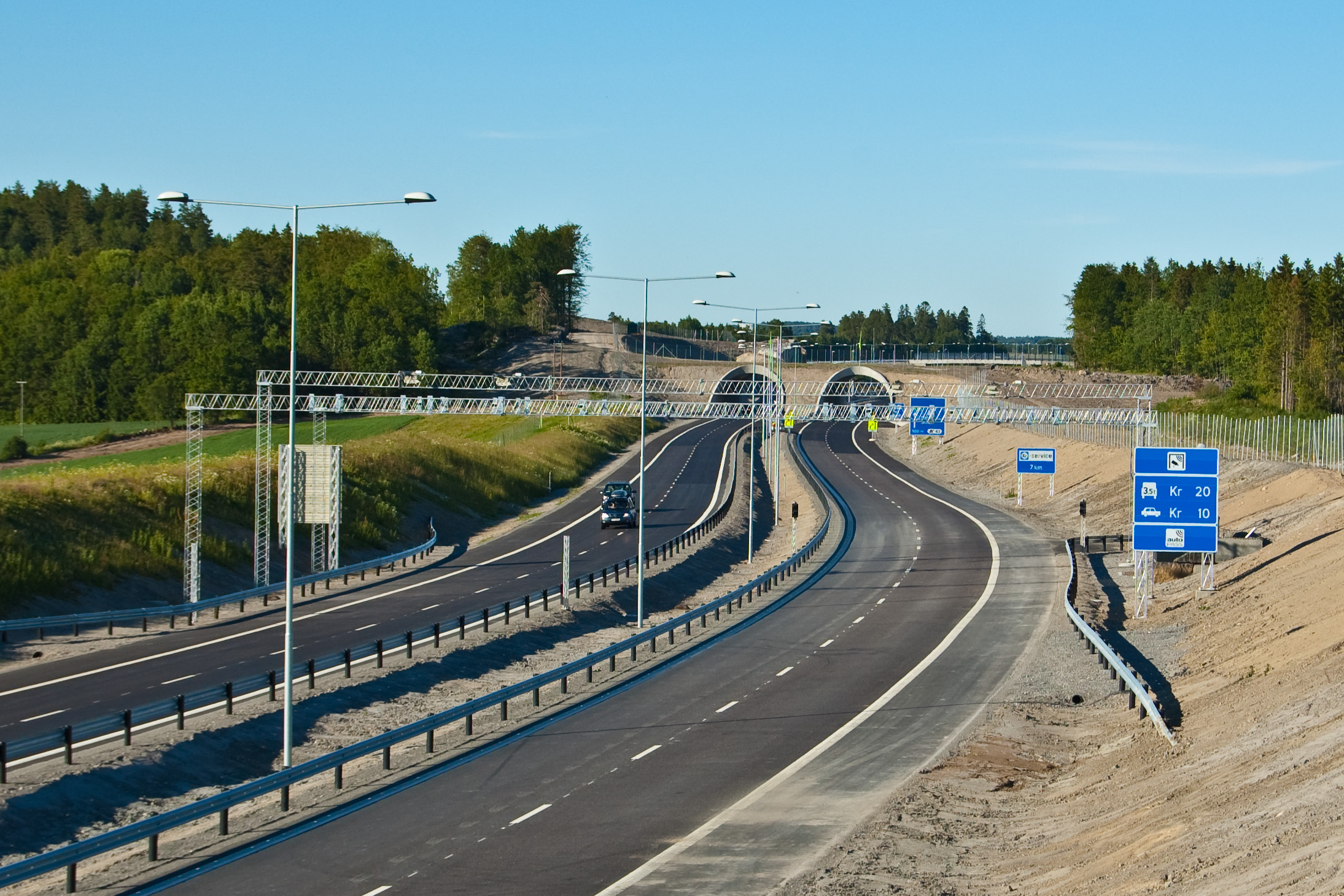
AutoPass Toll station on E18

== Public roads ==
Road		County	Toll road operator
E6	Svinesund Bridge, Østfold	Østfold	Svinesundsforbindelsen AS
E6	Moss, Raukerud, Østfoldpakka, Østfold	Østfold	Vegfinans Østfold Bompengeselskap AS
E6	Gardermoen-Biri, Akershus	Akershus	Vegfinans E6 Gardermoen-Moelv AS
E6	Øyer-Tretten, Tingberg, Oppland	Innlandet	Vegfinans E6 Oppland
E6	Frya-Sjoa, Oppland	Innlandet	Vegfinans Ringebu-Otta AS
E6	Trondheim–Stjørdal	Trøndelag	Vegamot AS
E6	Helgeland north: Korgen - Bolna	Nordland	BPS Nord - Nordland Bompengeselskap AS
E6	Helgeland south: Trøndelag county boundary-Korgfjellet; Kappskarmo-Brattåsen-Lien	Nordland	BPS Nord - Nordland Bompengeselskap AS
E6	Hålogaland Bridge	Nordland	BPS Nord - Hålogalandsbrua AS
E10	Trældal - Leirvik	Nordland	BPS Nord - Hålogalandsbrua AS
E16	Bolstad, Vossapakko, Hordaland	Vestland	Ferde AS
E16	Kongsvinger-Slomarka, Hedmark	Innlandet	Vegfinans E16 Kongsvingervegen AS
E16	Bagn-Bjørgo, Oppland	Innlandet	Vegfinans E16 Oppland AS
E18	Østfoldpakka, Østfold	Østfold	Vegfinans Østfold Bompengeselskap AS
E18	Gulli-Langangen, Vestfold	Vestfold	Vegfinans E18 Vestfold AS
E18	Rugtvedt- Dørdal, Telemark	Telemark	Vegfinans E18 Telemark AS
E18	Tvedestrand - Arendal	Agder	Ferde AS
E134	Damåsen–Saggrenda, Kongsberg	Buskerud	Vegfinans E134 Buskerud AS
Rv3 / Rv25	Løten-Elverum	Innlandet	Vegfinans AS
Rv4	Dynna, Lunner boundary, Oppland	Innlandet	Vegfinans Rv4 Oppland
Rv7	Sokna-Ørgenvika	Buskerud	Vegfinans Hallingporten AS
Rv13	Hardanger Bridge	Vestland	Ferde AS
Rv13	Svelgane, Vossapakko	Vestland	Ferde AS
Rv13	Ryfylke Tunnel, Ryfast	Rogaland	Ferde AS
Rv13	Hundvåg Tunnel, Ryfast	Rogaland	Ferde AS
Rv36	Slåttekås–Årnes, Ullevik	Telemark	Vegfinans Rv36 Telemark
Fv17	Dyrstad - Sprova	Trøndelag	Vegamot AS
Fv34	Grime-Vesleelva, Oppland	Innlandet	Vegfinans Fv34 Oppland
Fv49	Kvammapakken, Hordaland: Steinsdalen	Vestland	Ferde AS
Fv78	Toven Tunnel, Vefsn, Vegpakke Helgeland	Nordland	BPS Nord - Helgeland Veiutvikling AS
Fv79	Kvammapakken, Hordaland: Kjepsohøgda	Vestland	Ferde AS
Fv118	The old Svinesund Bridge, Østfold	Østfold	Svinesundsforbindelsen AS
Fv128	Old E18, Østfoldpakka	Østfold	Vegfinans Østfold Bompengeselskap AS
Fv175	Åsum, Kongsvinger-Slomarka, Hedmark	Innlandet	Vegfinans E16 Kongsvingervegen AS
Fv184	Part of Vegfinans E6 Gardermoen-Moelv project	Innlandet-Akershus	Vegfinans E6 Gardermoen-Moelv AS
Fv198	Fulu, Kongsvinger-Slomarka, Hedmark	Innlandet	Vegfinans E16 Kongsvingervegen AS
Fv255	Fåberg, Gausdalsvegen, Oppland	Innlandet	Vegfinans Gausdalsvegen AS
Fv286	Part of E134 Damåsen–Saggrendaproject	Buskerud	Vegfinans E134 Buskerud AS
Fv316	Kambo, Østfoldpakka	Østfold	Vegfinans Østfold Bompengeselskap AS
Fv450	Øvstabø, Gjesdal	Rogaland	Ferde AS
Fv519	Finnøy Tunnel, Rennesøy	Rogaland	Ferde AS
Fv542	Bømlo Bridge, Bømlopakken, Hordaland	Vestland	Ferde AS
Fv553	T-Link	Rogaland	Ferde AS
Fv714	Laksevegen	Trøndelag	Vegamot AS
Fv715	Krinsvatn, Fosenpakken	Trøndelag	Fosenvegene AS
Fv720	Strømnes - Malm	Trøndelag	Vegamot AS
Fv858	Rya Tunnel, Tromsø	Troms	Ryaforbindelsen AS
Fv2300	Dynna, Lunner boundary, Oppland	Innlandet	Vegfinans Rv4 Oppland AS
Fv2450	Bagn-Bjørgo, Oppland	Innlandet	Vegfinans E16 Oppland
Fv2522	Frya-Sjoa, Oppland	Innlandet	Vegfinans Ringebu-Otta AS
Fv2528	Jørstadmoen, Lundgård, Gausdalsvegen, Oppland	Innlandet	Vegfinans Gausdalsvegen AS

== Ferries collecting road tolls ==
The following ferry crossings collect road tolls as a surcharge to the ferry ticket:

Road	Crossing	County	Ferry operator	Toll road operator
E39	Mortavika–Arsvågen	Rogaland	Fjord1	
Fv541	Langevåg–Buavåg	Vestland	Norled	Ferde AS
Fv546	Husavik–Sandvikvåg	Vestland	Fjord1	Ferde AS
Fv546	Krokeide–Hufthamar	Vestland	Fjord1	Ferde AS
Fv710	Brekstad–Valset	Trøndelag	Fjord1	Fosenvegene AS
Fv715	Flakk–Rørvik	Trøndelag	ATB	Fosenvegene AS

Many crossings without toll charges also uses AutoPass as payment through the "AutoPass for ferry" concept. AutoPass customers with a valid agreement and tag, but without a separate ferry account gets a 10% discount in ferry crossings taking payment with the AutoPass tag. By making a prepayment into an Autopass ferry account, you get a 50% (40% corporate) discount for vehicle, and 17% for passengers at manual payment crossings.

== Former toll roads, tunnels and bridges ==
- Tønsberg Toll Ring
- Namsos Toll Ring
- E6 Grillstad–Værnes
- E6 Trondheim – Stjørdal
- E10/Fv82 Vesterål Bridges
- E16 Hadelandsvegen
- E16 Fønhus-Bagn
- E18 Buskerud
- E18 Vestfold Nord
- E18 Agder
- E39 Handeland, Listerpakken
- E39 Rennesøy Fixed Link
- E39 Triangle Link
- E39 Nordhordland Bridge
- E39 Øysand–Thamshavn
- E69 FATIMA-project
- E134 Oslofjord Tunnel
- E134 Stordal Tunnel, Etne
- E136 Tresfjord Bridge
- Rv4 Oppland
- Rv5 Berg Tunnel and Frudal Tunnel
- Rv5 Naustdal tunnel
- Rv9 Setesdal
- Rv13 Fatla tunnel
- Rv15 Måløy Bridge
- Rv19 Skoppum, Horten, Vestfold
- Rv80 Tverlandsbrua
- Rv658 Ålesund - Giske
- Fv17 Godøystraumen
- Fv33 Skreifjella - totenvika
- Fv43 Kollevoll, Listerpakken
- Fv49 Jondal Tunnel
- Fv49 Folgefonna tunnel
- Fv64 Skålavegen
- Fv64 Atlantic Ocean Road
- Fv108 Hvaler Tunnel
- Fv465 Gjervollstad, Listerpakken
- Fv500 Halsnøy Tunnel, Halsnøysambandet
- Fv562 Askøy Bridge
- Fv566 Osterøy Bridge
- Fv661 Straumsbrua
- Fv714 Sandstad (Hitra Tunnel, Frøya Tunnel and Fjellværøyforbindelsen)
- Fv755 Skarnsund Bridge
- Fv2522 Skarsmoen, (E6 Øyer-Tretten)
- Fv5236 Bjorøy Tunnel
- Fv5914 Sykkylven Bridge
- Fv5981 Skorgen and Sjegstad (old E136 before Tresfjord Bridge)

== See also ==
- Dedicated Short Range Communications
