= CzechToll =

Electronic toll collection co

- Company type: Private Limited company
- Headquarters: Prague, Czech Republic
- Revenue: 999,561,000 Czech koruna (2021)
- Operating income: 136,954,000 Czech koruna (2021)
- Net income: 110,046,000 Czech koruna (2021)
- Total assets: 2,360,503,000 Czech koruna (2021)
- Owner: PPF Group
- Number of employees: 52 (2021)
- Website: czechtoll.cz

CzechToll s.r.o. is a company that won a contract to provide toll collection on roads in the Czech Republic.

== History ==
CzechToll is a Czech private limited company, part of the PPF Group, with PPF a.s. holding 100% of its shares. CzechToll has been declared the winner of the tender to implement and operate a system for electronic toll collection in the Czech Republic from 2020 to 2030, alongside the Slovak company SkyToll a.s.

The Czech Transport Ministry’s tender was won by the consortium with a bid of CZK 10.7 billion. CzechToll's bid was CZK 2.7 billion less than the second most favoured bid from Kapsch, which has been operating the toll system in the Czech Republic since 2006. After signing the relevant agreements, CzechToll will be the electronic toll collection system operator in the Czech Republic. SkyToll is the guarantor for the construction and operation of the system within the consortium, and CzechToll has the role of strategic partner, which includes funding the project.

For PPF Group, the participation in the Czech electronic toll tender process was a strategic decision. This is borne out by success so far in a similar tender in Germany, where PPF, with SkyToll as a subcontractor responsible for technical aspects of the project, is now among the finalists bidding to collect tolls on 53,000 kilometres of roads and motorways.
