= Trondheim toll scheme =

Road toll scheme in Norway

Trondheim Toll Scheme or Trondheim Package (Norwegian: Trondheimspakken) was the result of that in the 1980s politicians and road authorities in Trondheim Municipality, Norway wanted to accelerate the investments in roads and motorways around the city through an investment package and toll scheme to ease construction and generate more funds. Between 1991 and 2005, there were more than 24 toll plazas throughout the city that helped financed the new roads. The cities Oslo and Bergen also introduced toll rings in the late 1980s and early 1990s, part of the history of toll roads in Norway.

== Project size ==
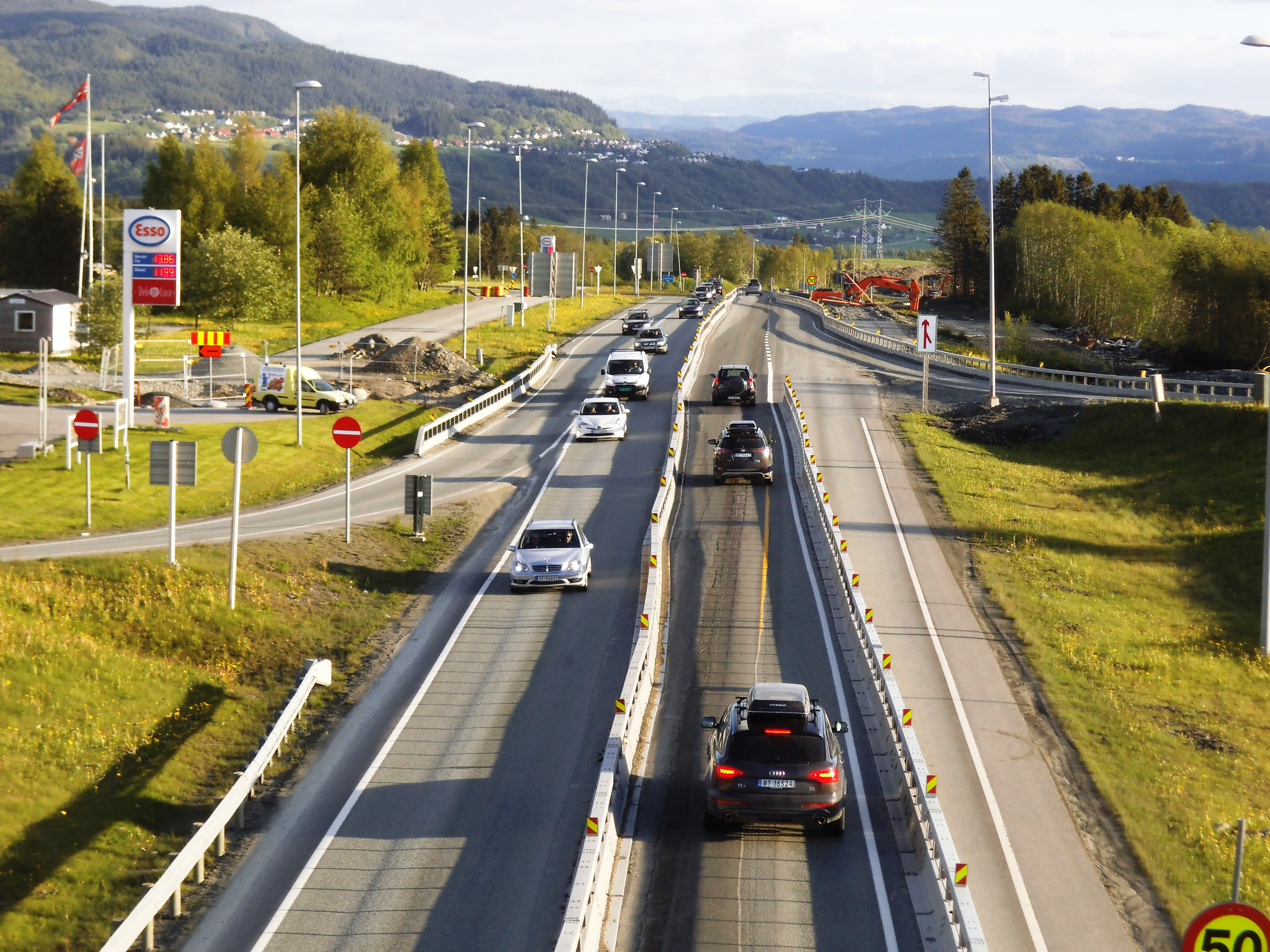
E6 highway in Trondheim

The system financed by the scheme includes a ring road around the city on European route E6, a new motorway east of the city to Stjørdal Municipality and Trondheim Airport, Værnes on E6, upgrades to E6 south of the city, including a new intersection at Sandmoen, a new Kroppan Bridge and a four-lane motorway between Klett and Melhus. As of 2007 a road from Ila via Brattøra to Lademoen, named Nordre Avlastningsvei, was under construction with plans to be finished in 2009 while an extension of E6 between the airport and to Kvithamar north of Stjørdal was in the start phase. Projects still not started at that time included putting Osloveien in Byåsen in a tunnel, a new Sluppen Bridge and a four-lane motorway between Tonstad to Klett. There was also a political consensus that some of the money generated by the system should be used to improve public transport in the city. Some environmental projects in the area also benefited from the toll income.

The toll collection was administrated by Trøndelag Veifinans. More than twenty toll booths were built, closing off all approaches to the city. It was impossible for anybody driving a car to get in for free weekdays between 6 am and 5 pm. The charge was NOK 15 for cars and 30 for trucks. The systems were designed to be user friendly through AutoPASS technology developed by the local company Q-Free, involving a radio-transmitted registration of passing cars, allowing cars to pass the toll booths at 60 km/h (but at most toll booths the speed limit was 50 km/h). The driver fits a small, plastic RFID device to the windscreen of the car, which communicates with the toll booth when the car passes through, and deducts money from the user's account. Those who (intentionally or by negligence) passed a toll booth without an operating toll device (or paying manually where possible) were subject to a fine. Motorists using a toll device were eligible for a toll discount.

The toll ring was not juridically considered a road pricing scheme, since the income from the tolls goes to road infrastructure. To be considered a road pricing scheme in accordance to Norwegian law, the scheme must be organised such as to charge most when the congestion is largest, i.e. in rush hour. Secondly, a road pricing scheme cannot primarily finance road investments, but must go either to public transport subsidies or to infrastructure for public transport and pedestrians and bicycles.

The system was initially introduced to fund the building of new ring roads so that the heaviest traffic would not have to pass through the city centre. Part of the reason for this traffic is due to Trondheim Port being located on an artificial island only accessible via the city centre and Trondheim has yet to move its port out of the city centre, like the London Docklands and Fjordbyen in Oslo. There are ongoing discussions on whether the port should be moved from its current location. The lack of a bypass outside the residential areas, along with less than optimal railroad capacity, contributes heavily to road congestion through Trondheim Municipality.

== Criticism ==
The initial reaction to the toll system in Trondheim was mixed. Some daily commuters felt the extra cost was unjustifiable, but most drivers were quite happy to pay in order to get some of the heaviest traffic out of the city centre. Ten years on, most drivers in and around Trondheim do not give the toll system a second thought. They have become used to it over time, and the system was also cleverly designed to be extremely user-friendly.

The initial development of the project came at the same time as the municipal council of Trondheim Municipality decided to close the Trondheim Tramway in 1988, with arguments that diesel buses are cheaper to operate. Trondheim has a notoriously low public transport ridership, at 11% of the total transport trips using public transport, compared to almost 50% in Oslo. Part of this is credited the low frequency and high time costs of using public transport in Trondheim, partially due to high investments in road infrastructure compared to public transport infrastructure.

After the toll ring was closed in 2005, some politicians, environmental advocates and others suggested reintroducing the toll ring. Some wanted to use the funds to complete the Trondheim Package, and others wanted to use it to reduce traffic congestion and use the funds for public transport subsidies.

== See also ==
- Bergen Program
