= MagCom =

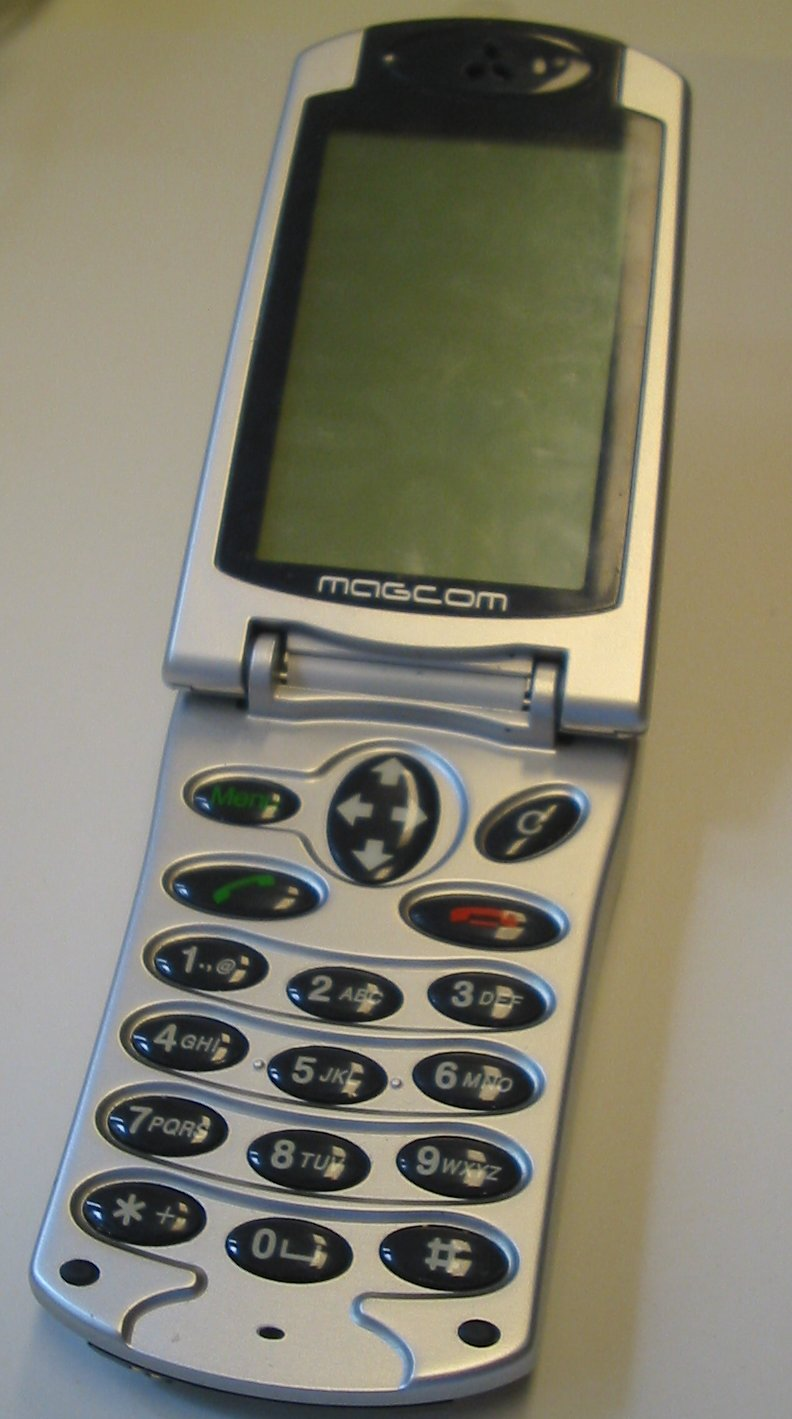
MagCom mobile phone

MagCom was a Norwegian manufacturer of cellular GSM handsets. The company, located in Oslo, was founded in 1999. In its various phases, around 200 million NOK were invested in the company. Insight Capital Partners, Telenor Venture and Anders Wilhelmsen AS were the largest investors. The company's single product was the triple band MagCom cellular phone, on sale from April 2001.

== Overview ==
In the months before the phone became available for purchase, most of the major IT-related media were ecstatic about the new phone, extensively hyping it. Some publications even claiming it would revolutionize the industry. When the phone finally became available for sale, it had already been delayed. Due to this, expectations had grown even higher, and much was expected in terms of functionality and technology.

== Features ==
When the phone was launched, it had features that at the time were quite sophisticated:

- Large black and white LCD screen with 64000 pixels, giving room for 27 lines of text
- Email (SMTP and POP3)
- User upgradable software
- Web browser with HTML support
- Automatic clock adjustment over Network Time Protocol (NTP)
- Full calendar, appointment and address book, that could be synchronized with Microsoft Outlook

One of the features promoted, was that the magnesium material used for the casing, as well as the form factor, resulted in an exceptionally low specific absorption rate (SAR) for the handset. The value of 0.043 W/kg was rather significantly lower than the legal limit at the time, 2.0 in Europe and 1.6 in the US. In the initial software release, the browser supported HTML pages, but not WAP. Later upgrades of the support did include support for WAP pages.

Although several software updates were released, sales remained low, resulting in financial problems for the company. Even releasing information about an upcoming new and improved model failed to help the company secure additional financial support. The production was halted early in August 2001, and the company was bought by the Norwegian company Q-Free in September 2001. The company was from then on named Q-Free MagCom, and continued as a separate entity for around a year, after which the production of phones ceased.
