= Kapsch CarrierCom AG =

- Industry: IT
- Founded: 2002
- Headquarters: Vienna, Austria
- Key people: Kari Kapsch (CEO); Thomas Schöpf (COO); Michael Kleinhagauer (CTO)
- Products: Network systems integration
- Revenue: 170,2 Mio. EUR (Fiscal Year 2013/14)
- Number of employees: 740 (Fiscal Year 2013/14)

Kapsch CarrierCom is a multinational system integrator and telecommunications solutions provider for various sectors, including public and railway operators, urban transport organizations, and companies. The company generated a total revenue of €170,2 million as of March 2014 with 740 employees worldwide. The headquarters are located in Vienna, Austria and has subsidiaries in more than 20 countries around the globe. The management board consists of Kari Kapsch (CEO), Thomas Schöpf (COO) and Michael Kleinhagauer (CTO).

== Milestones ==
- 1982: Kapsch CarrierCom is established as Austria Telecommunication by Kapsch and Schrack and becomes a leading supplier for telecommunication solutions.
- 1989: Kapsch opens up new subsidiaries in the Czech Republic, Hungary, Poland and Slovakia, among others.
- 1995: Kapsch purchases Ericsson-Schrack’s fifty percent stake of Austria Telecommunication.
- 2002: Austria Telecommunication is renamed Kapsch CarrierCom and becomes part of the Kapsch Group.
- 2005 – 2008: Establishment of subsidiaries in Croatia, Bulgaria, Serbia, Slovenia, Belarus and Macedonia.
- 2009: Expansion through acquisitions of TIS Kis d.o.o. and Ring Datacom d.o.o. in Croatia.
- 2010: Acquisition of parts of the Carrier Networks Division of Nortel including the GSM technology for EMEA and Taiwan and the GSM-R technology for the global market.
- 2011: Kapsch CarrierCom executes the first GSM-R call in Africa over a 1,000 km distance and migrates a major telecom provider’s fixed network to next-generation VoIP technology.
- 2012: More than 70,000 track-kilometers are covered with Kapsch CarrierCom‘s GSM-R technology.

== Business segments ==
Kapsch CarrierCom offers solutions for four different business segments:

Public Operators
Products and end-to-end OSS/BSS systems, next generation services and applications, delivery platforms and mediation, core network solutions, as well as access and transmission solutions

Railways
Leading supplier of end-to-end railway telecommunications solutions, from GSM-R core and access networks to terminals such as cab radios and the full professional services spectrum

Public Transport
Critical communication solutions for urban public transport, based on the TETRA (Terrestrial Trunked Radio) technology

Machine Networks
Intelligent asset management solutions through Machine-to-Machine communications
