= Q-Free =

Norwegian transport technology company

- Type: Private
- Industry: Intelligent Transportation Systems
- Founded: 1984
- Headquarters: Trondheim, Norway
- Area served: Worldwide
- Key people: Mark Talbot (CEO), Silje Troseth (VP APAC), Whitney Nottage (VP North America)
- Products: Electronic Toll Collection; Multi-Lane Free Flow (MLFF)Kinetic Mobility; Intrada ALPR; Velocity; MAXTIME; Dynamic Software; Weigh-in-Motion (WIM)
- Number of employees: approximately 350 employees
- Website: www.q-free.com

Q-Free AS (Q-Free) is a Norwegian technology company headquartered in Trondheim, Norway, specializing in intelligent transportation systems (ITS). Founded in 1984, the company develops hardware and software solutions for elctronic toll collection, traffic management, traffic signal control, and road user charging. Q-Free operates internationally, serving transportation authorities and infrastructure operators worldwide.

Formerly listed on the Oslo Stock Exchange, the company became privately held in 2023 following its acquisition by Guardian Smart Infrastructure Management and Rieber & Søn.

== History ==
=== Founding and early development (1984-2002) ===
Q-Free was founded in Trondheim, Norway in 1984 under the name Micro Design AS. The company initially developed electronic toll collection (ETC) technology, including systems that allowed vehicles to pass through tolling points without stopping.

Q-Free electronic toll collection technology was installed in Trondheim and two years later in Oslo, the two systems being the predecessor to the present AutoPASS technology in Norway. The company's first international delivery came in 1995, to Portugal and in 1997, the European standard for electronic toll collection was introduced.

During the 1990s, the company expanded internationally, including deliveries to Portugal, and in 1997, the European standard for electronic toll collection was introduced.

In September 2001, Q-Free bought the cellphone manufacturer MagCom. The new company, named Q-Free MagCom, continued as a separate entity for around a year, after which the production of phones ceased.

The company adopted the name Q-Free in 1988 and was listed on the Oslo Stock Exchange in 2002 under the ticker symbol QFR.

=== International expansion (2002-2011) ===
During the 2000s, Q-Free further expanded its electronic toll collection operations internationally, participating in tolling and congestion charging projects in Europe, Australia, and other markets.

The company also expanded its vehicle identification capabilities through the acquisition of Dacolian, a Netherlands-based company specializing in automatic license plate recognition (ALPR) technology.

=== Diversification (2012-2015) ===
Beginning in 2012, Q-Free undertook a series of acquisitions intended to diversify its operations beyond electronic toll collection into advanced traffic management systems (ATMS).

In December 2012, Q-Free acquired TCS International, a United States-based provider of parking guidance and management systems. The acquisition marked an expansion into parking technology.

In 2013, Q-Free acquired Serbian traffic management company ELCOM and made an initial minority investment in Intelight, a Tucson, Arizona-based manufacturer of traffic signal controllers, cabinets, and traffic management software.

The company continued expanding in 2014 with the acquisition of TDC Systems, a British supplier of traffic monitoring and detection technology, including weigh-in-motion, and Traffic Design, a Slovenian provider of traffic management and tolling systems.

In September 2014, Q-Free completed the acquisition of Open Roads Consulting, a Virginia-based provider of advanced traffic management software and systems integration services. Open Roads developed OpenTMS, a software platform for managing highway and interstate transportation infrastructure.

In 2015, Q-Free acquired Traffiko and entered an agreement to progressively increase its ownership of Intelight over a five-year period.

These transactions broadened the company's activities to include traffic signal control, traffic monitoring, advanced traffic management software, parking systems, and related transportation technologies.

=== Consolidation and divestitures (2016-2022) ===
Following its acquisition-driven expansion, Q-Free consolidated parts of its operations and continued developing its tolling and traffic management business.

In 2018, the company reported restructuring activities that including closing operations with ELCOM and Traffiko.

Q-Free completed its acquisition of Intelight in 2020, obtaining full ownership of the company.

In March 2021, Q-Free divested its parking division, which originated with the acquisition of TCS International. The business was sold to parking division executive Dave Radford and continued operating under the TCS International name. The divesture reflected Q-Free's decision to concentrate operations on tolling and traffic management.

=== Change in ownership (2023-present) ===
In 2023, Guardian Smart Infrastructure Management and Rieber & Søn pursued the acquisition of Q-Free through the jointly owned company Juniper Holdco AS.

Following the transaction, Q-Free was delisted from the Oslo Stock Exchange in December 2023, ending more than two decades as a publicly traded company.

Q-Free subsequently continued operations as a privately held provider of tolling and traffic management technologies.
