= Kapsch =

International corporation in Vienna, Austria

Kapsch AG
- Industry: IT
- Founded: 1892
- Founder: Johann Kapsch
- Headquarters: Vienna, Austria
- Key people: Georg Kapsch (CEO); Kari Kapsch (COO); Franz Semmernegg (CFO)
- Products: Tolling Systems, IT-Data Networks, IT-System-Integrations
- Revenue: 553.4 EUR (FY 2022/23)
- Number of employees: 6,673 (FY 2019/20)
- Website: www.kapsch.net

The Kapsch Group, headquartered in Vienna, Austria, is an international corporation specializing in telematics, information technology and telecommunication.

== History and operations ==
In September 1892, Johann Kapsch (1845–1921) founded a precision engineering workshop in Vienna, with the state-owned and operated Post- und Telegraphenverwaltung (Mailing- and Telegraph-Administration) among its first clients. In 1916, the company changed its name to Telefon- und Telegrafen-Fabriks-Aktiengesellschaft Kapsch & Söhne in Wien ("Telephone and Telegraph Manufacturing Stock Company Kapsch & Sons in Vienna"). During World War I, the company produced night sights for the Austrian Model 1895 rifle and carbine. With the growing number of inventions, Kapsch expanded its product range by adding the manufacturing of capacitors, tin tubes and dry batteries. In 1923, Kapsch started to manufacture radios, with the first TV sets following in 1955. After the Second World War, Kapsch was heavily involved in rebuilding the Austrian telephone network.

In 1978, the company focused on digital communications systems. This was followed by the entry into the mobile phones market in 1985. That same year, Kapsch was involved in the introduction of the digital telephone infrastructure in Austria and Hungary.

Between 1989 and 1999, the company founded international subsidiaries and representations in Hungary, Czech Republic, Poland, Slovakia, Ukraine, Russia, Slovenia, and Croatia.

In 1994, Europe's trains were equipped with train radio systems by Kapsch. In 1995, Austria's EcoPoint System was implemented.

In 2000, the company acquired traffic control technology from Bosch and Saab and founded subsidiaries and interests in Asia, Australia, South America and South Africa, followed by the acquisition of Schrack BusinessCom a year later.

In 2002, the Kapsch Group was into three business areas, namely Kapsch BusinessCom AG, Kapsch CarrierCom AG and Kapsch TrafficCom AG. The latter implements the electronic toll collection system based on microwave technology in Austria in 2003. A year later, the commercial operation of Austria's nationwide truck tolling system was going operational and new representative offices in China and a branch office in Croatia are founded.

In 2005, the Kapsch Telematic Services GmbH was founded with branch offices in Czech Republic and Hungary.

In 2006, Kapsch TrafficCom AG implemented a toll system in Czech Republic. Three years later, the firm was awarded the implementation of the Gauteng tolling project in South Africa and implemented a toll system in Republic of Belarus in 2013.

In 2014, Kapsch TrafficCom acquired Advanced Traffic Management Software (ATMS) provider Transdyn. That same year, Kapsch CarrierCom acquired Prodata Mobility Systems NV.

In fiscal year 2014/15, the Kapsch corporate group generated a total revenue of €908.8 million, with more than 5,700 employees worldwide.

In 2015, Kapsch CarrierCom acquired a controlling stake in Streetline, Inc., a provider of smart parking solutions based in California. Also in 2015, the company bought the transport business Schneider Electric Industries, advised by Conquest Advisory.

In 2017, Kapsch TrafficCom acquired a controlling stake in Fluidtime Data Services GmbH, an Austrian IT company for Integrated Mobility and Mobility-as-a-Service.

In the fiscal year 2019/20, the company generated a turnover of €1,137.9 million.

=== Allegations of irregular payments to South African and Zambian politicians ===
In 2019, Kapsch, and its South African operation, Electronic Toll Collection Pty, were accused of paying kickbacks to a South African company, "ProAsh". The payments were revealed by the former CEO of the Electronic Toll Collection, who subsequently testified to The Judicial Commission of Inquiry into Allegations of State Capture. An investigation was promised by the Minister of Transport, Fikile Mbalula, but had not led to action as of February 2021. Kapsch was also accused of using the Electronic Toll Collection Pty to launder bribes for Zambian politicians.

== Group organisation ==
=== Kapsch BusinessCom AG (KBC) ===
In 2001, Kapsch AG bought the majority of former Schrack BusinessCom AG, which was subsequently merged with the Kapsch Enterprise division. As a result of this merger Kapsch BusinessCom AG was founded and expanded its activities and outreach throughout Central Europe. Today, the company has subsidiaries in the Czech Republic, Slovakia, Hungary, Romania, Turkey and Poland.

The company is a regional reseller and integration partner to technology companies in the IT, network and telecommunications sector: Cisco Gold Certified Partner, Microsoft Gold Partner, Aastra Training Provider.

Kapsch BusinessCom AG produces the Card Reader and GINA Box for the Austrian e-Card system, which is placed in doctors’ offices.

=== Kapsch TrafficCom AG (KTC) ===
Kapsch TrafficCom AG is an international supplier of "intelligent road traffic telematic solutions". The company develops and sells products, systems and services primarily for electronic toll collection (ETC) systems and specializes in solutions for open road tolling (ORT), multi-lane free-flow (MLFF) and high occupancy tolling (HOT).

In addition, the company supplies traffic management systems, with a focus on road safety and traffic control, and electronic access systems and parking management.

The company, with headquarters in Vienna, has subsidiaries and interests in 23 countries. The company had performed 210 installations in 35 countries (as of March/2009) in Europe, Australia, North America, Latin America, Middle East, Asia Pacific and in South Africa, and about 13 million on-board units (OBUs) and over 11,300 equipped lanes.

Kapsch TrafficCom AG built the Austrian Truck Tolling System, which went on stream in 2004.

Since 2004, the company has established subsidiaries in Moscow, Russia and Slovenia and has entered into a joint venture agreement with Busi Impianti S.p.A., Italy, creating Kapsch-Busi S.p.A.

In 2014, Kapsch acquired Atlanta-based Transdyn Inc from Powell Industries, establishing Kapsch TrafficCom NA in the United States.

Since June 26, 2007, 30.3% of Kapsch TrafficCom AG has been listed in the Prime Market on the Vienna Stock Exchange. Kapsch Group Beteiligungs GmbH retains possession of 69.7%. Overall 2.2 million new and 1.16 million old shares were brought to the market. The IPO was 14 times over-subscribed. In the fiscal year 2019/20, Kapsch TrafficCom AG generated a turnover of €731.2 million.
