= BroBizz =

Danish toll collection system

BroBizz A/S
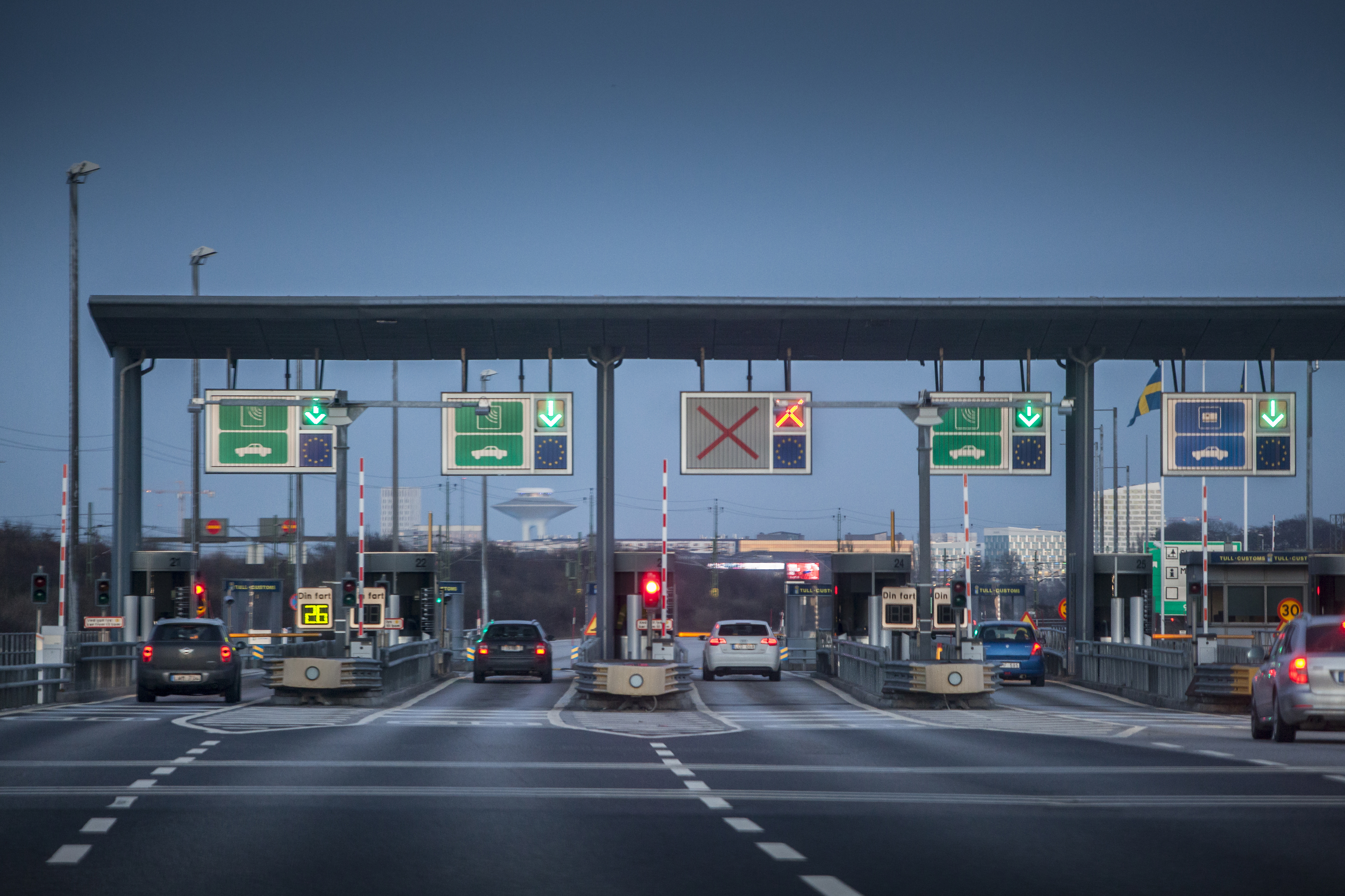
- Toll collection area at the Øresund Bridge (BroBizz in green lanes)
- Founded: 1 November 2008
- Headquarters: Copenhagen, Denmark
- Owner: Sund & Bælt Holding A/S

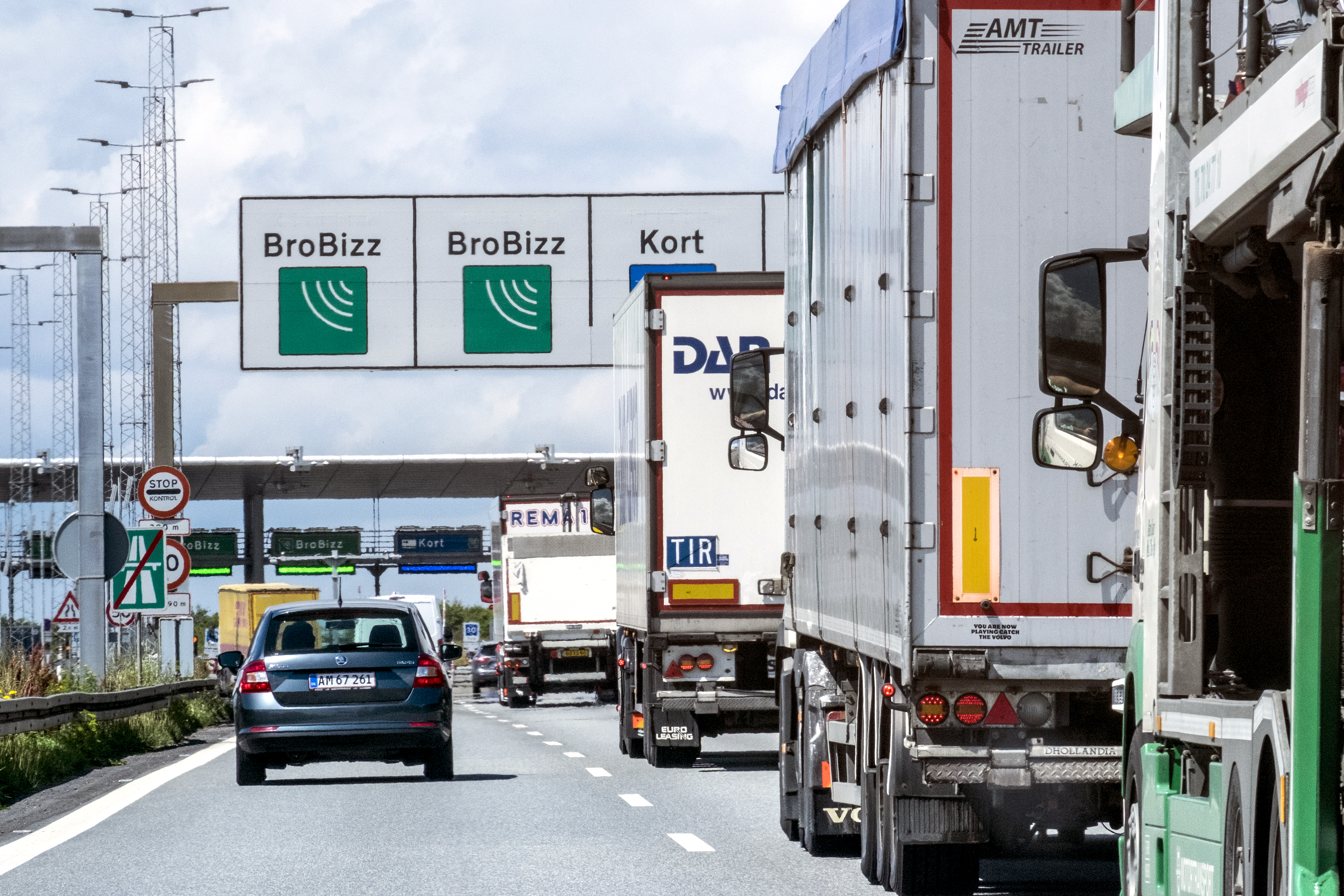
Signs indicating lanes for passing using BroBizz

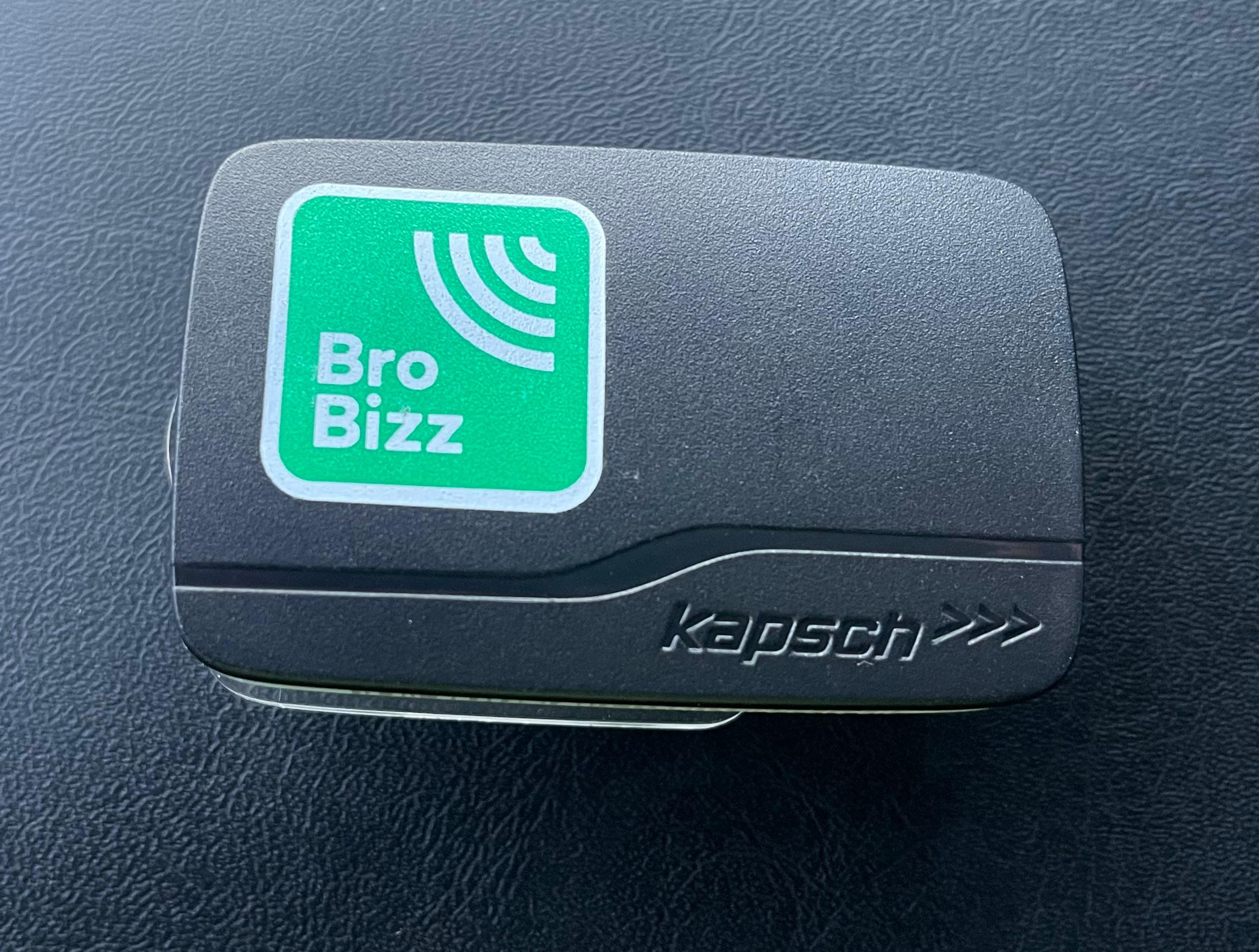
Brobizz transmitter for payment

BroBizz is an electronic toll collection system run by the company BroBizz A/S. It originated in Denmark and was established in 2008. The system operates using a wireless transmitter, enabling drivers to pass through tollbooths without stopping. It has been implemented on frequented traffic links such as the Great Belt Fixed Link and the Øresund Bridge. Additionally, BroBizz is accepted for payment on various ferries, toll roads, airport car parks, and parking facilities across multiple Scandinavian cities.

As part of the EasyGo network, BroBizz can also be used for payment on Norwegian toll roads that support the AutoPass system.

BroBizz A/S is registered as a European Electronic Toll Service (EETS) issuer.

== PayByPlate ==
BroBizz A/S introduced automatic number-plate recognition on 21 March 2018. With PayByPlate, it is possible to use a number plate as identification. Initially, this service could only be used on the Great Belt Bridge. As of 2026 PayByPlate works only with Danish and Swedish number plates.

== See also ==
- AutoPASS
- EasyGo
