= Autopass =

Norwegian toll collection system

Old autoPASS logo

Road sign 792.30 indicates an automatic toll station. According to the latest template on road signage in automatic toll stations, this sign shall be posted on the toll station, and the only sign posted before passing the station itself is a "Kr" symbol added to the direction signs on roads leading to the toll station.

The "Kr" symbol, road sign 765, is added on the direction signs on roads leading to toll stations. This is the only sign posted before the station itself except in city areas where a new 560-zone sign is posted on city limits.

Autopass (stylized as autoPASS) is a Norwegian electronic toll collection system. It allows collecting road tolls automatically from cars. It uses electronic radio transmitters and receivers operating at 5.8 GHz (MD5885) originally supplied by the Norwegian companies Q-Free and Fenrits. Since 2013, Kapsch and Norbit supplied the transponders. In 2016, the Norwegian Public Roads Administration revealed that they had chosen Norbit and Q-Free as suppliers of Autopass-transponders for the next four years.

Contracts with vehicle owners are made with private competing companies beginning in 2022. Autopass, as a national company, only handles the technology. A contract, in general, gives a 20% discount for lightweight vehicles. Contracts and tags are compulsory for heavy vehicles. Foreign registered vehicles without a contract are handled by the EPASS24 company, which will track the owner and bill them. Owners are advised to register their vehicle with EPASS24 and pay to avoid extra costs. This includes foreign borrowed or rented vehicles. Customers with Norwegian rental vehicles can't make their contract with any AutoPASS provider but have to wait for the rental company to get the toll bill and charge the customer afterwards. Tolls are normally VAT-free because legally only the owner is responsible for tolls. The exception is rental cars, as charging the rental customer is legally seen as an extra rental fee.

Toll rings have generally used the "hour rule" since 2022, meaning that only one passage per hour is charged if the owner has a contract. Especially in Oslo and Tromsø, which have multiple ring roads, driving without a contract can be multiple times the cost compared to having a contract. Electric vehicles have a large discount, usually half price, in addition to the general 20% discount contract, but only if having a contract.

In 2022, AutoPASS left the EasyGo partnership, which means the AutoPASS tag is no longer valid in Denmark and Sweden unless the contract provider has such a validity.

In 2019, more and more ferry crossings have also been using Autopass as a payment option through the "Autopass for Ferry" concept. A few crossings are automatic, but most are still manual. Autopass tag holders may only pay for the vehicle at fully automatic crossings with a 10% discount. Those with a prepaid Autopass ferry account get a 50% (40% corporate) discount for vehicles and 17% for passengers at manual payment crossings. See https://www.autopassferje.no for more information.

== Technology ==
The road sign indicating an automatic toll collection lane in toll stations that are not automatic. Most toll stations are automatic and use the signs above.

The system involves installing a DSRC-based radio transponder on a vehicle's windscreen and signing an agreement with one of the toll collection companies in Norway. Tolls are charged at toll plazas, and cars can drive over 100 kilometres per hour (62 mph). The system is administrated by the Norwegian Public Roads Administration. All public toll roads now use the electronic toll collection system.

Each Autopass unit contains a microcontroller which will process requests from the roadside and respond with the proper information to the roadside.

There are five generations of cryptographic key pairs inside each Autopass unit, which are unique for each unit. The cryptographic keys are used to authenticate the unit when passing a toll plaza, making it difficult to make fraudulent copies of an Autopass unit. Unlike similar DSRC-based tolling systems in many countries, the Norwegian system has no access control. However, the unique ID within the unit is available for those with the proper DSRC equipment.

There is an internal storage space for 100 log entries, which are normally updated each time a vehicle owner is charged when passing a toll plaza. This is a collection of receipt entries that includes the time, date, and station identity of the toll plaza that did the tolling transaction.

Each Autopass unit features a move detection mechanism. When the unit is removed from the windscreen, an electrical switch will be activated, causing a flag to be set in a processor within the Autopass unit. This flag will be registered when doing a tolling transaction the next time the unit passes a toll plaza.

== Obligatory tag for heavy vehicles ==
As of 1 January 2015, it is compulsory for all vehicles over 3.5 tonnes (3.4 long tons; 3.9 short tons) registered to an enterprise, state, county, or municipal administration or which are otherwise primarily used for business purposes to have an electronic toll payment tag when driving in Norway. The provision has its legal basis in regulations adopted on 10 October 2014. It applies to all Norwegian and foreign vehicles that meet the criteria on the entire public road network. Failure to carry a toll payment tag will result in a fine of 8,000 NOK. Failure to pay within three weeks increases the penalty charge to 12,000 NOK. Failure to comply twice within two years results in a fine of 16,000 NOK.

== See also ==
- Toll roads in Norway
- Dedicated Short Range Communications
