= EasyGo =

European electronic toll tag for vehicles

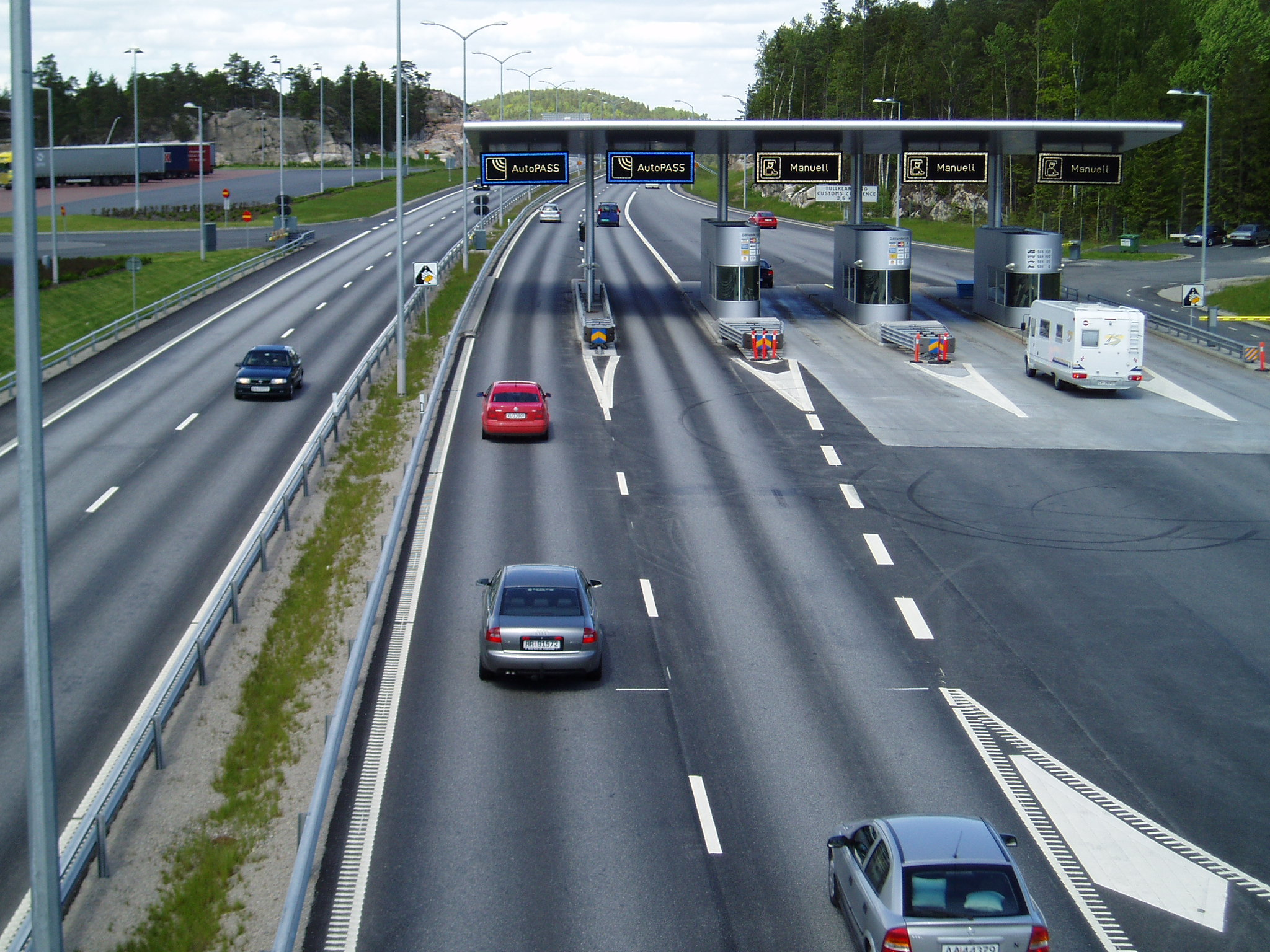
Toll collection area at Svinesund (AutoPASS in blue lanes)

EasyGo is a joint venture between Norway, Sweden, Denmark and Austria, that enables use of a single electronic toll tag on toll roads, ferries and bridges in all the member countries. The purpose of EasyGo is to enable the use of one OBE for payment when driving through any toll facility one might encounter on the way through Northern Europe and Austria.

EasyGo is based on DSRC 5.8 GHz microwave technology and there are major differences between the operators. The toll stations have different design and there is no common EasyGo signage, although there are some common features.

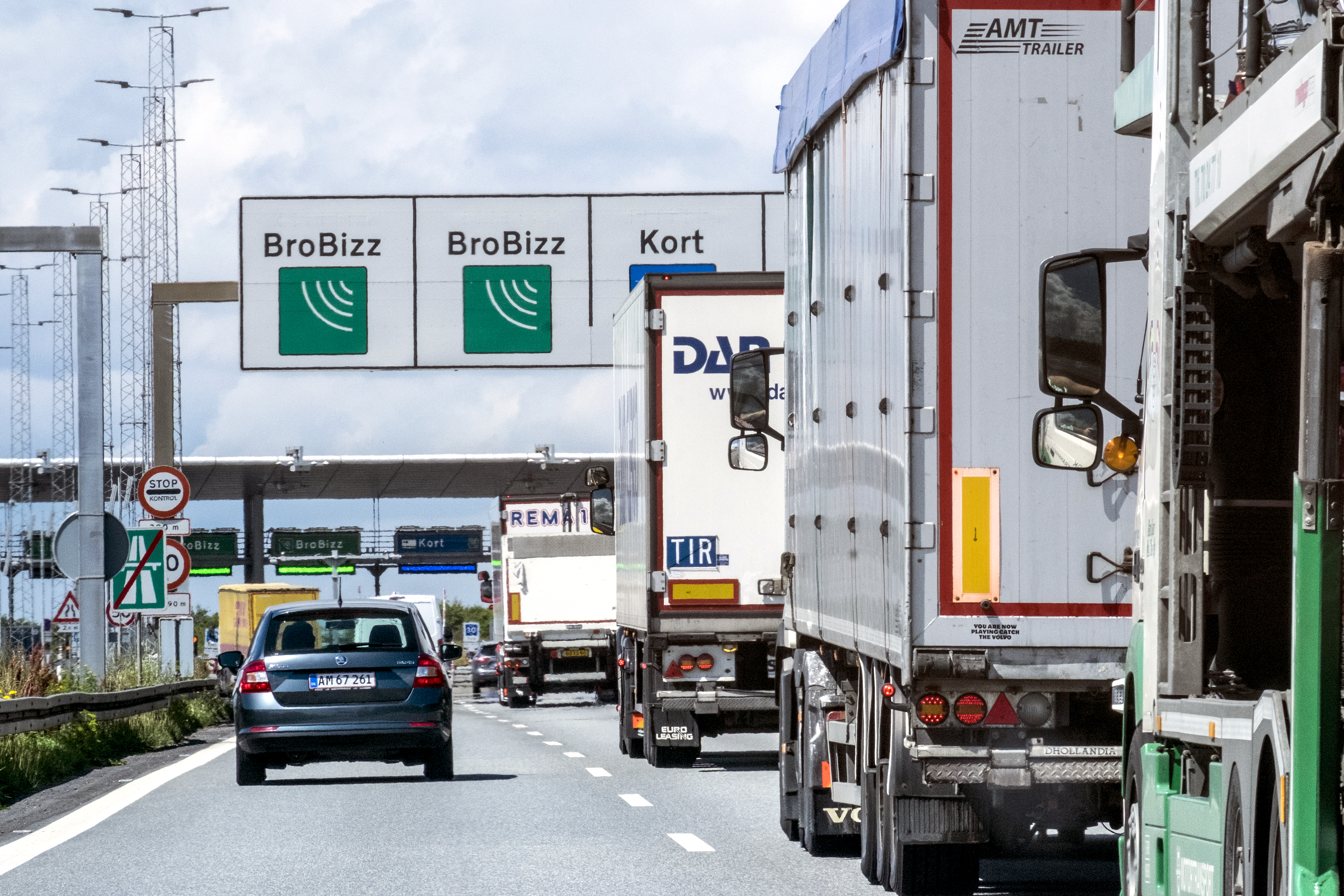
Toll collection area at the Great Belt Bridge (BroBizz in green lanes)

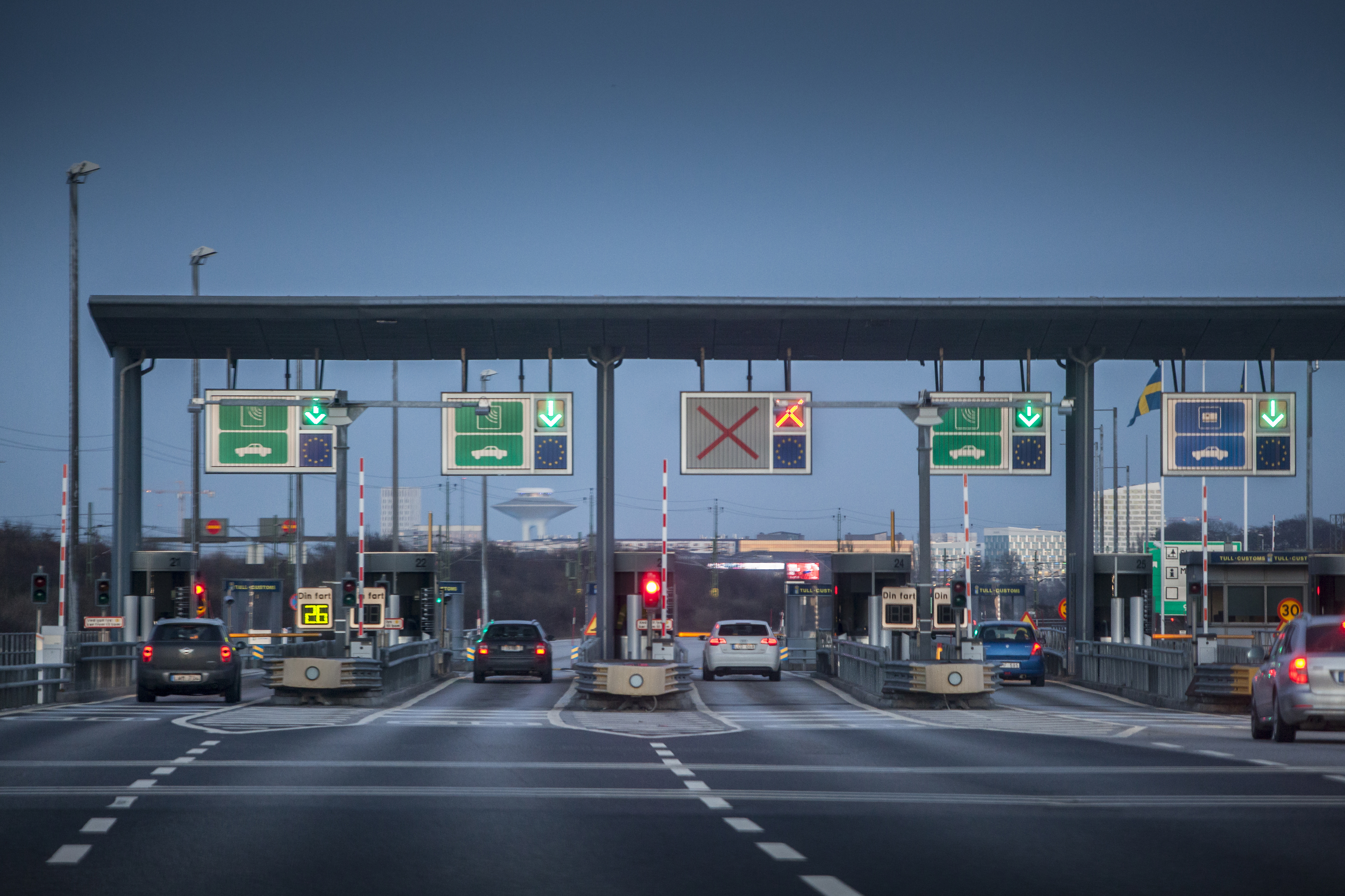
Toll collection area at the Øresund Bridge (BroBizz in green lanes)

== History ==
EasyGo was Europe's first commercial cross-border toll collection service. Initial discussions began in 2004, when the Svinesund Bridge between Norway and Sweden was being built. The Norwegian Public Roads Administration and the Swedish Transport Agency, together with Sund & Bælt (operator of the Great Belt Fixed Link) and Øresundsbro Konsortiet (Danish/Swedish joint venture, operator of the Øresund Bridge), established EasyGo in 2007.

Austrian ASFiNAG joined the partnership in 2009.

All existing systems implemented in the Nordic countries by 2007 (AutoPASS and BroBizz) are included, and no revision of the laws in the countries was required. EasyGo countries have four different currencies and variable VAT levels.

From 1 January 2021, OBE's must be issued by EETS-registered providers in order to be used at the Great Belt Fixed Link. Few of the Norwegian AutoPass providers were EETS providers, and most AutoPASS consequently could not be used at Storebælt. The Norwegian AutoPass providers SkyttelPASS, Flyt and Fremtind Service have since been EETS-registered.

In December 2021, the Norwegian Public Roads Administration withdrew from EasyGo starting a transition period until 31 March 2022. AutoPASS providers need to be EETS-registered and approved by the operators in order for the OBE to be valid in those toll facilities after the transition period ends.

== EasyGo Basic ==
The EasyGo Basic service is for vehicles only travelling in Scandinavia or has a maximum allowable weight of 3.5 tons.

== EasyGo+ ==
EasyGo+ is a cross-border toll collection service, allowing drivers of vehicles over 3.5 tons to pay tolls in Austria, Denmark, Sweden and Norway, using only one OBE in all four countries.

== Service providers ==
There are several Service providers that offer the EasyGo services. However, some Service Providers only supply OBEs for one of the services. For an OBE to be valid in a toll domain, an agreement between the Service Provider and the Toll Domain/Toll Charger is required.

Service Provider	Issued in	Valid in
AS24	France	AustriaDenmarkSweden
Axxès	France	AustriaDenmarkSweden
BroBizz A/S	Denmark	AustriaDenmarkSweden
DKV Euro Service GmbH & Co KG	Germany	AustriaDenmarkSweden
Eurotoll SAS	France	AustriaDenmarkSweden
Fremtind Service AS	Norway	DenmarkSweden
Toll4Europe GmbH	Germany	Austria
ØresundPay	Sweden	DenmarkSweden
SkyttelPASS AS	Norway	DenmarkSweden
TELEPASS SPA	Italy	AustriaDenmarkSweden
Tolltickets GmbH	Germany	AustriaSweden
W.A.G payment solutions, a.s.	Switzerland	Austria
Flyt AS	Norway	DenmarkSweden

== See also ==
- AutoPASS
- Road pricing
- Toll road
- Statens vegvesen
- Swedish Transport Agency
- Scandlines
