= List of toll bridges =

The following is a list of toll bridges. Toll bridges are bridges upon which traffic may pass upon payment of a fee, or a toll. This list is intended to be a subset of List of toll roads.

== Australia ==
- West Gate Bridge, Melbourne
- Sydney Harbour Bridge, Sydney
- Gateway Bridge, Brisbane
- Go Between Bridge, Brisbane

== Austria ==
- Europa Bridge, A13 Brenner Autobahn (European route E45), just south of Innsbruck, Tyrol

== Bulgaria–Romania border ==
- Danube Bridge
- New Europe Bridge 0-37 euro

== Canada ==
=== Ontario ===
- Ambassador Bridge
- Blue Water Bridge
- Fort Frances–International Falls International Bridge
- Gordie Howe International Bridge
- International Bridge
- Lewiston–Queenston Bridge
- Ogdensburg–Prescott International Bridge
- Peace Bridge
- Rainbow Bridge
- Seaway International Bridge
- Thousand Islands Bridge
- Whirlpool Rapids Bridge

=== Prince Edward Island/New Brunswick ===
- Confederation Bridge $20.00 CAD

=== Quebec ===
- Olivier-Charbonneau Bridge $1.80-$2.40 CAD with transponder, $6.80–$7.40 CAD with video
- Serge Marcil Bridge $1.50 CAD

=== Former ===
==== Nova Scotia ====
- Angus L. Macdonald Bridge - tolls eliminated on March 14, 2025
- A. Murray MacKay Bridge - tolls eliminated on March 14, 2025

== Denmark ==
- Øresund Bridge - connecting the Danish island of Zealand with Sweden 54 Euros
- Great Belt Bridge
- Crown Princess Mary’s Bridge - The Frederikssund Connection

== France ==
- Millau Viaduct - over the Tarn, north of Montpellier

== Greece ==
- Rio–Antirrio Bridge - over the Gulf of Corinth, north of Patras.

== Hong Kong ==
=== Former ===
- Tsing Ma Bridge, Ma Wan Viaduct and Kap Shui Mun Bridge, known collectively as the Lantau Link - opened in 1997, toll eliminated in 2018

== India ==
- Aathupalam Bridge - The 32.2 metre bridge in Coimbatore, Tamil Nadu was part of the first private road project in South India.
- Bandra–Worli Sea Link - Cable-stayed, open to sea bridge in Mumbai
- DND Flyway - Connecting New Delhi with Noida and hence the name. (DND stands for Delhi–Noida Direct).
- Vidyasagar Setu - Cable stayed, connects Kolkata and Howrah.

== Indonesia ==
- Suramadu Bridge - a cable-stayed bridge between the islands of Java and Madura

== Ireland ==
- West-Link bridge on the M50. Located between Junction 6 (N3 Blanchardstown) and Junction 7 (N4 Lucan). Barrier-free tolling in operation.
- East-Link bridge: Officially the Tom Clarke Bridge, located in the Dublin Port area.
- Mary McAleese Boyne Valley Bridge on the M1. The Northlink Toll Plaza is located on the Dundalk Western Bypass motorway, approximately 30 km north of Dublin airport on the Dublin to Belfast route
- River Suir Bridge carries the N25 over the River Suir. The toll plaza is approximately 5 km from Waterford City.

== Japan ==
- Sayama Circular Toll Road - Sayama, Saitama
- Shin-Minuma Ohashi Bridge Toll Road - Saitama, Saitama
- Wakakusa Ohashi Bridge Toll Road - Tone, Ibaraki and Sakae, Chiba
- Choshi Shin-Ohashi Bridge Toll Road - Choshi, Chiba

== Malaysia ==
- Penang Bridge
- Malaysia–Singapore Second Link
- Tun Salahuddin Bridge

== Norway ==
- Askøy Bridge - bridge toll - Route 562
- Krifast - tunnel / bridge toll - E39
- Osterøy Bridge - bridge toll - Route 566
- Skarnsund Bridge - bridge toll - Route 755
- Straum Bridge - bridge toll - Route 661
- Svinesund Bridge - bridge toll - E6
- Sykkylven Bridge - bridge toll - Route 71
- Triangle Link - tunnel/bridge toll - E39

== Portugal ==
- 25 de Abril Bridge - in Lisbon
- Vasco da Gama Bridge - in Lisbon

== Romania ==
- Giurgeni-Vadu Oii Bridge - DN2A / E60 - 13 RON
- Cernavodă Bridge - A2 / E81

== Sweden ==
- Motala Bridge
- Öresund Bridge
- Sundsvall Bridge
- Svinesund Bridge

== Turkey ==
- Bosphorus Bridge - over the Bosporus strait between Ortaköy (Europe) and Beylerbeyi (Asia) in Istanbul
- Çanakkale 1915 Bridge - over the Dardanelles strait between Gelibolu (Europe) and Lapseki (Asia) in Çanakkale Province
- Fatih Sultan Mehmet Bridge - over the Bosporus strait between Armutlu (Europe) and Kavacik (Asia) in Istanbul
- Osman Gazi Bridge - over the Gulf of İzmit between Dilovası (Kocaeli) and Altınova (Yalova).
- Yavuz Sultan Selim Bridge - over the Bosporus strait between Garipçe (Europe) and Beykoz (Asia) in Istanbul

== United Arab Emirates ==
=== Dubai ===
The Salik toll system was introduced on 1 July 2007.

- Al Garhoud Bridge, the toll gate is on the Bur Dubai side of the bridge

== United Kingdom ==
=== England ===
- Aldwark Bridge, North Yorkshire
- Bathampton Toll Bridge
- Cartford Bridge
- Clifton Suspension Bridge, Bristol
- Dartford Crossing (Dartford Tunnel northbound, and the Queen Elizabeth II Bridge southbound)
- Dunham Bridge, Nottinghamshire/Lincolnshire
- Eling Bridge, Eling Tide Mill, Hampshire
- Humber Bridge, near Hull
- Itchen Bridge, Hampshire
- Kingsland Bridge, Shrewsbury
- Middlesbrough Transporter Bridge
- Mersey Gateway Bridge, Cheshire
- Swinford Bridge, Oxfordshire
- Tamar Bridge, Plymouth
- Warburton Toll Bridge
- Whitchurch Bridge
- Whitney-on-Wye toll bridge

=== Wales ===
- Newport Transporter Bridge
- Penmaenpool Bridge

== United States ==
=== Alabama ===
Bridge name	Operated by	Road carried	Crosses	Length (ft)	Length (m)	Cash tolls (automobile)	Notes
Tuscaloosa By-Pass	DIF Capital Partners	Joe Mallisham Parkway	Black Warrior River	961.0	292.9	$1.50	Cash or Freedom Pass
Emerald Mountain Expressway	DIF Capital Partners	Emerald Mountain Expressway	Tallapoosa River	376.0	114.6	$1.50	Cash or Freedom Pass
Montgomery Expressway	DIF Capital Partners	Alabama River Parkway	Alabama River	1,015.1	309.4	$1.25	Cash or Freedom Pass

=== California ===
Bridge name	Operated by	Road carried	Crosses	Length (ft)	Length (m)	Cash tolls (automobile)	Notes
Antioch Bridge	Bay Area Toll Authority	SR 160	San Joaquin River	9,504.0	2,896.8	$8.00	Pay-by-Plate or FasTrak (Toll northbound only)
Benicia–Martinez Bridge	Bay Area Toll Authority	I-680	Carquinez Strait	8,976.0	2,735.9	$8.00	Pay-by-Plate or FasTrak (Toll northbound only)
Carquinez Bridge	Bay Area Toll Authority	I-80	Carquinez Strait	3,465.0	1,056.1	$8.00	Pay-by-Plate or FasTrak (Toll eastbound only)
Dumbarton Bridge	Bay Area Toll Authority	SR 84	San Francisco Bay	8,600.0	2,621.3	$8.00	Pay-by-Plate or FasTrak (Toll westbound only)
Golden Gate Bridge	Golden Gate Bridge, Highway and Transportation District	US 101 / SR 1	Golden Gate	8,981.0	2,737.4	$10.25/$11.50	Pay-by-Plate or FasTrak (Toll southbound only)
Richmond–San Rafael Bridge	Bay Area Toll Authority	I-580	San Francisco Bay	29,040.0	8,851.4	$8.00	Pay-by-Plate or FasTrak (Toll westbound only)
San Francisco–Oakland Bay Bridge	Bay Area Toll Authority	I-80	San Francisco Bay	20,480.0	6,242.3	$8.00	Pay-by-Plate or FasTrak (Toll westbound only)
San Mateo–Hayward Bridge	Bay Area Toll Authority	SR 92	San Francisco Bay	36,960.0	11,265.4	$8.00	Pay-by-Plate or FasTrak (Toll westbound only)

==== Former ====
Bridge name	Operated by	Road carried	Crosses	Length (ft)	Length (m)	Cash tolls (automobile)	Notes
San Diego–Coronado Bridge	California Department of Transportation	SR 75	San Diego Bay	11,179	3,407	$1.00 (Toll westbound only)	Opened in 1969; toll eliminated in 2002.
Vincent Thomas Bridge	California Department of Transportation	SR 47	Los Angeles Harbor	6,060	1,850	$0.50 (Toll westbound only)	Opened in 1963; toll eliminated in 2000.

=== Colorado ===
Bridge name	Owned by	Road carried	Crosses	Length (ft)	Length (m)	Cash tolls (automobile)	Notes
Royal Gorge Bridge	City of Cañon City	Fremont County Road 3A	Arkansas River	1,260.0	384.0	N/A	Pedestrians only with paid ticket.

=== Delaware / New Jersey ===
Bridge name	Operated by	Road carried	Crosses	Length (ft)	Length (m)	Cash tolls (automobile)	Notes
Delaware Memorial Bridge	Delaware River and Bay Authority	I-295 / US 40	Delaware River	10,765.0	3,281.2	$6.00	Cash or E-ZPass (Toll southbound/westbound only)

=== Florida ===
Bridge name	Operated by	Road carried	Crosses	Length (ft)	Length (m)	Cash tolls (automobile)	Notes
Bob Sikes Bridge	Escambia County	Escambia County Road 399	Santa Rosa Sound	4,224.0	1,287.5	$1.00	Pay-by-Plate or SunPass (Toll southbound only)
Boca Grande Causeway	Gasparilla Island Bridge Authority	Charlotte County Road 771	Gasparilla Sound	13,200.0	4,023.4	$6.00	Cash only
Broad Causeway	Town of Bay Harbor Islands	SR 922	Biscayne Bay	3,696.0	1,126.5	$3.00	Pay-by-Plate or Sunpass
Cape Coral Bridge	Lee County	Lee County Road 867A	Caloosahatchee River	3,400.0	1,036.3	$5.00	Pay-by-Plate or SunPass (Toll westbound only)
Card Sound Bridge	Monroe County	Monroe County Road 905A	Card Sound	2,800.0	853.4	$3.00	Pay-by-Plate or SunPass
Garcon Point Bridge	Santa Rosa Bay Bridge Authority	SR 281	Pensacola Bay	18,425.0	5,615.9	$2.75	Pay-by-Plate or SunPass
Hammock Dunes Bridge	Dunes Community Development District	Hammock Dunes Parkway	Atlantic Intracoastal Waterway	2,598.2	791.9	$3.00 or $.50 with pass	Cash only/Private pass available (Toll eastbound only)
Mid-Bay Bridge	Mid-Bay Bridge Authority	SR 293	Choctawhatchee Bay	19,008.0	5,793.6	$4.00	Cash or SunPass
Midpoint Memorial Bridge	Lee County	Lee County Road 884	Caloosahatchee River	6,600.0	2,011.7	$5.00	Pay-by-Plate or SunPass (Toll westbound only)
Pinellas Bayway	Florida DOT	SR 679 / SR 682	Gulf Intracoastal Waterway	45,038.4	13,727.7	$0.81 / $1.08	Pay-by-Plate or SunPass
Rickenbacker Causeway	Miami-Dade County	Crandon Boulevard	Biscayne Bay	28,512.0	8,690.5	$3.00	Pay-by-Plate or SunPass
Sanibel Causeway	Lee County	Causeway Boulevard	San Carlos Bay	15,840.0	4,828.0	$9.00	Pay-by-Plate or SunPass (Toll westbound only)
Sunshine Skyway Bridge	Florida DOT	I-275 / US 19	Tampa Bay	5,808.0	1,770.3	$1.62	Pay-by-Plate or SunPass
Venetian Causeway	Miami-Dade County	Venetian Causeway	Biscayne Bay	14,784.0	4,506.2	$3.00	Pay-by-Plate or SunPass

=== Illinois ===
Bridge name	Operated by	Road carried	Crosses	Length (ft)	Length (m)	Cash tolls (automobile)	Notes
Houbolt Road Extension Bridge	United Bridge Partners	Houbolt Road	Des Plaines River	2,112.0	643.7	$6.15	Pay-by-Plate or E-ZPass

=== Indiana ===
Bridge name	Operated by	Road carried	Crosses	Length (ft)	Length (m)	Cash tolls (automobile)	Notes
Cline Avenue Bridge	United Bridge Partners	SR 912	Indiana Harbor Canal	8,448.0	2,575.0	$8.00	Pay-by-Plate or E-ZPass

=== Kentucky / Indiana ===
Bridge name	Operated by	Road carried	Crosses	Length (ft)	Length (m)	Cash tolls (automobile)	Notes
Abraham Lincoln Bridge	Louisville–Southern Indiana Bridge Authority	I-65 Northbound	Ohio River	2,100.0	640.1	$5.57 (July 1, 2026 - June 30, 2027)	Pay-by-Plate or E-ZPass, no cash accepted
John F. Kennedy Memorial Bridge	Louisville–Southern Indiana Bridge Authority	I-65 Southbound	Ohio River	2,498.0	761.4	$5.57 (July 1, 2026 - June 30, 2027)	Pay-by-Plate or E-ZPass, no cash accepted
Lewis and Clark Bridge	Louisville–Southern Indiana Bridge Authority	I-265 / KY 841	Ohio River	2,500.0	762.0	$5.57 (July 1, 2026 - June 30, 2027)	Pay-by-Plate or E-ZPass, no cash accepted

=== Illinois / Indiana ===
Bridge name	Operated by	Road carried	Crosses	Length (ft)	Length (m)	Cash tolls (automobile)	Notes
Wabash Cannonball Bridge	City of St. Francisville, IL	Wabash Cannonball Road	Wabash River	1,441.0	439.2	$1.00	Cash only

=== Iowa / Illinois ===
Bridge name	Operated by	Road carried	Crosses	Length (ft)	Length (m)	Cash tolls (automobile)	Notes
Fort Madison Toll Bridge	BNSF Railway	IL 9	Mississippi River	1,612.0	491.3	$2.00 per passenger	Cash only (Toll eastbound only)

=== Louisiana ===
Bridge name	Operated by	Road carried	Crosses	Length (ft)	Length (m)	Cash tolls (automobile)	Notes
Avery Island Bridge	Avery Island Inc.	Main Road	Bayou Petite Anse	30.0	9.1	$1.00	Cash only
Gateway to the Gulf Expressway	Louisiana DOTD	LA 1	Bayou Lafourche	43,600.0	13,289.3	$3.75	Pay-by-Plate or GeauxPass
Lake Pontchartrain Causeway	Causeway Commission	Causeway Boulevard	Lake Pontchartrain	126,060.0	38,423.1	$5.00	Cash or GeauxPass (Toll southbound only)

==== Former ====
Bridge name	Operated by	Road carried	Crosses	Length (ft)	Length (m)	Cash tolls (automobile)	Notes
Crescent City Connection	LaDOTD and Crescent City Connection Division	US 90 Bus.	Mississippi River	13,428	4,093	$0.30 for westbound traffic (until 1964); $1.00 for eastbound traffic only ($0.40 with GeauxPass (until 2013)	Eastbound bridge opened in April 1958 (tolled until 1964), and westbound bridge opened in September 1988 (tolled from 1989 to 2013)

=== Maryland ===
Bridge name	Operated by	Road carried	Crosses	Length (ft)	Length (m)	Cash tolls (automobile)	Notes
Chesapeake Bay Bridge	Maryland Transportation Authority	US 50 / US 301	Chesapeake Bay	22,790.0	6,946.4	$4.00	Pay-by-Plate or E-ZPass (Toll eastbound only)
Governor Harry W. Nice Memorial Bridge	Maryland Transportation Authority	US 301	Potomac River	8,976.0	2,735.9	$6.00	Pay-by-Plate or E-ZPass (Toll southbound only)
Millard E. Tydings Memorial Bridge	Maryland Transportation Authority	I-95	Susquehanna River	5,061.0	1,542.6	$8.00	Pay-by-Plate or E-ZPass (Toll northbound only)
Oldtown Low Water Bridge	Privately Owned	Green Spring Road	Potomac River	318.9	97.2	$1.50	Cash or Card
Thomas J. Hatem Memorial Bridge	Maryland Transportation Authority	US 40	Susquehanna River	7,624.0	2,323.8	$8.00	Pay-by-Plate or E-ZPass (Toll eastbound only)

==== Former ====
Bridge name	Operated by	Road carried	Crosses	Length (ft)	Length (m)	Cash tolls (automobile)	Notes
Francis Scott Key Bridge	Maryland Transportation Authority	I-695	Patapsco River	8,636.0	2,632.3	$4.00	Opened in 1977, collapsed in 2024

=== Massachusetts ===
Bridge name	Operated by	Road carried	Crosses	Length (ft)	Length (m)	Cash tolls (automobile)	Notes
Tobin Bridge	Massachusetts DOT	US 1	Mystic River	11,906.0	3,628.9	$1.55	Pay-by-Plate or E-ZPass

=== Michigan ===
Bridge name	Operated by	Road Carried	Crosses	Length (ft)	Length (m)	Cash tolls (automobile)	Notes
Grosse Ile Toll Bridge	Grosse Ile Township	Bridge Road	Trenton Channel of the Detroit River	1,030.2	314.0	$2.50	Cash or "Bridge Pass"
Independence Bridge	United Bridge Partners	Truman Parkway	Saginaw River			$5.50 / $2.00	Pay-by-Plate or E-ZPass
Liberty Bridge	United Bridge Partners	Woodside Avenue / East Vermont Street	Saginaw River	2344.0	714.5	$5.50 / $2.00	Pay-by-Plate or E-ZPass
Mackinac Bridge	Mackinac Bridge Authority	I-75	Straits of Mackinac	26,372.0	8,038.2	$4.00	Cash or MacPass

=== Michigan / Ontario, Canada ===
Bridge name	Operated by	Road carried	Crosses	Length (ft)	Length (m)	Cash tolls (automobile)	Notes
Ambassador Bridge	Detroit International Bridge Co. and Canadian Transit Company	Connects between I-75 / I-96 in Michigan and Highway 3 in Ontario	Detroit River	7,500.0	2,286.0	$10.00 US or $14.00 Canadian	Cash or A-Pass
Blue Water Bridge	Michigan DOT and Federal Bridge Corporation	I-69 / I-94 / Highway 402	St. Clair River	6,178.0	1,883.1	$5.00 US or $7.00 Canadian	No cash as of April 1, 2025
Gordie Howe International Bridge	Windsor–Detroit Bridge Authority	Connects between I-75 in Michigan and Highway 401 in Ontario	Detroit River	8,448.0	2,575	$5.75 US or $8.00 Canadian	
Sault Ste. Marie International Bridge	Sault Ste. Marie Bridge Authority	I-75	St. Marys River	9,280.6	2,828.7	$4.60 US or $6.40 Canadian	Cash or Discount Electric Toll

=== Minnesota / Ontario, Canada ===
Bridge name	Operated by	Road carried	Crosses	Length (ft)	Length (m)	Cash tolls (automobile)	Notes
Fort Frances–International Falls International Bridge	Boise Cascade / Resolute Forest Products	US 53 / US 71 / Highway 71	Rainy River	948.9	289.2	$7.00	Cash only (Toll northbound only)

=== Missouri ===
==== Former ====
Bridge name	Operated by	Road carried	Crosses	Length (ft)	Length (m)	Cash tolls (automobile)	Notes
Lake of the Ozarks Community Bridge	Lake of the Ozarks Community Bridge Transportation Development District	Missouri Route MM	Lake of the Ozarks	2,702.2	823.6	$3.00	Cash only, tolls removed on April 30, 2024

=== Nebraska / Iowa ===
Bridge name	Operated by	Road Carried	Crosses	Length (ft)	Length (m)	Cash tolls (automobile)	Notes
Bellevue Bridge	Bellevue Bridge Commission	East Mission Avenue / Mills County Road H10	Missouri River	1,969.3	600.2	$1.00	Cash only
Plattsmouth Bridge	Plattsmouth Bridge Commission	Livingston Road / Mills County Road L35	Missouri River	1,413.1	430.7	$1.75	Cash only

=== New Jersey ===
Bridge name	Operated by	Road carried	Crosses	Length (ft)	Length (m)	Cash tolls (automobile)	Notes
Corsons Inlet Bridge	Cape May County Bridge Commission	Cape May County Route 619	Corsons Inlet	1,485.0	452.6	$2.50	E-ZPass or Pay-by-Plate (Toll northbound only)
Downbeach Express	Margate Bridge Company	Atlantic County Route 563	Beach Throfare	2,421.5	738.1	$2	Cash or Downbeach Express Pass
Grassy Sound Bridge	Cape May County Bridge Commission	Cape May County Route 619	Grassy Sound	1,073.2	327.1	$2.50	E-ZPass or Pay-by-Plate (Toll northbound only)
Middle Thorofare Bridge	Cape May County Bridge Commission	Cape May County Route 621	Middle Thorofare	1,044.0	318.2	$2.50	E-ZPass or Pay-by-Plate (Toll southbound only)
Ocean City-Longport Bridge	Cape May County Bridge Commission	Cape May County Route 656	Great Egg Harbor Bay	3,456.2	1,053.4	$2.50	E-ZPass or Pay-by-Plate (Toll southbound only)
Townsends Inlet Bridge	Cape May County Bridge Commission	Cape May County Route 619	Townsends Inlet	1,373.1	418.5	$2.50	E-ZPass or Pay-by-Plate (Toll southbound only)

=== New Jersey / New York ===
Bridge name	Operated by	Road carried	Crosses	Length (ft)	Length (m)	Cash tolls (automobile)	Notes
Bayonne Bridge	Port Authority of New York and New Jersey	NY 440 / Route 440 / CR 501	Kill Van Kull	5,780.0	1,761.7	$16.00	Pay-by-Plate or E-ZPass (Toll southbound only)
George Washington Bridge	Port Authority of New York and New Jersey	I-95 / US 1-9 / US 46	Hudson River	4,760.0	1,450.8	$16.00	Pay-by-Plate or E-ZPass (Toll eastbound only)
Goethals Bridge	Port Authority of New York and New Jersey	I-278	Arthur Kill	7,109.0	2,166.8	$16.00	Pay-by-Plate or E-ZPass (Toll eastbound only)
Outerbridge Crossing	Port Authority of New York and New Jersey	NY 440 / Route 440 / CR 501	Arthur Kill	10,140.0	3,090.7	$16.00	Pay-by-Plate or E-ZPass (Toll eastbound only)

=== New Jersey / Pennsylvania ===
Bridge name	Operated by	Road carried	Crosses	Length (ft)	Length (m)	Cash tolls (automobile)	Notes
Benjamin Franklin Bridge	Delaware River Port Authority	I-676 / US 30	Delaware River	9,573.0	2,917.9	$5.00	Cash or E-ZPass (Toll westbound only)
Betsy Ross Bridge	Delaware River Port Authority	Route 90	Delaware River	8,485.0	2,586.2	$5.00	Cash or E-ZPass (Toll westbound only)
Burlington–Bristol Bridge	Burlington County Bridge Commission	Route 413 / PA 413	Delaware River	2,301.0	701.3	$4.00	Cash or E-ZPass (Toll northbound only)
Commodore Barry Bridge	Delaware River Port Authority	US 322 / CR 536	Delaware River	13,912.0	4,240.4	$5.00	Cash or E-ZPass (Toll westbound only)
Delaware River–Turnpike Toll Bridge	New Jersey Turnpike Authority / Pennsylvania Turnpike Commission	I-95	Delaware River	6,751.0	2,057.7	$8.20	Pay-by-Plate or E-ZPass (Toll southbound only)
Delaware Water Gap Toll Bridge	Delaware River Joint Toll Bridge Commission	I-80	Delaware River	2,465.0	751.3	$3.00	Pay-by-Plate or E-ZPass (Toll westbound only)
Dingman's Ferry Bridge	Dingmans Choice and Delaware Bridge Co.	PA 739 / CR 560	Delaware River	530.0	161.5	$3.00	Cash only, the last privately owned toll bridge on the Delaware
Easton–Phillipsburg Toll Bridge	Delaware River Joint Toll Bridge Commission	US 22	Delaware River	1,020.0	310.9	$3.00	Pay-by-Plate or E-ZPass (Toll westbound only)
Interstate 78 Toll Bridge	Delaware River Joint Toll Bridge Commission	I-78	Delaware River	1,220.0	371.9	$3.00	Pay-by-Plate or E-ZPass (Toll westbound only)
Milford–Montague Toll Bridge	Delaware River Joint Toll Bridge Commission	US 206	Delaware River	1,150.0	350.5	$3.00	Pay-by-Plate or E-ZPass (Toll northbound only)
New Hope–Lambertville Toll Bridge	Delaware River Joint Toll Bridge Commission	US 202	Delaware River	1,682.0	512.7	$3.00	Pay-by-Plate or E-ZPass (Toll southbound only)
Portland–Columbia Toll Bridge	Delaware River Joint Toll Bridge Commission	Route 94	Delaware River	1,309.0	399.0	$3.00	Pay-by-Plate or E-ZPass (Toll westbound only)
Scudder Falls Bridge	Delaware River Joint Toll Bridge Commission	I-295	Delaware River	1,740.0	530.4	$3.00	Pay-by-plate or E-ZPass (Toll westbound only)
Tacony–Palmyra Bridge	Burlington County Bridge Commission	Route 73 / PA 73	Delaware River	3,659.0	1,115.3	$4.00	Cash or E-ZPass (Toll northbound only)
Trenton–Morrisville Toll Bridge	Delaware River Joint Toll Bridge Commission	US 1	Delaware River	1,324.0	403.6	$3.00	Pay-by-Plate or E-ZPass (Toll southbound only)
Walt Whitman Bridge	Delaware River Port Authority	I-76	Delaware River	11,981.0	3,651.8	$5.00	Cash or E-ZPass (Toll westbound only)

=== New York state ===
Bridge name	Operated by	Road carried	Crosses	Length (ft)	Length (m)	Cash tolls (automobile)	Notes
Atlantic Beach Bridge	Nassau County Bridge Authority	NY 878	Reynolds Channel	1,173.0	357.5	$4.00	Cash or E-ZPass
Bear Mountain Bridge	New York State Bridge Authority	US 6 / US 202	Hudson River	2,255.0	687.3	$1.50	Pay-by-Plate or E-ZPass (Toll eastbound only)
Bronx–Whitestone Bridge	Metropolitan Transportation Authority	I-678	East River	3,770.0	1,149.1	$9.50	Pay-by-Plate or E-ZPass
Cross Bay Veterans Memorial Bridge	Metropolitan Transportation Authority	Cross Bay Boulevard	Jamaica Bay	3,000.0	914.4	$4.75	Pay-by-Plate or E-ZPass
Henry Hudson Bridge	Metropolitan Transportation Authority	NY 9A	Spuyten Duyvil Creek	2,208.0	673.0	$7.00	Pay-by-Plate or E-ZPass
Kingston–Rhinecliff Bridge	New York State Bridge Authority	NY 199	Hudson River	7,793.0	2,375.3	$1.50	Pay-by-Plate or E-ZPass (Toll eastbound only)
Marine Parkway–Gil Hodges Memorial Bridge	Metropolitan Transportation Authority	Flatbush Avenue	Jamaica Bay	4,022.0	1,225.9	$4.75	Pay-by-Plate or E-ZPass
Mid-Hudson Bridge	New York State Bridge Authority	US 44 / NY 55	Hudson River	3,000.0	914.4	$1.50	Pay-by-Plate or E-ZPass (Toll eastbound only)
Newburgh–Beacon Bridge	New York State Bridge Authority	I-84 / NY 52	Hudson River	7,855.0	2,394.2	$1.50	Pay-by-Plate or E-ZPass (Toll eastbound only)
North Grand Island Bridge	New York State Thruway Authority	I-190 / NY 324	Niagara River	4,000.0	1,219.2	$1.00	Pay-by-Plate or E-ZPass (Toll southbound only)
Rip Van Winkle Bridge	New York State Bridge Authority	NY 23	Hudson River	5,040.0	1,536.2	$1.50	Pay-by-Plate or E-ZPass (Toll eastbound only)
South Grand Island Bridge	New York State Thruway Authority	I-190 / NY 324	Niagara River	3,400.0	1,036.3	$1.00	Pay-by-Plate or E-ZPass (Toll northbound only)
Tappan Zee Bridge	New York State Thruway Authority	I-87 / I-287	Hudson River	16,013.0	4,880.8	$6.83	Pay-by-Plate or E-ZPass (Toll eastbound only)
Throgs Neck Bridge	Metropolitan Transportation Authority	I-295	East River	2,910.0	887.0	$9.50	Pay-by-Plate or E-ZPass
Triborough Bridge	Metropolitan Transportation Authority	I-278	East River / Harlem River / Bronx Kill	5,150.0	1,569.7	$9.50	Pay-by-Plate or E-ZPass
Verrazzano–Narrows Bridge	Metropolitan Transportation Authority	I-278	The Narrows	13,700.0	4,175.8	$6.55	Pay-by-Plate or E-ZPass

=== New York state / Ontario, Canada ===
Bridge name	Operated by	Road carried	Crosses	Length (ft)	Length (m)	Cash tolls (automobile)	Notes
Lewiston–Queenston Bridge	Niagara Falls Bridge Commission	I-190 / Highway 405	Niagara River	1,594.0	485.9	$5.00	Cash or E-ZPass (Toll westbound only)
Ogdensburg–Prescott International Bridge	Ogdensburg Bridge and Port Authority	NY 812 / Highway 16	Saint Lawrence River	7,920.0	2,414.0	$3.25	Cash only
Peace Bridge	Buffalo and Fort Erie Public Bridge Authority	Queen Elizabeth Way	Niagara River	5,800.0	1,767.8	$8.00	Cash or E-ZPass (Toll westbound only)
Rainbow Bridge	Niagara Falls Bridge Commission	NY 384 / Highway 420	Niagara River	1,450.0	442.0	$5.00	Cash or E-ZPass (Toll westbound only)
Thousand Islands Bridge	Thousand Islands Bridge Authority	I-81	Saint Lawrence River	800.0	243.8	$4.00	Cash or E-ZPass
Whirlpool Rapids Bridge	Niagara Falls Bridge Commission	NY 182	Niagara River	1,079.4	329.0	$3.25	NEXUS only (with or without E-ZPass) (Toll westbound only)

=== Oregon / Washington ===
Bridge name	Operated by	Road carried	Crosses	Length (ft)	Length (m)	Cash tolls (automobile)	Notes
Bridge of the Gods	Port of Cascade Locks Commission	Bridge of the Gods Road	Columbia River	1,856.0	565.7	$3.00	Cash or BreezeBy
Hood River Bridge	Port of Hood River	Hood River Bridge Road	Columbia River	1,346.67	410.47	$3.50	Online or BreezeBy

==== Former ====
Bridge name	Operated by	Road carried	Crosses	Length (ft)	Length (m)	Cash tolls (automobile)	Notes
Astoria–Megler Bridge	ODOT	US 101	Columbia River	21,474	6,545	$0.50	Opened in 1966; toll eliminated in 1993.
Interstate Bridge	ODOT, WSDOT	U.S. Route 99 (1926 to 1972) and Interstate 5 (1957 to present)	Columbia River	3,538	1,078	$0.05 (1917 to 1929) and $0.20 (1960 to 1966)	Northbound bridge opened in 1917; southbound bridge opened in 1958

=== Puerto Rico ===
Bridge name	Operated by	Road carried	Crosses	Length (ft)	Length (m)	Cash tolls (automobile)	Notes
Teodoro Moscoso Bridge	Autopistas de Puerto Rico	PR-17	San Jose Lagoon	7,392.0	2,253.1	$3.40	Cash or AutoExpreso

=== Rhode Island ===
Bridge name	Operated by	Road carried	Crosses	Length (ft)	Length (m)	Cash tolls (automobile)	Notes
Claiborne Pell Newport Bridge	Rhode Island Turnpike and Bridge Authority	Route 138	Narragansett Bay	11,248.0	3,428.4	$4.00	Pay-by-Plate or E-ZPass

=== Texas ===
Bridge name	Operated by	Road carried	Crosses	Length (ft)	Length (m)	Cash tolls (automobile)	Notes
Lewisville Lake Toll Bridge	North Texas Tollway Authority	Eldorado Parkway	Lewisville Lake	8,520.4	2,597.0	$1.88	Pay-by-Plate or TollTag
Mountain Creek Lake Bridge	North Texas Tollway Authority	East Pioneer Parkway (connecting to Spur 303)	Mountain Creek Lake	7,425.0	2,263.1	$0.95	Pay-by-Plate or TollTag
Sam Houston Ship Channel Bridge	Harris County Toll Road Authority	Sam Houston Tollway	Houston Ship Channel	1,560.0	475.5	$2.00	EZ TAG only

==== Former ====
Bridge name	Operated by	Road carried	Crosses	Length (ft)	Length (m)	Cash tolls (automobile)	Notes
San Luis Pass-Vacek Toll Bridge	Galveston County	Bluewater Highway	San Luis Pass	7,016.0	2,138.5	$2.00 cash only toll (at time of discontinuation)	Opened prior to 1970; toll eliminated in 2025.

=== Texas / Chihuahua, Mexico ===
Bridge name	Operated by	Road carried	Crosses	Length (ft)	Length (m)	Cash tolls (automobile)	Notes
Paso del Norte International Bridge	City of El Paso	US 85	Rio Grande	982.0	299.3	$3.00	Northbound traffic only
Stanton Street Bridge	City of El Paso	US 62	Rio Grande	880.0	268.2	$3.00	Cash or AVI Transponder (Toll southbound only)
Ysleta–Zaragoza International Bridge	City of El Paso	Zaragoza Road	Rio Grande	804.0	245.1	$3.00	Cash or AVI Transponder
Fabens–Caseta International Bridge	El Paso County	Tornillo-Guadalupe Road	Rio Grande	1,274.0	388.3	$0.00	Temporarily toll free

=== Texas / Coahuila, Mexico ===
Bridge name	Operated by	Road carried	Crosses	Length (ft)	Length (m)	Cash tolls (automobile)	Notes
Del Río–Ciudad Acuña International Bridge	City of Del Rio	Spur 239	Rio Grande	2,035.0	620.3	$3.50	Cash or AVI Transponder
Eagle Pass–Piedras Negras International Bridge	City of Eagle Pass	US 57 / Fed. 57	Rio Grande	1,855.0	565.4	$3.00	Cash or AVI Transponder
Camino Real International Bridge	City of Eagle Pass	South Monroe Street	Rio Grande	1,384.0	421.8	$3.00	Cash or AVI Transponder

=== Texas / Nuevo León, Mexico ===
Bridge name	Operated by	Road carried	Crosses	Length (ft)	Length (m)	Cash tolls (automobile)	Notes
Laredo–Colombia Solidarity International Bridge	City of Laredo	SH 255	Rio Grande	1,216.0	370.6	$3.50	Cash or AVI Transponder

=== Texas / Tamaulipas, Mexico ===
Bridge name	Operated by	Road carried	Crosses	Length (ft)	Length (m)	Cash tolls (automobile)	Notes
World Trade International Bridge	City of Laredo	I-69W / US 59 / Loop 20	Rio Grande	977.0	297.8	$4.25	Cash or AVI Transponder
Gateway to the Americas International Bridge	City of Laredo	Convent Avenue and Salinas Avenue	Rio Grande	1,050.0	320.0	$3.50	Cash or AVI Transponder
Juárez–Lincoln International Bridge	City of Laredo	I-35	Rio Grande	1,008.0	307.2	$3.50	Cash or AVI Transponder
Roma–Ciudad Miguel Alemán International Bridge	Starr County	Spur 200	Rio Grande	810.0	246.9	$3.50	Cash only
Rio Grande City–Camargo International Bridge	Starr-Camargo Bridge Company	FM 755	Rio Grande	591.0	180.1	$3.50	Cash only
Anzalduas International Bridge	City of McAllen	FM 396	Rio Grande	16,896.0	5,149.9	$3.00	Cash or ANI Transponder
McAllen–Hidalgo–Reynosa International Bridge	City of McAllen	Spur 115	Rio Grande	524.0	159.7	$3.50	Cash only
Pharr–Reynosa International Bridge	City of Pharr	Spur 600	Rio Grande	15,770.0	4,806.7	$3.50	Cash or AVI Transponder
Donna–Río Bravo International Bridge	City of Donna	Hidalgo County Road 1554	Rio Grande	1,000.0	304.8	$3.50	Cash only
Progreso–Nuevo Progreso International Bridge	B & P Bridge Company of Weslaco	FM 1015	Rio Grande	628.0	191.4	$3.00	Cash only
Free Trade International Bridge	Cameron County	FM 509	Rio Grande	503.0	153.3	$3.25	Cash or AVI Transponder
Brownsville & Matamoros International Bridge	Brownsville & Matamoros Bridge Company	12th Street	Rio Grande	226.0	68.9	$3.00	Cash or Pre-paid Express Cards
Gateway International Bridge	Cameron County	International Boulevard (SH 4)	Rio Grande	687.0	209.4	$3.25	Cash or AVI Transponder
Veterans International Bridge at Los Tomates	Cameron County	I-69E / US 77 / US 83	Rio Grande	4,024.0	1,226.5	$3.50	Cash or AVI Transponder

=== Virginia ===
Bridge name	Operated by	Road carried	Crosses	Length (ft)	Length (m)	Cash tolls (automobile)	Notes
Boulevard Bridge	Richmond Metropolitan Authority	SR 161	James River	2,030.0	618.7	$1.00	Pay-by-Plate or E-ZPass
Chesapeake Bay Bridge–Tunnel	Chesapeake Bay Bridge and Tunnel Commission	US 13	Chesapeake Bay	92,928.0	28,324.5	$15.00	Cash or E-ZPass
George P. Coleman Memorial Bridge	Virginia DOT	US 17	York River	3,750.6	1,143.2	$2.00	Cash or E-ZPass (Toll northbound only)
South Norfolk Jordan Bridge	United Bridge Partners	SR 337	Southern Branch Elizabeth River	5,375.0	1,638.3	$2.25	Pay-by-Plate or E-ZPass
Veterans Bridge (Chesapeake, Virginia)	City of Chesapeake	US 17	Southern Branch Elizabeth River	5,280.0	1,609.3	$3.22	Pay-by-Plate or E-ZPass

=== Washington state ===
Bridge name	Operated by	Road carried	Crosses	Length (ft)	Length (m)	Cash tolls (automobile)	Notes
Evergreen Point Floating Bridge	Washington State DOT	SR 520	Lake Washington	7,710.0	2,350.0	Varies $3.25 - $6.30	Pay-by-Plate or Good to Go pass
Tacoma Narrows Bridge	Washington State DOT	SR 16	Tacoma Narrows	5,400.0	1,645.9	$6.50	Cash or Good to Go pass (Toll eastbound only)

==== Former ====
Bridge name	Operated by	Road carried	Crosses	Length (ft)	Length (m)	Cash tolls (automobile)	Notes
Evergreen Point Floating Bridge (1963)	Washington State DOT	SR 520	Lake Washington	7,578.0	2,309.8	$0.35 (1963 to 1979) and various tolls (2011 to 2016)	Opened in 1963; was toll-free from 1979 to 2011; bridge closed in 2016
Maple Street Bridge	City of Spokane	Maple Street	Peaceful Valley / Spokane River	1,708	521	$0.10	Opened in 1958; toll eliminated in 1990.

=== West Virginia / Ohio ===
Bridge name	Operated by	Road Carried	Crosses	Length (ft)	Length (m)	Cash tolls (automobile)	Notes
Memorial Bridge	Parkersburg Bridge Partners	Memorial Bridge Road	Ohio River	2,555.2	778.8	$1.00	Pay-by-Plate or E-ZPass
Wayne Six Toll Bridge	Newell Bridge and Railway Company	Golding Street	Ohio River	1,590.0	484.6	$0.75	Cash only

== See also ==
- List of toll roads
