= List of toll roads in the United States =

Map of states that use E-ZPass or a compatible electronic tolling system, as of May 28, 2021, for any roads (or bridges or tunnels not on this list). State uses E-ZPass or has an electronic tolling system that is compatible with E-ZPass State has an electronic tolling system that is not compatible with E-ZPass State collects tolls but does not use electronic tolling State or district does not have tolls

This is a list of toll roads in the United States (and its territories). Included are current and future high-occupancy toll (HOT) lanes, express toll (ETL) lanes, and hybrid systems. HOV, as used in this article, is high occupancy vehicle.

This list does not include items on the list of toll bridges, list of toll tunnels, nor list of ferry operators.

== Alabama ==
Road name	Length (mi)	Length (km)	Southern or western terminus	Northern or eastern terminus	Cash tolls (automobile)	Notes
Tuscaloosa By-Pass	4.9	7.9	I-20 / I-59 – Tuscaloosa	US 82 – Northport	$1.50 bridge only	Cash or Freedom Pass
Emerald Mountain Expressway	1.2	1.9	Wares Ferry Road – Montgomery	Rifle Range Road – Montgomery	$1.75 bridge only	Cash or Freedom Pass
Montgomery Expressway	6.9	11.1	SR 152 – Montgomery	SR 143 – Prattville	$1.50 Alabama River Toll Bridge only	Cash or Freedom Pass

== Arizona ==
Road name	Length (mi)	Length (km)	Southern or western terminus	Northern or eastern terminus	Cash tolls (automobile)	Notes
SR 64			Tusayan	Cameron	$35	Toll is entrance fee for Grand Canyon National Park.

== California ==
Road name	Length (mi)	Length (km)	Southern or western terminus	Northern or eastern terminus	Cash tolls (automobile)	Notes
SR 73 (San Joaquin Hills Toll Road)	12.0	19.3	I-5 – Laguna Niguel	Bison Avenue – Irvine/Newport Beach	$8.82	All-electronic toll; allows both FasTrak and toll-by-plate
SR 125 (South Bay Expressway)	10.0	16.1	SR 11 / SR 905 – Otay Mesa	SR 54 – Spring Valley	$2.75 (FasTrak) $3.50 (cash/credit card)	Cash, credit card or FasTrak
SR 133 / SR 241 / SR 261 (Eastern Toll Road)	24.0	38.6	I-5 – Irvine	SR 91 – Anaheim	$7.74 (east branch) $7.56 (west branch)	All-electronic toll; allows both FasTrak and toll-by-plate
SR 241 (Foothill Toll Road)	12.0	19.3	Oso Parkway – Rancho Santa Margarita	SR 133 (Eastern Toll Road)	$6.66	All-electronic toll; allows both FasTrak and toll-by-plate
17 Mile Drive	17.0	27.4	Pebble Beach	Pacific Grove	$11.25	Private road. Cash, motorcycles prohibited
SR 120 (Tioga Road)			Groveland	Lee Vining	$20.00	No cash accepted. Reservations required, toll is entrance fee for Yosemite National Park. Open in summer only.
SR 89 (Lassen Volcanic National Park Highway)			Morgan Summit	Summertown	$30	Toll is entrance fee for Lassen Volcanic National Park. No cash.
SR 198 SR 180 (Generals Hwy and Kings Canyon Highway)			Three Rivers	Pinehurst	$35	Toll is entrance fee for Kings Canyon National Park and Sequoia National Park.

=== Managed lanes ===
Road name	Length (mi)	Length (km)	Southern or western terminus	Northern or eastern terminus	Cash tolls (automobile)	Notes
I-10 (El Monte Busway)	14.0	22.5	Alameda Street – Los Angeles	I-605 – Baldwin Park	$0.25~$1.40 /mi	All-electronic toll; must have FasTrak; HOV-3+ and motorcycles toll-free from 5–9 am; 4–7 pm Mon–Fri; HOV-2+ toll free during off peak hours
I-10 (Express Lanes) in San Bernardino County	10.0	16.1	Los Angeles County – Montclair	I-15 – Ontario	Variable toll pricing	2 lanes per direction; All-electronic toll; HOV-3+ and motorcycles toll-free; clean-air vehicles receive 10% discount
I-15 (Express Lanes) in San Diego County	20.0	32.2	SR 163 – San Diego	SR 78 – Escondido	$0.50~$8.00	All-electronic toll; must have FasTrak; HOV-2+ and motorcycles toll-free
I-15 (Express Lanes) in Riverside County	15.0	24.1	Cajalco Road – Corona	SR 60 – Jurupa Valley	$2.60~$13.00	All-electronic toll; must have FasTrak; HOV-3+ and motorcycles toll-free
I-110 (Harbor Transitway)	11.0	17.7	182nd Street – Los Angeles	Adams Boulevard – Los Angeles	$0.25~$1.40 /mi	All-electronic toll; must have FasTrak; HOV-2+ and motorcycles toll-free
US 101 (Express Lanes)	27.0	43.5	SR 237 – Sunnyvale	I-380 – South San Francisco	Variable toll pricing	All-electronic toll; must have Fastrak; HOV-3+ and motorcycles toll-free; HOV-2 and single-occupant clean air vehicles pay half-price
I-405 (Express Lanes)	16.0	25.7	SR 73 – Costa Mesa	I-605 – Seal Beach	$2.70~$9.95	2 lanes per direction; all-electronic toll, must have Fastrak; HOV-3+ and motorcycles toll-free; HOV-2 free during off-peak hours; clean-air vehicles receive 15% discount
I-580 (Express Lanes)	11.9	19.2	I-680 – Pleasanton	Northfront Road - Livermore	Variable toll pricing	All-electronic toll; must have Fastrak; HOV-2+ and motorcycles toll-free; single-occupant clean air vehicles pay half-price
I-680 (Contra Costa Express Lanes)	12.0 (northbound); 23.5 (southbound)	19.4 (northbound); 37.9 (southbound)	Alcosta Boulevard – San Ramon	Livorna Road – Alamo (northbound); Marina Vista Avenue – Vine Hill (southbound)	Variable toll pricing	All-electronic toll; must have Fastrak; HOV-2+, motorcycles toll-free; single-occupant clean air vehicles pay half-price
I-680 (Sunol Express Lanes)	8.0 (northbound); 13.8 (southbound)	12.9 (northbound); 22.2 (southbound)	Grimmer Boulevard – Fremont (northbound); SR 237 – Milpitas (southbound)	SR 84 – Sunol	Variable toll pricing	All-electronic toll; must have Fastrak; HOV-2+ and motorcycles toll-free; single-occupant clean air vehicles pay half-price
I-880 (Express Lanes)	17.9 (northbound); 26.4 (southbound)	28.9 (northbound); 42.6 (southbound)	Dixon Landing Road – Milpitas	Lewelling Boulevard – San Leandro (northbound); Hegenberger Road – Oakland (southbound)	Variable toll pricing	All-electronic toll; must have FasTrak; HOV-3+ and motorcycles toll-free; HOV-2 and single-occupant clean air vehicles pay half-price
SR 237 (Express Lanes)	7.9	12.7	North Mathilda Avenue – Sunnyvale	Dixon Landing Road – Milpitas	Variable toll pricing	All-electronic toll; must have FasTrak; HOV-3+ and motorcycles toll-free; HOV-2 and single-occupant clean air vehicles pay half-price
SR 91 (Express Lanes)	18.0	29.0	SR 55 – Anaheim	McKinley Street / I-15 – Corona	$3.65~$29.10	All-electronic toll; must have FasTrak; HOV-3+ and motorcycles receive 50% discount when driving eastbound between 4–6 pm Mon-Fri, or toll-free for all other times and westbound travel.

== Colorado ==
Road name	Length (mi)	Length (km)	Southern or western terminus	Northern or eastern terminus	Cash tolls (automobile)	Notes
E-470	47.0	75.6	I-25 / SH 470 in Lone Tree	I-25 / Northwest Parkway in Thornton	$22.25	All-electronic toll; Toll tags accepted on E-470 include: ExpressToll, TollTags, K-TAG, Pikepass, and SunPass Pro. With no compatible toll tag, drivers can be billed the higher license plate toll rate.
Northwest Parkway	8.0	12.9	96th Street in Broomfield	I-25 / E-470 in Broomfield	$7.50	All-electronic toll; allows Go-Pass, ExpressToll and license plate toll
Pikes Peak Highway	19.0	30.6	Dead end at Pikes Peak	Chipita Park Road in Cascade-Chipita Park	$10 per adult, $5 per child, $50 per carload, discounts available for any additional passengers	Tolls serve as an entrance fee
US 36 US 34 (Trail Ridge Road)	48.0	77.2	US 34 at Estes Park	US 34 in Grand Lake	$15.00	1-Day for every Entrance Pass; tolls serve as an entrance fee for Rocky Mountain National Park.

Managed lanes

ExpressToll is also part of the Central United States Interoperability Hub. With the Central Hub, most of Colorado toll facilities (The Northwest Parkway currently not included) will now accept transponders issued in Kansas, Texas (TxTag and EZTag will be accepted in the near future), Oklahoma and Florida.

Toll tags accepted on all Colorado tolled Express Lanes include: ExpressToll, TollTags, K-TAG, Pikepass, and SunPass Pro. With no compatible toll tag, drivers can be billed the higher license plate toll rate.

Road name	Length (mi)	Length (km)	Southern or western terminus	Northern or eastern terminus	Cash tolls (automobile)	Notes
I-25 (Express Lanes)	7.0	11.3	19th Avenue in Downtown Denver	US 36 in Thornton	$1.25~$7.15	All-electronic toll; allows ExpressToll, TollTags, K-TAG, Pikepass, SunPass Pro, and license plate toll; reversible lanes; HOV-3+ toll-free with a switchable ExpressToll+ transponder which can slide to the HOV indicator; motorcycles toll-free
I-25 (North Express Lanes)	10.7	17.2	US 36 in Thornton	E-470 in Broomfield	$1.30~$3.65	All-electronic toll; allows ExpressToll, TollTags, K-TAG, Pikepass, SunPass Pro, and license plate toll; HOV-3+ must have an ExpressToll+ transponder which they can slide to the HOV indicator to ride free; motorcycles and RTD buses toll-free
I-25 (South Express Lanes)	18.0	29.0	Palmer Divide Road in Woodmoor	Plum Creek Parkway in Castle Rock	$1.50~$3.75	All-electronic toll; allows ExpressToll, TollTags, K-TAG, Pikepass, SunPass Pro, and license plate toll; HOV-3+ must have an ExpressToll+ transponder which they can slide to the HOV indicator to ride free; motorcycles and RTD buses toll-free
I-70 (Mountain Express Lanes)	13.0	20.9	US 40 in Empire	I-70 Bus. in Idaho Springs	$8.00~$16.25	Widened shoulder serves as a third lane during peak travel periods, weekends and holidays; only the shoulder is tolled; all-electronic toll; allows ExpressToll, TollTags, K-TAG, Pikepass, SunPass Pro, and license plate toll
I-70 (Central Express Lanes)	10.0	16.1	Brighton Boulevard in Denver	Chambers Road in Aurora	$1.50~$4.50	All-electronic toll; allows ExpressToll, TollTags, K-TAG, Pikepass, SunPass Pro, and license plate toll; HOV-3+ must have an ExpressToll+ transponder which they can slide to the HOV indicator to ride free; motorcycles and RTD buses are toll-free
US 36 (Express Lanes)	16.0	25.7	Table Mesa Drive in Boulder	US 287 in Westminster	$2.45~$9.40	All-electronic toll; allows ExpressToll, TollTags, K-TAG, Pikepass, SunPass Pro, and license plate toll; HOV-3+ must have an ExpressToll+ transponder which they can slide to the HOV indicator to ride free; motorcycles and RTD buses are toll-free
SH 470 (Express Lanes)	12.5	20.1	I-25 in Lone Tree	Wadsworth Boulevard in Littleton	$1.50~$6.60	All-electronic toll; allows ExpressToll, TollTags, K-TAG, Pikepass, SunPass Pro_{,} and license plate toll; motorcyclists are toll-free

== Delaware ==
Road name	Length (mi)	Length (km)	Southern or western terminus	Northern or eastern terminus	Cash tolls (automobile)	Notes
I-95 / Delaware Turnpike	11.75	18.91	I-95 – Maryland state line	I-95 / I-295 / US 202 / DE 141 – Newport	$4	Cash or E-ZPass
DE 1 (Korean War Veterans Highway)	51.0	82.1	DE 1 / DE 9 – Dover	DE 7 / DE 58 – Churchmans Crossing	$1 (weekdays) $3 (weekends)	Cash or E-ZPass
US 301 (First Responders Memorial Highway)	11.9	19.2	US 301 – Maryland state line	DE 1 – Biddles Corner	$4 (E-ZPass) $5.60 (video tolling)	E-ZPass or video tolling

== Florida ==
E-ZPass is accepted on all CFX owned roadways. As of May 2021, SunPass is interoperable with E-ZPass; E-ZPass is now accepted on SunPass-compatible roads while SunPass account holders now have the option to obtain a SunPass tag that can be used on E-ZPass toll roads.

Road name	Length (mi)	Length (km)	Southern or western terminus	Northern or eastern terminus	Cash tolls (automobile)	Notes
I-75 (Alligator Alley)	83.91	135.04	CR 951	I-595 / SR 869	$3.51	Open road tolling
Florida's Turnpike	264.67	425.95	I-95 / US 441 / SR 826 at the Golden Glades Interchange in Miami Gardens	I-75 near Wildwood	$23.97	Open road tolling
SR 23 (First Coast Expressway)	29	47	I-10 in Jacksonville	SR 16 near Green Cove Springs	$6.55	Open road tolling; extension to I-95 planned.
SR 112 (Airport Expressway)	4.132	6.650	Miami International Airport – Miami	I-95 – Miami	$1.32	Open road tolling
SR 293	11.0	17.7	Mid-Bay Bridge in Niceville, Florida	SR 85 in Niceville, Florida	$2.00	Open road tolling; cash accepted on Mid Bay Bridge only
SR 408 (East-West Expressway)	22.107	35.578	Turnpike / SR 91 near Ocoee	SR 50 near Bithlo	$9.60	Open road tolling
SR 414 (John Land Apopka Expressway)	6.53	10.51	US 441 near Lockhart	US 17 / US 92	$2.76	Open road tolling
SR 417 (Central Florida Greeneway / Seminole Expressway)	54.061	87.003	I-4 near Celebration	I-4 – Sanford	$15.21	Open road tolling
SR 429 (Western Beltway / Wekiva Parkway)	53.61	86.28	I-4 near Walt Disney World	I-4 / SR 417 near Sanford	$14.61	Open road tolling
SR 451	1.868	3.006	SR 414 / SR 429 - Apopka	US 441 - Apopka	N/A	
SR 453	3.360	5.407	Florida State Road 429 (Wekiva Parkway)	Florida State Road 46	$1.58	Open road tolling
SR 528 (Beachline Expressway)	53.5	86.1	I-4 near Lake Buena Vista	I-95 near Cocoa	$6.54	Open road tolling; continues east of I-95 as a free expressway
SR 538 (Poninciana Parkway)	8.6	13.8	US 17 / US 92 in Loughman	CR 580 (Cypress Parkway) in Poinciana	$5.54	Open road tolling
SR 568 (Veterans Expressway)	15.172	24.417	SR 589 – Cheval	SR 597 – Cheval	N/A	Open road tolling
SR 570 (Polk Parkway)	24.380	39.236	I-4 near Plant City	I-4 near Polk City	$4.62	Open road tolling
SR 589 (Veterans Expressway / Suncoast Parkway)	67.730	109.001	I-275 / SR 60 near Tampa	SR 44 near Lecanto	$9.67	Open road tolling
SR 618 (Selmon Expressway)	14.132	22.743	US 92 – Tampa	I-75 – Brandon	$5.44	Open road tolling
SR 686A (Gateway Expressway)	2.7	4.3	SR 690 – Clearwater	CR 611 – Clearwater	$0.86	Open road tolling
SR 690 (Gateway Expressway)	4.3	6.9	US 19 – Clearwater	I-275 – St. Petersburg	$0.86	Open road tolling
Florida's Turnpike Extension	47.856	77.017	US 1 – Florida City	Turnpike / SR 91	$5.80	Open road tolling
SR 836 (Dolphin Expressway)	14.204	22.859	NW 137th Avenue, Tamiami	I-95 – Miami	$4.52	Open road tolling
SR 869 (Sawgrass Expressway)	21.835	35.140	I-75 / I-595	Turnpike / SR 91	$2.90	Open road tolling
SR 874 (Don Shula Expressway)	7.034	11.320	Turnpike Extension / SR 821	SR 826 – Glenvar Heights	$1.86	Open road tolling
SR 878 (Snapper Creek Expressway)	2.658	4.278	SR 874 – Kendall	US 1 – South Miami	$0.92	Open road tolling
SR 924 (Gratigny Parkway)	5.378	8.655	I-75 / SR 826	SR 953 – Opa-Locka	$1.88	Open road tolling
CR 522	4.5	7.2 (Osceola Parkway)	Lake Buena Vista area	Northern Kissimmee	$4.12	Open road tolling
CR 0344	5.2	8.4	CR 0361 – Tallahassee	CR 155 – Tallahassee	$3.34	Open road tolling; privately built
SR 551 (Goldenrod Road Extension)	1.2	1.9	Cargo Road, Orlando International Airport, Orlando	SR 551 – Orlando	$1.00	To revert to City of Orlando when costs are paid off
I-4/Selmon Expressway Connector To I-4 / SR 618	1.0	1.6	SR 618 – Tampa	I-4 – Tampa	$1.41	Open road tolling

=== Managed lanes ===
In Florida, all vehicles in managed lanes are required to have a SunPass, E-Pass, E-ZPass, Peach Pass, or NC Quick Pass to use the lanes. The Lee Roy Selmon Express lanes permits Toll by plate travel as well as the use of transponders.

Road name	Length (mi)	Length (km)	Southern or western terminus	Northern or eastern terminus	Cash tolls (automobile)	Notes
I-4	21	34	SR 435 - Orlando	SR 434 - Longwood		2 lanes per direction
I-75	15	24	SR 826 - Miami Lakes	I-595 / SR 869 – Sunrise		Connects to Palmetto Expressway express lanes
I-95	21	34	I-395 / SR 836 – Miami	SR 842 – Fort Lauderdale		Motorcycles and registered carpools are toll-free
I-275	4.0	6.4	SR 694 - St. Petersburg	SR 687 - St. Petersburg		
I-295 (west)	4.6	7.4	I-95 - Jacksonville	SR 13 - Jacksonville		2 lanes per direction
I-295 (east)	5.9	9.5	SR 9B - Jacksonville	SR 202 - Jacksonville		2 lanes per direction
I-595	9.5	15.3	I-75 / SR 869 – Sunrise	I-95 – Fort Lauderdale		Reversible lanes
SR 618A	10.8	17.4	Channelside Drive – Tampa	SR 60 – Brandon		Reversible lanes
SR 826 (Palmetto Expressway)	9	14	West Flagler Street, Miami	NW 154th Street and I-75 - Miami		2 lanes per direction

== Georgia ==
=== Managed lanes ===
In Georgia, all vehicles in managed lanes are required to have a Peach Pass, E-Pass, E-ZPass, NC Quick Pass or SunPass to use the lanes; buses and vanpools are toll-free with a Peach Pass but not with an interoperable pass.

Road name	Length (mi)	Length (km)	Southern or western terminus	Northern or eastern terminus	Transponder tolls (automobile)	Notes
I-85 (Express Lanes)	16.0	25.7	Chamblee Tucker Road – Atlanta	Hamilton Mill Road – Buford	$0.01~$0.90 /mi	HOV 3+ (Peach Pass required); motorcycles and clean air vehicles toll-free (HOV can not be declared with partner agencies)
I-75 (South Metro Express Lanes)	12.0	19.3	I-675 – Stockbridge	SR 155 – Blacksville	$0.50 minimum to ~$0.90/mi	Reversible lanes
I-75 (Northwest Corridor Express Lanes)	15.5	24.9	I-285 – Cumberland	Hickory Grove Road – Kennesaw	$0.10 minimum/mi	Reversible lanes
I-575 (Northwest Corridor Express Lanes)	11.1	17.9	I-75 – Cumberland	Sixes Road – Holly Springs	$0.10 minimum/mi	Reversible lanes

== Illinois ==
Road name	Length (mi)	Length (km)	Southern or western terminus	Northern or eastern terminus	Cash tolls (automobile)	Notes
I-39 / I-90 / US 51 (Jane Addams Memorial Tollway)	76.0	122.3	Rockton Road (CR 9) – Roscoe	I-190 / IL 171 – Chicago	All-electronic toll (I-Pass (E-ZPass) or pay online)	Most tolls are $3.60 with cash or $1.80 with I-Pass
I-80 / I-94 / I-294 (Tri-State Tollway)	78.0	125.5	I-80 / I-94 / IL 394 – South Holland	I-41 / I-94 / US 41 – Wadsworth	All-electronic toll (I-Pass (E-ZPass) or pay online)	Most tolls are $3.60 with cash or $1.80 with I-Pass
I-88 / IL 56 / IL 110 (CKC) (Ronald Reagan Memorial Tollway)	96.0	154.5	US 30 – Rock Falls	I-290 / I-294 – Hillside	All-electronic toll (I-Pass (E-ZPass) or pay online)	Most tolls are $3.60 with cash or $1.80 with I-Pass
I-90 / Chicago Skyway	7.5	12.1	I-94 – Chicago	I-90 / Indiana Toll Road – Indiana state line	Cash or I-Pass (E-ZPass)	$8.10 for two-axles vehicles
I-355 (Veterans Memorial Tollway)	30.0	48.3	I-80 – New Lenox	Army Trail Road (CR 11) – Addison	All-electronic toll (I-Pass (E-ZPass) or pay online)	Most tolls are $3.60 with cash or $1.80 with I-Pass
IL 390 (Elgin-O'Hare Tollway)	9.8	15.8	US 20 – Hanover Park	IL 83 – Bensenville	All-electronic toll (I-Pass (E-ZPass) or pay online)	

== Indiana ==
Road name	Length (mi)	Length (km)	Southern or western terminus	Northern or eastern terminus	Cash tolls (automobile)	Notes
I-80 / I-90 / Indiana Toll Road	156.3	251.5	I-90 / Chicago Skyway – Illinois state line	I-80 / I-90 / Ohio Turnpike – Ohio state line	$16.90	Cash, E-ZPass, or I-Pass

== Kansas ==
Road name	Length (mi)	Length (km)	Southern or western terminus	Northern or eastern terminus	Cash tolls (automobile)	Notes
I-35 / I-70 / I-335 / I-470 / Kansas Turnpike	236.0	379.8	I-35 – OK state line	I-70 / US 24 / US 40 / US 69 – Kansas City	$22.72	K-Tag, Pikepass, EZ TAG, TxTag, TollTag, ExpressToll or Pay-by-Plate
US-69 (Express Lanes)	6.0	9.7	151st Street – Overland Park	I-435 / 103rd Street – Overland Park	$0.35-$1.50	K-Tag, Pikepass, EZ TAG, TxTag, TollTag, ExpressToll or Pay-by-Plate

== Louisiana ==
Road name	Length (mi)	Length (km)	Southern or western terminus	Northern or eastern terminus	Cash tolls (automobile)	Notes
LA 1 (Gateway to the Gulf Expressway)	9.0	14.5		Northern end of elevated Gateway to the Gulf Expressway	$5.40	GeauxPass or toll-by-plate

== Maine ==
Road name	Length (mi)	Length (km)	Southern or western terminus	Northern or eastern terminus	Toll rate (Class 1 automobile)	Notes
I-95 / Maine Turnpike	107.0	172.2	Piscataqua River Bridge - Kittery	US 202 / SR 11 / SR 17 / SR 100 – Augusta	$8.00 (Cash/out-of-state E-ZPass) $6.70 (Maine E-ZPass)	Cash/out-of-state E-ZPass users pay a flat fee, while tolls for Maine E-ZPass users are calculated by distance
I-495 (Falmouth Spur)	4.3	6.9	I-95/Maine Turnpike in Portland	I-295 US 1 in Falmouth	Tolled as part of mainline turnpike.	N/A

== Maryland ==
Road name	Length (mi)	Length (km)	Southern or western terminus	Northern or eastern terminus	Cash tolls (automobile)	Notes
MD 200 (Intercounty Connector)	17.5	28.2	I-370 – Gaithersburg	US 1 – Laurel	$0.40–$3.86 (E-ZPass)	All-electronic toll; allows E-ZPass and video tolling
I-895 (Harbor Tunnel Thruway)	11.44	18.41	I-95 in Elkridge	I-95 in Baltimore	$4.00 (E-ZPass) $6.00 (video tolling)	All-electronic toll

=== Managed lanes ===
Road name	Length (mi)	Length (km)	Southern or western terminus	Northern or eastern terminus	Cash tolls (automobile)	Notes
I-95 (Express Lanes)	8.0	12.9	I-895 – Baltimore	MD 43 – White Marsh	$0.70–$2.75	All-electronic toll; allows E-ZPass and video tolling

== Massachusetts ==
Road name	Length (mi)	Length (km)	Southern or western terminus	Northern or eastern terminus	Toll rate (2 axle Passenger)	Notes
I-90 / Mass Pike	138.1	222.3	I-90 / Berkshire Connector – New York state line	Route 1A – Boston	$7.45 (MA E-ZPass) $9.35 (Non MA E-ZPass) $13.55 (Pay by Plate)	All-electronic toll; allows E-ZPass and Pay by Plate

== Minnesota ==
=== Managed lanes ===
Road name	Length (mi)	Length (km)	Southern or western terminus	Northern or eastern terminus	Cash tolls (automobile)	Notes
I-35E (HOT Lanes)	12.0	19.3	Cayuga Street – St. Paul	CSAH 81 – White Bear Lake	Free-$8.00	All-electronic toll; must have E-ZPass; HOV-2+ and motorcycles are toll-free
I-35W (HOT Lanes)	16.6	26.7	I-35 – Burnsville	East 26th Street – Minneapolis	Free-$8.00	All-electronic toll; must have E-ZPass; HOV-2+ and motorcycles are toll-free
I-35W (HOT Lanes)	10.2	16.4	CSAH 23 – Roseville	CSAH 17 – Blaine	Free-$8.00	All-electronic toll; must have E-ZPass; HOV-2+ and motorcycles are toll-free
I-394 / US 12 (HOT Lanes)	11.7	18.8	CSAH 112 – Wayzata	I-94 – Minneapolis	Free-$8.00	All-electronic Toll; must have E-ZPass; HOV-2+ and motorcycles are toll-free; reversible lanes east of MN 100

== New Hampshire ==
Road name	Length (mi)	Length (km)	Southern or western terminus	Northern or eastern terminus	Toll rate (Class 1, 2 axle, single rear tires)	Notes
I-95 / Blue Star Turnpike	16	26	I-95 – Massachusetts state line	I-95 / Maine Turnpike – Maine state line	$2.00 (Cash/Non NH E-ZPass) $1.40 (NH E-ZPass)	NH E-ZPass customers get a 30% discount at ramp and mainline booths; operates as all-electronic tolling (cash not accepted) from 10 pm to 6 am as of April 9, 2021
I-93 / I-293 / US 3 / Everett Turnpike	39	63	US 3 – Massachusetts state line	I-93 / NH 9 – Concord	$2.00 (Cash/Non NH E-ZPass/Pay-by-Plate) $1.40 (NH E-ZPass)	Bedford toll plaza is EZ-Pass or Pay-by-Plate. Cash collection ended January 8, 2026. Hooksett toll plazas accept cash (6am-10pm only) and EZ-Pass.
NH 16 / Spaulding Turnpike	33	53	I-95 / US 1 Byp. – Portsmouth	NH 16 – Milton	$1.50 (Tolls by Mail/Non NH E-ZPass) $1.06 (NH E-ZPass)	NH E-ZPass customers get a 30% discount at Dover and Rochester plazas. Tolls by Mail or E-ZPass on the entire length, cash collection ended on 17–18 October 2022.

== New Jersey ==
On the New Jersey Turnpike, peak hours are from 7:00-9:00 a.m; 4:30-6:30 p.m. Monday-Friday (based on time of entry) and at all times on weekends.

Road name	Length (mi)	Length (km)	Southern or western terminus	Northern or eastern terminus	Toll rate (automobile)	Notes
A.C. Expressway (Atlantic City Expressway)	44.2	71.1	Route 42 – Washington Township	Baltic Avenue – Atlantic City	$7.31 (E-ZPass) $14.62 (Toll-by-Plate) $4.71 (ACX Plan)	E-ZPass or Toll-by-Plate
G.S. Parkway (Garden State Parkway)	172.4	277.5	Route 109 – Lower Township	Garden State Parkway Connector – New York state line	$11.94 (E-ZPass) $12.65 (cash)	Cash or E-ZPass
I-95 / N.J. Turnpike	117.2	188.6	I-295 / US 40 – Pennsville Township	I-95 / US 46 – Ridgefield Park	Exit 1 - 16W: $14.41 (NJ E-ZPass off-peak) $19.21 (E-ZPass) $19.30 (cash) Exit 1 - 18W: $15.93 (NJ E-ZPass off-peak) $21.24 (E-ZPass) $21.35 (cash)	Cash or E-ZPass
I-95 / Pearl Harbor Extension	5.33	8.58	I-95 / Penna Turnpike – PA state line	I-95 / N.J. Turnpike – Mansfield Township		Cash or E-ZPass
I-78 / Newark Bay Extension	7.56	12.17	I-95 / N.J. Turnpike – Newark	I-78 / Route 139 – Jersey City	$2.85 (NJ E-ZPass off-peak) $3.80 (E-ZPass) $3.95 (cash)	Cash or E-ZPass
Ocean Drive	50.08	80.60	Dead end in Cape May Point	Maine Avenue in Atlantic City	$2.50	E-ZPass or Toll-by-Plate; all toll gantries are located on the bridges that it crosses

== New York ==
Road name	Length (mi)	Length (km)	Southern or western terminus	Northern or eastern terminus	Toll rate (Class 2L)	Notes
I-95 (New England Thruway)	13.81	22.23	Pelham Parkway – New York	I-95 – CT state line	$1.66 (NY E-ZPass) $1.91 (Non NY E-ZPass) $2.16 (Tolls by Mail)	E-ZPass or Tolls by Mail; collected in the northbound direction only
I-90 / Berkshire Connector	24.3	39.1	I-87 / New York Thruway – Coeymans	I-90 – MA state line	$0.62 (NY E-ZPass) $0.71 (Non NY E-ZPass) $0.85 (Tolls by Mail)	E-ZPass or Tolls by Mail; toll is added on for exits B1-B3 for any trip on the closed toll system that includes crossing the Castleton-on-Hudson Bridge
I-87 / I-90 / I-287 / New York Thruway	496.0	798.2	I-87 – Yonkers	I-90 – PA state line	$17.50~$21.59 (NY E-ZPass) $20.14~$24.85 (Non NY E-ZPass) $22.76~$28.08 (Tolls By Mail)	E-ZPass or Tolls by Mail
NY 431 (Whiteface Mountain Veterans Memorial Highway)	7.96	12.81	NY 86 Willmington	Summit of Whiteface Mountain	Fee	Tolls serve an entrance fee
NY 917A (Prospect Mountain Veterans Memorial Highway)	5.88	9.46	NY 9N	Peak of Prospect Mountain	$0.00	Tolls serve an entrance fee

=== Congestion Pricing Zone ===
All roads in Manhattan south of and including 60th Street, except the West Side Highway (NY-9A) and FDR Drive, are subject to congestion tolling. Tolls collected via EZ-Pass or pay-by-plate. Cost for passenger cars is $9 during peak hours and $2.25 off peak.

== North Carolina ==
In North Carolina, the NC Quick Pass transponder is accepted and the E-ZPass, Peach Pass, and SunPass transponders are compatible. A Bill by Mail option is available to those without a transponder.

Road name	Length (mi)	Length (km)	Southern or western terminus	Northern or eastern terminus	Cash tolls (automobile)	Notes
NC 540 / NC 885 (Triangle Expressway)	32.4	52.1	I-40 / I-885 – Durham	I-40 / I-42 – Garner	$8.50 (NC Quick Pass) $17.00 (Bill by Mail)	
US 74 Byp. (Monroe Expressway)	18.7	30.1	US 74 – Stallings	US 74 – Wingate	$2.96 (NC Quick Pass) $5.92 (Bill by Mail)	

=== Managed lanes ===
Road name	Length (mi)	Length (km)	Southern or western terminus	Northern or eastern terminus	Cash tolls (automobile)	Notes
I-77 (Express Lanes)	26.0	41.8	I-277 / NC 16 – Charlotte	NC 150 – Mooresville	$2.45~$70.45	HOV 3+ and motorcycles toll-free with a NC Quick Pass transponder declared as HOV 3+ on mobile app, or E-ZPass Flex transponder set to HOV mode
I-485 (Express Lanes)	16.6	26.7	US 74 – Matthews	I-77 / US 21 – Charlotte	$2.70~$7.35 (NC Quick Pass) $5.40~$14.70 (Bill by Mail)	Vehicles more than 22 feet (6.7 m) or with a single-axle trailer pay two times the posted or invoice rate

== Nevada ==
Road name	Length (mi)	Length (km)	Southern or western terminus	Northern or eastern terminus	Cash tolls (automobile)	Notes
Valley of Fire Road	23.5	37.8	I-15 – Crystal / Moapa River Indian Reservation	Northshore Road in Lake Mead Nat'l Rec Area	$10.00	Tolls is a entrance fee for Valley of Fire State Park.
Northshore Road and Lakeshore Road	59.0	95.0	US 93 Boulder City	SR 169 Overton	$25.00	Tolls is a entrance fee for Lake Mead National Recreation Area.

== Ohio ==
Road name	Length (mi)	Length (km)	Southern or western terminus	Northern or eastern terminus	Cash tolls (automobile)	Notes
I-76 / I-80 / I-90 / Ohio Turnpike	241.3	388.3	I-80 / I-90 / Indiana Toll Road – Indiana state line	I-76 / Penna Turnpike – Pennsylvania state line	$23.50 (eastbound) $27.75 (westbound)	Cash or E-ZPass

== Oklahoma ==
Road name	Length (mi)	Length (km)	Southern or western terminus	Northern or eastern terminus	Cash tolls (automobile)	Notes
I-44 / H.E. Bailey Turnpike	86.4	139.0	US 70 – Randlett	US 62 / US 277 – Newcastle	$12.61 (PlatePay) $5.89 (Pikepass)	Pikepass, ExpressToll, K-tag, TollTag or Pay by Mail
I-44 / Turner Turnpike	88.0	141.6	I-35 / I-44 / Kilpatrick Turnpike – Oklahoma City	SH-66 – Tulsa	$10.50 (PlatePay) $5.40 (Pikepass)	Pikepass, ExpressToll, K-tag, TollTag or Pay by Mail
I-44 / Will Rogers Turnpike	88.5	142.4	I-44 / US 412 / SH-364 / Creek Turnpike – Fair Oaks	I-44 – Missouri state line	$10.50 (PlatePay) $5.40 (Pikepass)	Pikepass, ExpressToll, K-tag, TollTag or Pay by Mail
US 412 / Cherokee Turnpike	32.8	52.8	US 412 Alt. – Locust Grove	US 59 / US 412 Alt. – West Siloam Springs	$6.27 (PlatePay) $3.08 (Pikepass)	Pikepass, ExpressToll, K-tag, TollTag or Pay by Mail
US 412 / Cimarron Turnpike	67.0	107.8	I-35 / US 64 – Perry	US 64 / SH-48 – Westport	$8.20 (PlatePay) $3.65 (Pikepass)	Pikepass, ExpressToll, K-tag, TollTag or Pay by Mail
Chickasaw Turnpike	13.3	21.4	US 177 – Sulphur	SH-1 – Roff	$1.65 (PlatePay) $0.72 (Pikepass)	Pikepass, ExpressToll, K-Tag, TollTag or Pay by Mail; super two
Indian Nation Turnpike	105.2	169.3	US 70 / US 271 – Hugo	I-40 – Henryetta	$16.74 (PlatePay) $7.31 (Pikepass)	Pikepass, ExpressToll, K-tag, TollTag or Pay by Mail
I-335 / Kickapoo Turnpike	21.0	33.8	SE 89th Street – Oklahoma City	I-44 – Luther	$4.74 (PlatePay) $2.28 (Pikepass)	Pikepass, ExpressToll, K-tag, TollTag or Pay by Mail
I-344 / Kilpatrick Turnpike	29.4	47.3	SH 152 – Oklahoma City	I-35 / I-44 / Turner Turnpike – Oklahoma City	$7.98 (PlatePay) $3.84 (Pikepass)	Pikepass, ExpressToll, K-tag, TollTag or Pay by Mail
Muskogee Turnpike	53.1	85.5	SH-364 / Creek Turnpike – Broken Arrow	I-40 – Webbers Falls	$8.06 (PlatePay) $3.80 (Pikepass)	Pikepass, ExpressToll, K-tag, TollTag or Pay by Mail
Creek Turnpike	32.2	51.8	I-44 / Turner Turnpike – Sapulpa	I-44 / US 412 / Will Rogers Turnpike – Fair Oaks	$7.72 (PlatePay) $3.46 (Pikepass)	Pikepass, ExpressToll, K-tag, TollTag or Pay by Mail

== Pennsylvania ==
Road name	Length (mi)	Length (km)	Southern or western terminus	Northern or eastern terminus	Cash tolls (automobile)	Notes
I-376 (Beaver Valley Expressway)	16.0	25.7	US 422 – Union Township	PA 51 – Chippewa Township	$9.66 (Toll by Plate) $4.83 (E-ZPass)	All-electronic toll; allows E-ZPass and Toll by Plate
PA Turnpike 43 (Mon–Fayette Expressway)	52.0	83.7	WV 43 – WV state line	PA 51 – Jefferson Hills	$22.52 (Toll by Plate) $10.52 (E-ZPass)	All-electronic toll; allows E-ZPass and Toll by Plate; partially completed; rest of highway pending due to funding limitations
PA Turnpike 66 (Amos K. Hutchinson Bypass)	14.0	22.5	I-70 / I-76 / Penna Turnpike / US 119 – New Stanton	US 22 – Delmont	$6.36 (Toll by Plate) $3.18 (E-ZPass)	All-electronic toll; allows E-ZPass and Toll by Plate
PA Turnpike 576 (Southern Beltway)	19.2	30.9	I-376 – Findlay Township, PIT	I-79 – Cecil Township	$9.84 (Toll by Plate) $4.95 (E-ZPass)	All-electronic toll; allows E-ZPass and Toll by Plate; extension to Mon-Fayette Expressway planned
I-76 / I-95 / I-276 / Penna Turnpike	359.6	578.7	I-76 / Ohio Turnpike – Ohio state line	I-95 / Pearl Harbor Memorial Extension – New Jersey state line	$125.72 (Toll by Plate) $62.76 (E-ZPass)	All-electronic toll; allows E-ZPass and Toll by Plate
I-476 / Penna Turnpike NE Extension	112.0	180.2	I-276 / Penna Turnpike – Plymouth Township	I-81 / US 6 / US 11 – Clarks Summit	$38.88 (Toll by Plate) $19.44 (E-ZPass)	All-electronic toll; allows E-ZPass and Toll by Plate
Mosey Wood Toll Road	2.5	4.0	Mosey Wood Road - Lake Harmony	PA 940 - Kidder Twp.		Private road. Cash only.

== Puerto Rico ==
Road name	Length (km)	Length (mi)	Southern or western terminus	Northern or eastern terminus	Cash tolls (automobile)	Notes
PR-5 (Río Hondo Expressway)	3.5	2.2	PR-2 – Bayamón	PR-22 – Cataño	$0.35	All-electronic toll (AutoExpreso)
PR-20 (Rafael Martínez Nadal Expressway)	9.5	5.9	PR-1 – Guaynabo	PR-2 – Guaynabo	$0.50	All-electronic toll (AutoExpreso)
PR-22 (José de Diego Expressway)	84.0	52.2	PR-2 – Hatillo	PR-26 – San Juan	$5.50	All-electronic toll (AutoExpreso)
PR-52 (Luis A. Ferré Tollway)	108.0	67.1	PR-2 – Ponce	PR-1 / PR-18 – Río Piedras	$6.70	All-electronic toll (AutoExpreso)
PR-53 (Dr. José Celso Barbosa Tollway)	95.0	59.0	PR-52 – Salinas	PR-3 – Fajardo	$4.50	All-electronic toll (AutoExpreso)
PR-66 (Roberto Sánchez Vilella Tollway)	20.0	12.4	PR-26 – Carolina	PR-3 – Río Grande	$4.00	All-electronic toll (AutoExpreso)

=== Managed lanes ===
Road name	Length (km)	Length (mi)	Southern or western terminus	Northern or eastern terminus	Cash tolls (automobile)	Notes
PR-22 (Dynamic Toll Lanes)	12.0	7.5	PR-165 – Toa Baja	PR-5 – Bayamón	$0.50~$6.00	All-electronic toll; reversible lanes are being converted into DTLs
PR-18; PR-52 (Dynamic Toll Lanes)	14.0	8.7	PR-1 – San Juan	PR-30 – Caguas	$0.50~$6.00	All-electronic toll; reversible lanes are being converted into DTLs

== Rhode Island ==
Due to a federal ruling by U.S. District Judge William Smith on September 21, 2022, at 11 am, all truck tolls were deactivated statewide by the Rhode Island Department of Transportation at 7 pm on that day.

Road name	Length (mi)	Length (km)	Southern or western terminus	Northern or eastern terminus	E-ZPass/Pay by Plate tolls (Class 8-13)	Notes
I-95	43.3	69.7	I-95 – Connecticut state line	I-95 – Massachusetts state line	$2.50~$17.75	Tolls for tractor or truck trailers defined in 23 C.F.R 658.5, pulling trailer(s) (Class 8-13). No toll for passenger vehicles, motorcycles, buses, and light trucks (Class 1-7). All-electronic toll; E-ZPass and Toll by Plate
I-195	4.3	6.9	I-95 – Providence	I-195 – Massachusetts state line	$9.50	Tolls for tractor or truck trailers defined in 23 C.F.R 658.5, pulling trailer(s) (Class 8-13). No toll for passenger vehicles, motorcycles, buses, and light trucks (Class 1-7). All-electronic toll; E-ZPass and Toll by Plate
I-295	23.5	37.8	I-95 – Warwick	I-295 – Massachusetts state line	$6.50~$22.50	Tolls for tractor or truck trailers defined in 23 C.F.R 658.5, pulling trailer(s) (Class 8-13). No toll for passenger vehicles, motorcycles, buses, and light trucks (Class 1-7). All-electronic toll; E-ZPass and Toll by Plate
US 6	26.5	42.6	US 6 – Connecticut state line	US 6 – Massachusetts state line	$5.00	Tolls for tractor or truck trailers defined in 23 C.F.R 658.5, pulling trailer(s) (Class 8-13). No toll for passenger vehicles, motorcycles, buses, and light trucks (Class 1-7). All-electronic toll; E-ZPass and Toll by Plate
Route 146	16.24	26.14	I-95 – Providence	Route 146 – Massachusetts state line	$3.50~$10.25	Tolls for tractor or truck trailers defined in 23 C.F.R 658.5, pulling trailer(s) (Class 8-13). No toll for passenger vehicles, motorcycles, buses, and light trucks (Class 1-7). All-electronic toll; E-ZPass and Toll by Plate

== South Carolina ==
Road name	Length (mi)	Length (km)	Southern or western terminus	Northern or eastern terminus	Cash tolls (automobile)	Notes
I-185 (Southern Connector)	16.0	25.7	I-385 – Mauldin	I-85 / US 29 – Greenville	$6.00	Cash or PAL PASS

== South Dakota ==
Road name	Length (mi)	Length (km)	Southern or western terminus	Northern or eastern terminus	Cash tolls (automobile)	Notes
SD 240 (Badlands Loop Road)	28.0	45.1	Wall	Cactus Flat	$30.00	Toll is entrance fee for Badlands National Park. No cash.

== Texas ==
Road name	Length (mi)	Length (km)	Southern or western terminus	Northern or eastern terminus	Cash tolls (automobile)	Notes
I-169 / SH 550 Toll	0.5	0.80	FM 511 - Brownsville	I-69E / US 77 / US 83 / FM 511 - Olmito	Minimum $0.50 to maximum $2.50 (EZ TAG, TxTAG, and TollTag); minimum $0.67 to maximum $3.35 (Pay by Mail)	All-electronic toll
183 Toll Road	6.7	10.8	US 183 - Austin	US 183 / SH 71 - Austin	$0.59~$1.84	All-electronic toll; allows EZ TAG, TxTag, TollTag, and Pay by Mail
183A Toll Road	11.6	18.7	US 183 south/ SH 45 Toll east/ RM 620 – Austin	US 183 – Cedar Park	$3.08 (EZ TAG, TxTag, and TollTag) $4.10 (Pay by Mail)	All-electronic toll
Chisholm Trail Parkway	27.6	44.4	US 67 – Cleburne	I-30 – Fort Worth	$5.19 (EZ TAG, TxTag, and TollTag) $7.79 (Pay by Mail)	All-electronic toll
Dallas North Tollway	32	51	I-35E – Dallas	US 380 – Frisco	$5.15 (EZ TAG, TxTag, and TollTag) $7.73 (Pay by Mail)	All-electronic toll
Fort Bend Parkway Toll Road	10.1	16.3	Sienna Parkway	US 90 Alt. east (South Main Street)	$3.51 (with valid tag) $4.66 (without valid tag)	EZ TAG, TxTag, or TollTag required
Hardy Toll Road	21.6	34.8	I-610	I-45	$3.00 ($2.70 with EZ TAG discount)	EZ TAG, TxTag, or TollTag required
Hardy Toll Road Connector to George Bush Intercontinental Airport	4	6.4	Hardy Toll Road	John F. Kennedy Boulevard	$1.20 ($1.08 with EZ TAG discount)	EZ TAG, TxTag, or TollTag required
Spur 97 (International Parkway)	6.0	9.7	Spur 97 – Fort Worth	SH 114 / SH 121 – Grapevine	Depends on time spent in airport; toll for simple pass through (< 8 minutes) is $4.00; between 8 and 30 minutes, toll is $2.00	Credit Card or TollTag
Loop 1 Toll (MoPac Expressway)	3.8	6.1	Loop 1 / FM 734 – Austin	SH 45 Toll – Round Rock	Maximum toll: $1.07 TollTag, TxTag, and EZ TAG or $1.41 Mail	All-electronic toll; toll includes passage along SH 45 between Loop 1 and I-35
Beltway 8 / Sam Houston Tollway	91	146	I-45	I-69 / US 59	$12.00 ($10.80 with EZ TAG discount)	All-electronic toll; northeast section from I-69 / US 59 to US 90, Sam Houston Ship Channel Bridge and some ramps require EZ TAG, TxTag, or TollTag
Loop 49 Toll	26.3	42.3	I-20	SH 110	$3.96 (EZ TAG, TxTag, and TollTag) $5.26 (Pay by Mail)	All-electronic toll
Pres. George Bush Turnpike	51.5	82.9	I-20 – Grand Prairie	I-30 / US 67 – Rowlett	$8.83 (EZ TAG, TxTag, and TollTag) $13.26 (Pay by Mail)	All-electronic toll; two branches connected by SH 161
Sam Rayburn Tollway	26	42	SH 121 / SH 114 – Coppell	US 75 / SH 5 / Spur 399 – McKinney	$4.04 (EZ TAG, TxTag, and TollTag) $6.06 (Pay by Mail)	All-electronic toll
SH 45 Toll	11.5	18.5	US 183 / RM 620 – Cedar Park	I-35 – Buda	$2.14 (EZ TAG, TxTag, and TollTag) $2.84 (Pay by Mail)	All-electronic toll
SH 45 Toll SW	3.6	5.8	Loop 1 – Austin	FM 1626 – Manchaca	EZ TAG, TxTag, TollTag, or Pay By Mail	All-electronic toll
71 Toll Lanes	4	6.4	Presidential Boulevard Austin	SH 130 – Austin	EZ TAG, TxTag, TollTag, or Pay By Mail	All-electronic toll
SH 99 Toll (Grand Parkway) in Fort Bend County	12.2	19.6	I-69 / US 59	FM 1093 / Westpark Tollway	$3.52 (with valid tag) $5.52 (without tag)	EZ TAG, TxTag, or TollTag required; non-toll traffic must use the "last free exit" to bypass toll gantries
SH 99 Toll (Grand Parkway) in Harris, Montgomery, Liberty, and Chambers Counties	104.7	168.5	I-10 / US 90 – Katy	SH 146 – Baytown	Maximum toll: $24.64	All-electronic toll
SH 130 Toll (Pickle Parkway)	86	138	I-10 – Seguin	I-35 – Georgetown	$14.47 (EZ TAG, TxTag, and TollTag) $19.23 (Pay by Mail)	All-electronic toll
SH 249 Toll / Tomball Tollway	25.0	40.2	Spring Cypress Road	FM 1774 north of Todd Mission	$7.11 (EZ TAG, TxTag, and TollTag) $9.45 (Pay by Mail)	All-electronic toll; EZ TAG, TxTag, or TollTag required between Spring Cypress Road and FM 1774 in Pinehurst
290 Toll Road	6.2	10.0	US 183 / US 290 - Austin	US 290 / FM 734 - Manor	$0.60~$1.82	All-electronic toll; allows EZ TAG, TollTag, TxTag, and Pay by Mail
SH 360 Toll	9.7	15.6	US 287 - Mansfield	Camp Wisdom Road/Sublett Road - Grand Prairie	$0.29~$1.76	All-electronic toll; allows EZ TAG, TollTag, TxTag, and Pay by Mail
Westpark Tollway	22.7	36.5	FM 1093	Westpark Drive	Maximum toll: $5.07 (with valid tag); $6.12 (without valid tag)	TollTag, TxTag, or EZ TAG required

=== Managed lanes ===
Road name	Length (mi)	Length (km)	Southern or western terminus	Northern or eastern terminus	Cash tolls (automobile)	Notes
I-10 (Katy Tollway)	12.0	19.3	SH 6 – Houston	I-610 – Houston	$1.00~$7.00	All-electronic toll; must have EZ TAG or TxTag; HOV-2+ and motorcycles toll-free during HOV hours
I-30	18.0	29.0	Center Street - Arlington	Sylvan Avenue - Dallas	Variable toll pricing	All-electronic toll; allows EZ TAG, TxTag, and TollTag, and Pay by Mail HOV-2+ and motorcycles receive discount during HOV hours; EZ TAG, TollTag, or TxTag required for HOV discounts
I-35E	19.6	31.5	Loop 12 - Dallas	FM 2181 - Lake Dallas	Variable toll pricing	All-electronic toll; allows EZ TAG, TxTag, and TollTag, and Pay by Mail HOV-2+ and motorcycles receive discount during HOV hours; EZ TAG, TollTag, or TxTag required for HOV discounts
I-35W	16.8	27.0	I-30 - Fort Worth	Eagle Parkway - Fort Worth	Variable toll pricing	All-electronic toll; allows EZ TAG, TxTag, and TollTag, and Pay by Mail HOV-2+ and motorcycles receive discount during HOV hours; EZ TAG, TollTag, or TxTag required for HOV discounts
Loop 12	2.5	4.0	SH 183 - Irving	I-35E - Dallas	Variable toll pricing	All-electronic toll; allows EZ TAG, TxTag, and TollTag, and Pay by Mail HOV-2+ and motorcycles receive discount during HOV hours; EZ TAG, TollTag, or TxTag required for HOV discounts
SH 114	14.5	23.3	SH 26 - Grapevine	SH 183 - Irving	Variable toll pricing	All-electronic toll; allows EZ TAG, TxTag, and TollTag, and Pay by Mail HOV-2+ and motorcycles receive discount during HOV hours; EZ TAG, TollTag, or TxTag required for HOV discounts
SH 121	6.9	11.1	I-820 - Hurst	Murphy Drive - Bedford	Variable toll pricing	All-electronic toll; allows EZ TAG, TxTag, and TollTag, and Pay by Mail HOV-2+ and motorcycles receive discount during HOV hours; EZ TAG, TollTag, or TxTag required for HOV discounts
SH 183	13.7	22.0	Industrial Boulevard - Euless	Mockingbird Lane - Dallas	Variable toll pricing	All-electronic toll; allows EZ TAG, TxTag, and TollTag, and Pay by Mail HOV-2+ and motorcycles receive discount during HOV hours; EZ TAG, TollTag, or TxTag required for HOV discounts
SH 288 (Brazoria County Expressway)	15.0	24.1	County Road 58 - Manvel	I-69 / US 59 - Houston	Variable toll pricing; $3.20 – $6.90	EZ TAG, TxTag, or TollTag required
US 290			Barker Cypress Road – Cypress	I-10 / US 90 – Houston	$1.00~$7.00	
MoPac	10.8	17.4	Cesar Chavez Street - Austin	Parmer Lane – Austin	Variable toll pricing	All-electronic toll; allows EZ TAG, TxTag, TollTag, and Pay by Mail
I-635	18.4	29.6	I-35E – Dallas	Oates Drive – Dallas	$0.10~$0.75 /mi	All-electronic toll; allows EZ TAG, TxTag, TollTag, and Pay by Mail HOV-2+ and motorcycles receive discount during HOV hours; EZ TAG, TollTag, or TxTag required for HOV discount
I-820 (North Tarrant Express)	11.7	18.8	I-35W – Fort Worth	SH 121 / SH 183 – North Richland Hills	$0.10~$0.75 /mi	All-electronic toll; allows EZ TAG, TxTag, TollTag, and Pay by Mail HOV-2+ and motorcycles receive discount during HOV hours; EZ TAG, TollTag, or TxTag required for HOV discount

== Utah ==
Road name	Length (mi)	Length (km)	Southern or western terminus	Northern or eastern terminus	Cash tolls (automobile)	Notes
Adams Avenue Parkway	0.5	0.80	I-84 – South Weber	5900 South – Washington Terrace	$2.00	Privately owned and operated
SR-9 (Zion-Mount Carmel Highway)			Springdale	Mt. Carmel Junction	$35	Toll is entrance fee for Zion National Park.

=== Managed lanes ===
Road name	Length (mi)	Length (km)	Southern or western terminus	Northern or eastern terminus	Cash tolls (automobile)	Notes
I-15 (Express Lanes)	82.0	132.0	US 6 / SR-156 – Spanish Fork	SR-26 – Riverdale	$0.25~$2.00 per zone (Can be "FREE" under certain conditions, e.g. road construction.)	All-electronic toll; must have Express Pass; HOV 2+, Buses, Clean Air Pass, and motorcycles toll-free

== Vermont ==
- Equinox Mountain Skyline Drive (private, scenic)
- Burke Mountain Scenic Toll Road (private, scenic)
- Mount Mansfield toll road (private, scenic, cash only)

== Virginia ==
Road name	Length (mi)	Length (km)	Southern or western terminus	Northern or eastern terminus	Cash tolls (automobile)	Notes
SR 76 (Powhite Parkway Extension)	9.6	15.4	SR 288 – Midlothian	SR 150 – Bon Air	$0.75	Cash or E-ZPass
SR 76 (Powhite Parkway)	3.4	5.5	SR 150 – Bon Air	I-195 – Richmond	$2.00	E-ZPass or Pay-by-Plate
SR 168 (Chesapeake Expressway)	16.0	25.7	SR 168 Bus. – Chesapeake	I-64 / I-464 / US 17 – Chesapeake	$4.00~$10.00	Cash or E-ZPass
SR 195 (Downtown Expressway)	3.4	5.5	I-195 / SR 146 – Richmond	I-95 – Richmond	$2.00	E-ZPass or Pay-by-Plate
SR 267 (Dulles Greenway)	14.0	22.5	US 15 / SR 7 – Leesburg	SR 28 – Dulles Airport	$5.20~$6.10	Cash or E-ZPass
SR 267 (Dulles Toll Road)	14.0	22.5	SR 28 – Dulles Airport	SR 123 – Tysons Corner	$4.00	E-ZPass or Pay-by-Plate
SR 895 (Pocahontas Parkway)	8.5	13.7	I-95 / SR 150 – Bensley	I-295 – Varina	$3.55~$6.15	Cash or E-ZPass
Skyline Drive	105.5	169.8	US 340 near Front Royal	US 250 in Rockfish Gap	$15 for 7-day pass	No cash accepted. Toll is entry fee for Shenandoah National Park

=== Managed lanes ===
Road name	Length (mi)	Length (km)	Southern or western terminus	Northern or eastern terminus	Cash tolls (automobile)	Notes
I-64 (Express Lanes)	8.4	13.5	I-564 – Norfolk	I-264 / I-664 – Chesapeake	Variable, no maximum	All-electronic toll; must have E-ZPass; reversible lanes; HOV-2+ and motorcycles are toll-free; tolls applied 11 a.m. – 11 p.m. Monday – Friday both directions, Friday 11 p.m. – Sunday 11 a.m. eastbound, Sunday 11 a.m. – 11 p.m. westbound
I-66 (Express Lanes) (Inside the Beltway)	6.2	10.0	I-495 – Merrifield	Langston Boulevard – Arlington	Variable; no maximum	All lanes; all-electronic toll; E-ZPass only; HOV-3+ and motorcycles are toll-free; tolls applied 3–7 p.m. westbound and 5:30–9:30 a.m. eastbound Monday through Friday
I-66 (Express Lanes) (Outside the Beltway)	22.5	36.2	US 29 – Gainesville	I-495 – Merrifield	Variable; no maximum	2 lanes per direction; all-electronic toll; E-ZPass only; HOV-3+ and motorcycles are toll-free
I-95 / I-395 (Express Lanes)	47.0	75.6	US 17 – Fredericksburg	14th Street – Washington D.C.	$0.20–0.80/mi	All-electronic toll, E-ZPass only; reversible lanes, HOV-3+ and motorcycles toll-free
I-495 (Express Lanes)	14.5	23.3	George Washington Memorial Parkway-McLean	I-95/ I-395 – Springfield	$0.20–1.25/mi	All-electronic toll, E-ZPass only; HOV-3+ and motorcycles toll-free

== Washington ==
Road name	Length (mi)	Length (km)	Southern or western terminus	Northern or eastern terminus	Cash tolls (automobile)	Notes
SR 509 (Expressway)	1	1.6	I-5 – SeaTac	24th Ave South – SeaTac	$1.20~$2.40 (Time of day/day of week as indicated by electronic signage)	All-electronic toll; allows Good to Go and Pay-by-Mail; Additional $2 fee for Pay By Mail.

=== Managed lanes ===
Road name	Length (mi)	Length (km)	Southern or western terminus	Northern or eastern terminus	Cash tolls (automobile)	Notes
I-405 (Express Toll Lanes)	17	27	NE 6th Street – Bellevue	I-5/ SR 525 – Lynnwood	$1.00~$15.00 (free and open to all at night, on weekends, holidays, or as indicated by electronic signage)	All-electronic toll; allows Good to Go and Pay-by-Mail; HOV-3+/HOV-2+ (peak/off-peak) and motorcycles are toll-free with Good to Go Flex or Motorcycle Pass Additional $2 pay-by-mail fee for vehicles without Good To Go
SR 167 (HOT Lanes)	4.8	7.7	15th Street Southwest – Auburn	South 277th Street – Auburn	$1.00~$15.00 (free and open to all at night and some holidays, or as indicated by electronic signage)	All-electronic toll; must have Good to Go; HOV-2+ and Motorcycles are toll-free without a pass, with a Good to Go Flex Pass, or a Good to Go Motorcycle Pass

== West Virginia ==
Road name	Length (mi)	Length (km)	Southern or western terminus	Northern or eastern terminus	Cash tolls (automobile)	Notes
I-64 / I-77 (West Virginia Turnpike)	95.5	153.7	I-77 / US 460 – Princeton	I-64 / I-77 / US 60 – Charleston	$13.50 (3 toll plazas, $4.50 each)	Cash or E-ZPass

== Wyoming ==
Road name	Length (mi)	Length (km)	Southern or western terminus	Northern or eastern terminus	Cash tolls (automobile)	Notes
US 89 / US 191 / US 287 (John D. Rockefeller Jr. Memorial Parkway)	21.0	33.8	US 26 at Moran Junction	North Boundary of Grand Teton National Park	$35.00	7-Day for every Entrance Pass; tolls serve as an entrance fee for Grand Teton National Park.

== Former ==
=== Alabama ===
- Foley Beach Express - tolls removed May 23, 2024.

=== Colorado ===
- US 36 (Denver–Boulder Turnpike) — tolls removed in 1967

=== Connecticut ===
- Connecticut Turnpike — tolls removed in 1985
- Route 15 (Merritt Parkway/Wilbur Cross Parkway) — tolls removed in 1988

=== Georgia ===
- F.J. Torras Causeway – 30¢ tolls removed in 2003
- Georgia State Route 400— 50¢ tolls removed in 2013

=== Kentucky ===
- Audubon Parkway — tolls removed in 2006; currently signed as "Future I-69 Spur".
- Bluegrass Parkway — tolls removed in 1991
- Cumberland Parkway — tolls removed in 2003
- Hal Rogers Parkway — tolls removed in 2003
- Kentucky Turnpike — tolls removed in 1975, always had been part of I-65
- Mountain Parkway — tolls removed in 1986
- William H. Natcher Parkway — tolls removed in 2006; mostly now designated as I-165, with a small section as KY 9007
- Pennyrile Parkway — tolls removed in 1992; now designated as I-69, I-169, and US 41
- Purchase Parkway — tolls removed in 1992; about half of the route is now designated as I-69, with the rest to follow in the coming years
- Western Kentucky Parkway — tolls removed in 1987; easternmost 38 miles (61 km) of the road is now designated as I-69; the next 38 miles (61 km) to the east will be designated as I-569 in the coming years

=== Maryland ===
- John F. Kennedy Memorial Highway — ramp tolls removed in the 1980s; Tydings Bridge toll remains

=== New York ===
- Cross County Parkway — tolls removed in the early 1950s
- Hutchinson River Parkway — tolls removed in 1994
- Niagara Thruway – tolls removed in 2006; tolls on Grand Island Bridges remain
- Saw Mill River Parkway — tolls removed in 1994
- Southern State Parkway — tolls removed in 1978

=== Oregon ===
- Barlow Road — tolls in effect from 1864 to 1919; no longer a viable route due to the eastern portion being overgrown; most western portions are paved over by modern roads
- Santiam Wagon Road — tolls in effect from 1861 to 1915; closely parallels the route of U.S. Route 20 through the Cascades

=== South Carolina ===
- Cross Island Pkwy (Hilton Head Island)—tolls removed in June 2021.

=== Texas ===
- Highway 255 (Camino Colombia Toll Road) — tolls removed in 2017
- Dallas-Fort Worth Turnpike — tolls removed in 1978

=== Virginia ===
- Norfolk–Virginia Beach Expressway — tolls removed in 1996.
- Richmond–Petersburg Turnpike — tolls removed in 1992

== Proposals ==
=== California ===
In the San Francisco Bay Area, the transportation authorities are planning a whole network of HOT lanes.

- US 101 planned. The areas to be constructed include the total area of the Metropolitan Transportation Commission (San Francisco Bay Area) (MTC), with the exception of the City of San Francisco, the northern approach to the Golden Gate Bridge, and northern San Mateo County.
- I-80 planned. The areas to be constructed include the total MTC area, with the exception of the City of San Francisco, and the approach to the San Francisco–Oakland Bay Bridge.
- SR 4 planned, portions fully funded. The areas to be constructed are from the junction with I-680 to Antioch.
- I-880 planned, portions fully funded. The areas to be constructed go from the south end of Oakland to the junction with US 101.
- SR 92 convert lanes from HOV. The area to be converted is the approach to the San Mateo - Hayward Bridge.
- SR 84 convert lanes from HOV. The area to be converted is from the I-880 intersection to the approach to the Dumbarton Bridge.
- I-280 planned. The areas to be constructed go from the intersection with US 101/I-680 in San Jose to past the intersection with SR 85.
- SR 85 fully funded. The area to be constructed is the entire length with both ends connecting with US 101. Expected to open in 2012.
- SR 87 convert lanes from HOV. The area to be converted is its entire length, from US 101 to SR 85.
- SR 237 extension of already-existing HOT lanes. The area to be constructed is the entire length from I-880 to SR 85. The portion from I-880 and North First St opened in March 2012.

Riverside County is recognized by the California Transportation Commission (CATC) as having a traffic congestion problem second only to Los Angeles.

- SR 91 under construction. Two HOT lanes and a mixed-flow lane from the Orange County line to the intersection with I-15.
- I-15 recommended. Two HOT lanes and a mixed-flow lane from the San Bernardino County line to the intersection with SR 74. Further, an HOV lane and an eventual HOT lane extension to the San Diego County line.

Los Angeles County has a plan in place that has been approved by the California legislature. They have received a grant for $213.6 million from the USDOT (United States Department of Transportation). This plan will be implemented in two phases, although it is currently unknown when those phases will take place.

Both phases are for the conversion of HOV lanes to HOT lanes.

- I-10 phase 2: From I-605 to SR 57/SR 71: in design; from SR-57/SR-71 to the San Bernardino County line.
- I-210 phase 1: Convert the Foothill Freeway from SR 134/SR 710 to I-605. Phase 2: From I-605 to the San Bernardino County line. This plan was dropped as of 2009, according to the Pasadena Star-News, due to San Gabriel Valley leaders opposition.
- SR 60 phase 2: Convert from the intersection with I-605 to Brea Canyon (under construction), and convert from Brea Canyon to the San Bernardino County line.

SR 11 phase 2: Connect the current terminus to the Otay Mesa East Port of Entry

=== Florida ===
- SR 23 (First Coast Expressway)—planned 46.5-mile (74.8 km) southwest bypass of the Jacksonville metro area, from I-10 to I-95. A 15-mile (24 km) segment was completed in 2016. The remaining segment is under design, but not yet scheduled for construction.
- SR 516 (Lake-Orange Expressway)—planned 4.4-mile (7.1 km) connector between Lake and Orange Counties, from US-27 to SR-429. First segment is slated to open in 2026.
- SR 690 (Gateway Expressway)—elevated east–west highway in central Pinellas County. Project approved in 2014. Construction began in 2017 & was completed in 2024.
- Central Polk Parkway—planned, unfunded toll road in Polk County. As of January 2015, the design phase of seven of eight segments has been funded.
- Heartland Parkway—proposed 110-mile (180 km) toll road through interior counties, from southwest of the Orlando metro area to the Fort Myers-Naples area.

==== Managed lanes ====
- I-4 (I-4 Ultimate/ Beyond the Ultimate/ Moving I-4 Forward)—a 21-mile (34 km) four-lane variable tolling lanes along I-4 in Orlando, was completed in 2021. Additional 40 miles (64 km) of variable toll lanes along I-4 currently being studied, which would cover the Orlando metropolitan area.
- I-75/ SR 826 (Palmetto Expressway)—Express lanes are being added along 28 miles (45 km) of I-75 and SR 826 in the Miami area; work began in 2014 and was completed in 2018.
- Turnpike—Thru lanes are being added to 20 miles (32 km) of the Turnpike through Miami-Dade County.
- I-295—Express lanes are being added between I-95 and the St. John's River (Buckman Bridge). Plans for express lanes between State Road 9B and J. Turner Butler Boulevard are being finalized with land acquisition beginning in 2015.
- I-4/ I-75/ I-275—FDOT has proposed constructing a system of express lanes—Tampa Bay Express—along Interstates 275, 4, & 75 in the Tampa Bay area.

=== Georgia ===
- I-285, along the northern section of I-285 between the two interchanges with I-20, although it is to be built in three sections:
  - West side - between I-75 and I-20 west of Atlanta
  - Top end - between I-75 and I-85 north of Atlanta, including direct interchanges with I-75, GA 400, and I-85
  - East side - between I-85 and I-20 east of Atlanta
- GA 400, from I-285 going north about 16 miles.

=== Hawaii ===
- Hana Highway (Hawaii Route 360) - a bill has been proposed in the state legislature that would direct the state DOT to study feasibility of tolling a section of this highway between MP 32 and MP40 to help manage heavy tourist use. Under the proposal, residents would be exempt from the toll.

=== Illinois ===
- I-490 (O'Hare West Bypass)—this beltway and electronic toll highway should be completed by 2027.

=== Kentucky ===
- Mountain Parkway—Currently toll-free, but tolling has been proposed to pay for plans to expand the current two-lane section from Campton to Salyersville to four lanes, plus extend the road to Prestonsburg.

=== Louisiana ===
- Lafayette Regional Xpressway—proposed toll road.
- Baton Rouge Loop—proposed toll road.

=== Minnesota ===
MnDOT plans to continue their construction of E-ZPass Express Lanes across the Twin Cities including:

- I-94
- I-494
- US-169
- MN-36
- MN-77
- MN-252

=== North Carolina ===
- I‑485 (Express Lanes)—along the Governor James G. Martin Freeway section of I-485, between US 74 (exit 51) and I-77/US 21 (exit 67), in Mecklenburg County. Expected to open in early 2026.
- US 74 (Express Lanes)—along the Independence Boulevard section of US 74, between Brookshire Freeway/John Belk Freeway and Wallace Lane, in Mecklenburg County. The project involves converting existing Bus lanes.
- NC 540 (Triangle Expressway Extension)— Phase 1 opened in September 2024. Phase 2 construction started Summer 2024. It is expected to finish in 2028.
- I-77 (Express Lanes) - Proposed 11 mile southern extension from I-277 to the South Carolina state line.

=== Oregon ===
- I-5 — replacement for Interstate Bridge between Portland, Oregon, and Vancouver, Washington.
- I-205 — from Stafford Road to Oregon Route 213, including the Abernethy Bridge. Proposed to begin as early as 2024.

=== Rhode Island ===
- Interstate 295 (Trucks only)

=== Texas ===
- Cibolo Parkway – proposed F.M. 1103 extension as a toll road south from Weil Road south to I-10 at Zuehl Road in Cibolo, TX (Guadalupe County).
- I-10 (Katy Tollway)—proposed extension of the I-10 HOT lanes, from SH 6 in Harris County to FM 359 in Waller County (under study).
- I-35E (Express Lanes)—planned variable toll lanes, from south of the Loop 12/I-35E split to south of Valwood Parkway, including the reconstruction of existing facilities, construction of frontage roads and the addition of managed lanes.
- I-35W (Express Lanes)—planned variable toll lanes, from Wautauga Avenue to Meacham Street in Fort Worth.
- I-69E—proposed toll road segments located at Riviera and Driscoll.
- Loop 360—proposed future designation of state highway, in Austin.
- Loop 1604 (Express Lanes)—proposed variable tolling lanes in San Antonio.
- SH 45 (Manchaca Expressway)—planned toll road extension.
- SH 71 (Bastrop Expressway)—proposed toll road in Austin.
- SH 121/ SH 183 (North Tarrant Express)—proposed improvements are planned to include three general purpose lanes in each direction with three HOT lanes in each direction for a total of twelve lanes with frontage roads for future traffic volumes, located in the Fort Worth area.
- US 281 (Express Lanes)—proposed variable tolling lanes in San Antonio.
- US 290/SH 71 (Oak Hill Expressway)—proposed toll road or variable toll lanes along Oak Hill Expressway, in Austin.

=== Washington ===
- I‑405/ SR 167—proposed extension of the SR 167 HOT Lanes and I-405 Express Toll Lanes, from Auburn to Bellevue

=== West Virginia ===
- WV 43 (Mon–Fayette Expressway)—currently free on West Virginia portion, but West Virginia reserves the right to impose tolls on its section of the Mon–Fayette Expressway in the future, much like its Pennsylvania counterpart.

== Jurisdictions without toll roads ==
(Toll bridges and toll tunnels that carry roads are not included.)

As of December 2025:

- Alaska
- American Samoa
- Arizona
- Arkansas
- Connecticut
- Georgia
- Guam
- Hawaii
- Idaho
- Iowa
- Kentucky
- Michigan
- Mississippi
- Missouri (construction of toll roads by the state was rejected by voters in 1970 and again in 1992, however MoDOT chartered transportation corporations are authorized to construct toll roads).
- Montana
- Nebraska
- New Mexico
- North Dakota
- Northern Mariana Islands
- Oregon
- South Dakota
- Tennessee
- United States Virgin Islands
- Washington, DC
- Wisconsin
- Wyoming

== See also ==
- List of toll bridges: United States
- Private highways in the United States
