= Pennsylvania Turnpike (disambiguation) =

The Pennsylvania Turnpike is a toll highway operated by the Pennsylvania Turnpike Commission.

Pennsylvania Turnpike may also refer to:

- Pennsylvania Turnpike Commission (PTC), the agency overseeing turnpike operations
- Other highways maintained by the PTC that operate under the Pennsylvania Turnpike system, including:
  - The James E. Ross Highway, part of Interstate 376
  - The Pennsylvania Turnpike Northeast Extension, part of Interstate 476
  - PA Turnpike 43, part of the Mon–Fayette Expressway
  - PA Turnpike 66 (also known as the Amos K. Hutchinson Bypass), part of Pennsylvania Route 66
  - Pennsylvania Route 576, also known as the Southern Beltway

== See also ==
- Abandoned Pennsylvania Turnpike, the abandoned section of road between Breezewood and Hustontown
- List of toll roads in Pennsylvania
- Pennsylvania Turnpike/Interstate 95 Interchange Project
- Philadelphia and Lancaster Turnpike
