= NYSBA =

NYSBA may refer to:

- New York State Bar Association
- New York State Bridge Authority
