= Newburgh–Beacon Bridge =

Cantilever toll bridge between Newburgh and Beacon, New York, US

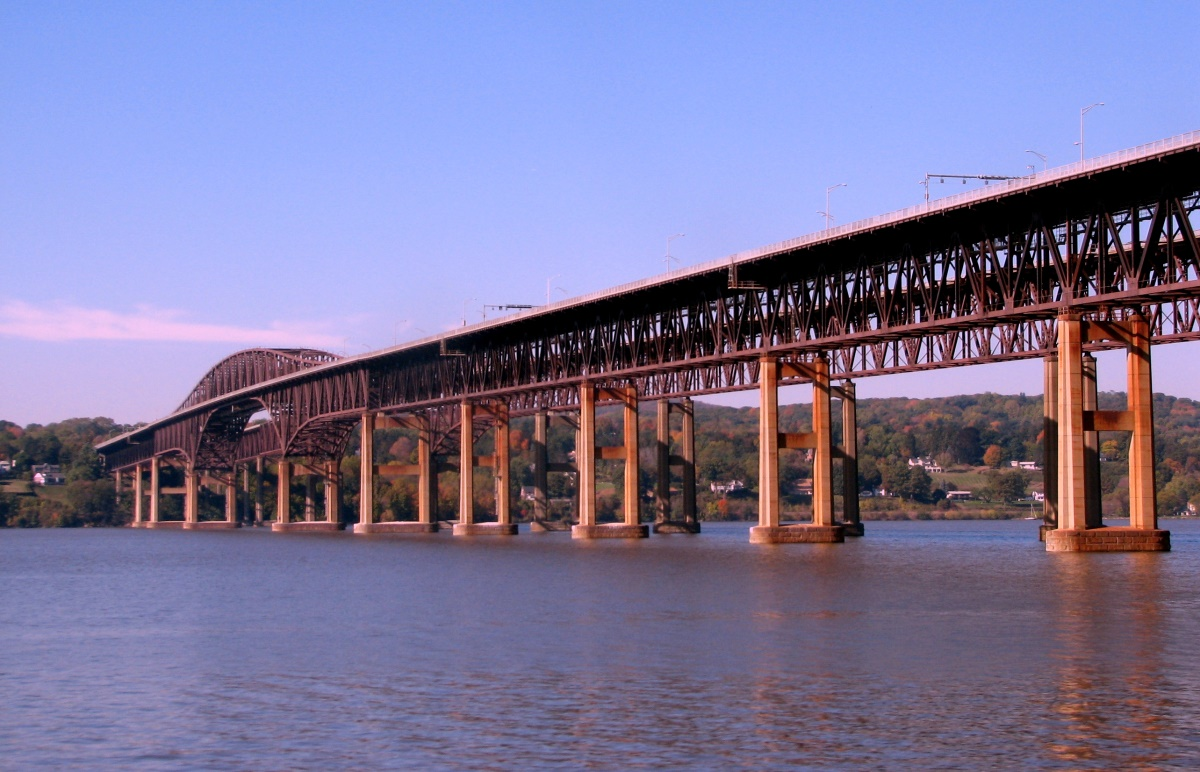
- Newburgh–Beacon Bridge from Beacon
- Coordinates: 41.519246°N 73.994293°W
- Carries: 6 lanes of I-84 / NY 52, bikes/pedestrians
- Crosses: Hudson River
- Locale: Newburgh, New York and Beacon, New York
- Official name: Hamilton Fish Newburgh–Beacon Bridge
- Maintained by: New York State Bridge Authority
- NYSDOT BIN: 5060381

Characteristics
- Design: Twin span Continuous truss bridges
- Total length: 7,789 feet (2,374 m); 7,855 feet (2,394 m)
- Longest span: 1,000 feet (300 m)
- Clearance below: 135 feet (41 m)

History
- Opened: November 2, 1963; 62 years ago (westbound); November 1, 1980; 45 years ago (eastbound)

Statistics
- Daily traffic: 65,000
- Toll: (Eastbound only) cars: $1.65 E-ZPass $2.15 tolls-by-mail

Location
- Interactive map of Newburgh–Beacon Bridge

The Newburgh–Beacon Bridge is a continuous truss toll bridge that spans the Hudson River in New York State. The bridge carries Interstate 84 (I-84) and New York State Route 52 (NY 52) between Newburgh and Beacon and consists of two separate spans. The original northern span, which now carries westbound traffic, was opened on November 2, 1963, as a two-lane (one in each direction) bridge. A second span, completed in 1980, now carries all eastbound traffic. The span provides connections to the New York State Thruway (I-87) and U.S. Route 9W (US 9W) in Newburgh and US 9 in Fishkill. The bridges includes a 2,204-foot-long (672 m) cantilever span, with a main span of 1,000 feet (300 m) and side spans of 602 feet (183 m). The total length of all spans and approaches is 7,855 feet (2,394 m) for the north span and 7,789 feet (2,374 m) for the south span. The bridges, owned by the New York State Bridge Authority, carry six lanes of traffic and approximately 65,000 vehicles per day. The bridge is officially known as the Hamilton Fish Newburgh–Beacon Bridge.

== History ==
Although original plans called for a four-lane bridge, funding difficulties resulted in the reduction in lanes. This span was designed by Modjeski & Masters and constructed by Frederick Snare Corporation, Drave, and Bethlehem Steel. The now westbound bridge opened on November 2, 1963, carrying one lane of traffic in each direction.

In August 1970, the toll was abolished for westbound drivers, and at the same time, eastbound drivers saw their tolls doubled.

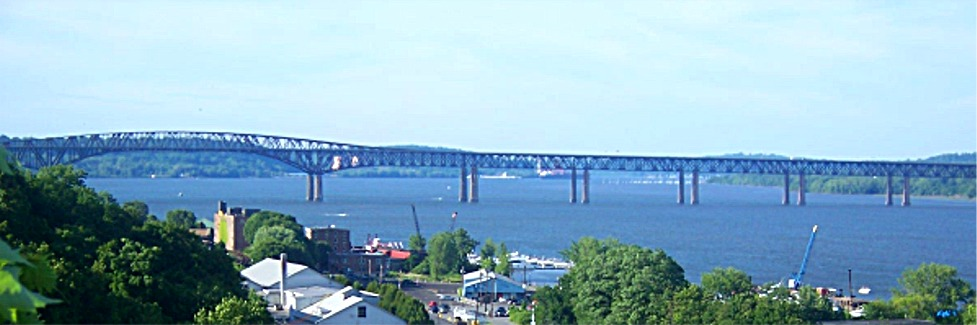
Newburgh-Beacon Bridge from Newburgh, NY

The bridge originally carried NY 52 traffic, which was light, but the construction of Interstate 84 pushed the bridge over capacity, and planning for additional capacity began in 1972. After considering double-decking (which the original bridge was not designed for) the decision was taken by NYSBA to add a second parallel span south of the original. On November 1, 1980, this second, parallel span, also designed by Modjeski & Masters but constructed by the American Bridge Company, was opened to traffic. This eastbound span was built with three 12-foot (3.7 m) travel lanes, and a 10-foot (3.0 m) right shoulder. Because of this, unlike the westbound span, there is no need to reduce the travel lanes to two during off-peak times. It is also made of weathering steel (believed to be COR-TEN or similar, although sources are not clear), the surface of which intentionally corrodes, forming a brown colored protective layer that does not require paint. The bicycle path on the eastbound span was opened in 1981, making it the second interstate funded bike path in the United States. The original span was closed for a major renovation from December 1980 to June 1984, in order widen the deck to accommodate three 12-foot (3.7 m) travel lanes, increase its strengthening, install Variable lane signs, and repaint it a shade of brown to match the color of the eastbound span. After work was completed, the original span was converted to serve westbound traffic, and the 1980 span was converted to serve eastbound traffic, though it still had no permanent shoulders. to allow the right lane to be designated as a breakdown lane at night and off-peak travel times. When the right lane is being used as a shoulder, a red X appears on the signs above it, while a green arrow illuminates when the lane is used for travel during peak times.

In 1997, the bridges were rededicated in honor of Hamilton Fish III, a 12-term member of the U.S. House of Representatives, and his son and namesake Hamilton Fish IV, a 13-term member of the House.

In 2006, the west approach was repaved and a new truck inspection area was built to allow the State Police to conduct inspections in a safe area that would not interfere with regular traffic flow.

The toll plaza was reconfigured in August 2010.

In October 2013, a $94.7 million project to replace the eastbound spans deck was commenced. It was completed in October 2015.

In 2019, a $13,900,750 project was completed that rebuilt the overpass carrying traffic over US 9W in Newburgh, in order to provide better clearance for truck traffic below on Route 9W and to meet current interstate highway standards.

At midnight on July 7, 2021, the bridge was converted to all-electronic tolling on the eastbound span, involved in this was the removal of a large segment of roadway.

In late 2020, a $95 million project to replace the westbound spans deck was commenced. It was considered mostly complete by October 1, 2022, nine months ahead of schedule.

On November 27, 2022, the walkway had its curfew removed, allowing pedestrians to walk across it 24/7.

== Tolls ==
Eastbound passenger vehicles are currently (as of May 1, 2023) charged a cash toll of $2.15 to cross the span, or $1.65 for E-ZPass. The toll plaza is located on the eastern (Beacon) shore. Originally, tolls were collected in both directions. The tolls of eleven other New York–New Jersey and Hudson River crossings along a 130-mile (210 km) stretch, from the Outerbridge Crossing in the south to the Rip Van Winkle Bridge in the north, were also changed to eastbound-only at that time.

In 2019, the bridge authority announced that tolls on its five Hudson River crossings would increase each year beginning in 2020 and ending in 2023. As of May 1, 2021, the current toll for passenger cars traveling eastbound on the Mid-Hudson Bridge was $1.75 in cash, $1.45 for E-ZPass users. In May 2022, tolls will rise to $1.55 for E-ZPass users and $2 for cash payers. In 2023, the E-ZPass toll will increase to $1.65, and the cash toll will rise to $2.15.

== See also ==
- List of fixed crossings of the Hudson River
