= AutoExpreso =

Electronic toll collection system used on tollways in Puerto Rico

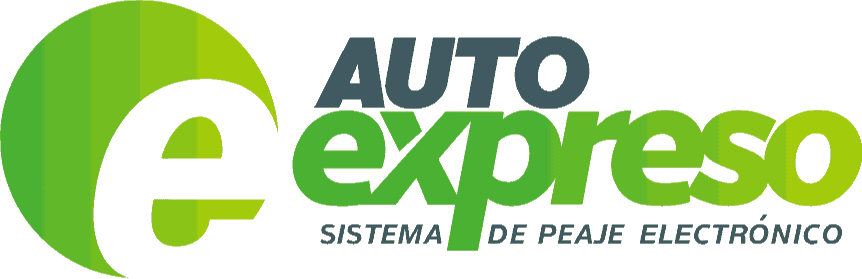
- Industry: Electronic toll collection
- Headquarters: San Juan, Puerto Rico
- Area served: Puerto Rico
- Products: Transponder; Car tags
- Website: autoexpreso.com

AutoExpreso is an electronic toll collection system used on tollways in the United States territory of Puerto Rico. The system uses passive transponders where payment status is indicated by a light at the toll plazas. In 2012, AutoExpreso became the exclusive form of payment on most of Puerto Rico's tollways, with cash no longer being accepted. However, until 2015, cash was still accepted on PR-5 and PR-22 due to the privatization of those tollways.

In addition to window transponders, a card form of AutoExpreso known as MóvilCash is also available. AutoExpreso is not interoperable with other electronic toll collection systems outside Puerto Rico (such as E-ZPass in the northeastern United States or SunPass in Florida).

== Accepting tollways ==
- Puerto Rico Highway 5
- Teodoro Moscoso Bridge on Puerto Rico Highway 17
- Puerto Rico Highway 20
- Puerto Rico Highway 22
- Puerto Rico Highway 52
- Puerto Rico Highway 53
- Puerto Rico Highway 66
