= New York State Bridge Authority =

Public benefit corporation in New York State, United States

New York State Bridge Authority Police Department

Authority overview
- Formed: March 31, 1932
- Jurisdiction: Six bridges crossing the Hudson River in the Hudson Valley
- Headquarters: NYSBA; PO Box 1010; Highland, NY
- Authority executive: Dr. Minosca Alcantara, Executive Director
- Website: www.nysba.ny.gov

The New York State Bridge Authority (NYSBA) is a public benefit corporation in New York State, United States. The NYSBA was born out of the necessity to build a bridge over the Hudson River to link the city of Hudson and the village of Catskill. It owns, operates, and maintains five Hudson River bridge crossings in the Mid-Hudson River Valley of New York State. It also owns and maintains the Walkway Over the Hudson, but that structure is operated by the New York State Office of Parks, Recreation and Historic Preservation.

== Organization ==
NYSBA is guided by an unpaid 7-member Board of Commissioners (one seat of which is currently vacant) who are appointed by the New York State Governor. NYSBA's management team is headed by Executive Director Dr. Minosca Alcantara. In 2017, NYSBA had operating expenses of $51.08 million, an outstanding debt of $89.72 million, and a staffing level of 282 people.

NYSBA has been self-sufficient throughout its more than eighty-five year history, operating without Federal or State tax monies and reinvesting toll revenues to continue to maintain and improve these vital Hudson River Crossings.

== History ==
The origin of the NYSBA was embodied in the Great Depression during the 1930s and 1940s. State finances were in short supply and an originally proposed plan for the state to build the Rip Van Winkle Bridge was vetoed by then Governor Franklin D. Roosevelt. A possible precursor to the New Deal, Roosevelt supported the creation of an Authority, separate from state finances.

On March 31, 1932, Roosevelt signed into law a bill sponsored by Greene County Assemblyman Ellis Bentley that created the Bridge Authority as an entity that would issue toll revenue bonds to pay for what would become the Rip Van Winkle Bridge.

In 1933, during the construction of the Rip Van Winkle Bridge, the Authority acquired the Mid-Hudson Bridge, originally built by the State Department of Public Works in 1930.

Of note, the toll for a round trip across the Mid-Hudson Bridge for a car with 3 passengers in 1933 was $2.20, more than the $1.75 charged today. The 1933 $1 toll for a one horse wagon is no longer charged.

The Rip Van Winkle Bridge was dedicated in 1935.

The Bear Mountain Bridge, originally built by a private venture in 1924, was sold to the Authority in 1940.

The Authority dedicated the Kingston-Rhinecliff Bridge in 1957, the first span of the Newburgh-Beacon Bridge in 1963 and the second span in 1980.

The Bridge Authority charges an auto cash toll of $1.75 for eastbound traffic on all five bridges. E-ZPass customers pay $1.35. The last rate increase was May 1, 2020, a 25 cent increase from the prior rate of $1.50. Commercial tolls are based on axle count. NYSBA is a member of the E-ZPass electronic toll collection system.

In 2020 Governor Andrew Cuomo proposed to merge NYSBA with the New York State Thruway Authority but withdrew the plan after opposition from the Hudson Valley delegation to the state legislature, who feared it would be detrimental to the bridges and lead to higher tolls They believed Cuomo's real goal was to use NYSBA's budget surpluses to offset the Thruway Authority's deficits and subsidize its construction projects. The year's state budget did give Cuomo the authority to replace the Bridge Authority's entire board even if they had not finished their terms, and he did. Legislators accused Cuomo of trying to install a board that would be more amenable to the governor's merger plans; state senator Sue Serino of Hyde Park voted against confirming all of the replacements, and some of her colleagues from the region opposed some. One, Jen Metzger of Rosendale, said the Hudson Valley legislators would be watching the new appointees closely to make sure they were "independent thinkers".

=== Statutory authority ===
The law creating the New York State Bridge Authority is found in the Bridge Authority Act, currently Sections 525 to 542 of the New York Public Authorities Law and defines the Bridge Authority's mission as “to maintain and operate the safe vehicle crossings over the Hudson River entrusted to its jurisdiction for the economic and social benefit of the people of the State of New York.”

The crossings listed in the statute are: the Rip Van Winkle Bridge between Hudson and Catskill; the Kingston-Rhinecliff Bridge; the Mid-Hudson Bridge between Poughkeepsie and Highland; the parallel Newburgh-Beacon spans; and the Bear Mountain Bridge.

The Authority believes its mandate imposes a responsibility to provide reliable, safe and convenient access across the river to all lawful traffic and to achieve that goal within the framework of a sound long-term financial policy. The elements of that policy are:

An unqualified commitment to meet all obligations to the bondholders in the full letter and spirit of the Authority's General Revenue Bond Resolution and the covenants made therein; A vigorous, integrated program of inspection, maintenance, repair and rehabilitation to insure the structural integrity of its facilities and the safety of its patrons; Control of expenditures to the extent consistent with prudent stewardship and responsible administration; and The lowest possible toll rates which at the same time enable the Authority to meet its obligations and responsibilities as well as provide for adequate financial reserves.

== Police ==
A New York State Bridge Authority Police patch.

The New York State Bridge Authority has 1 sworn police officer who is assigned to the Bridge Authority's Command Center in Highland as well as numerous facilities under control of the Bridge Authority. The Bridge Authority police officer is unarmed and is responsible for system-wide security. This officer also acts as liaison to the multiple police agencies whose jurisdictions overlap Authority facilities and performs traffic enforcement and incident response services.

== Bridge facilities (north to south) ==
- Rip Van Winkle Bridge (cantilever truss)
- Kingston-Rhinecliff Bridge (continuous under-deck truss)
- Walkway over the Hudson (cantilever truss)
- Mid-Hudson Bridge (suspension bridge)
- Newburgh-Beacon Bridge (cantilever truss)
- Bear Mountain Bridge (suspension bridge)

The Bridge Authority operates all 5 of the vehicular road bridges on the Hudson between the Bear Mountain and Rip Van Winkle Bridges. It also owns and maintains the Walkway over the Hudson, but does not operate it. To the north and south of its jurisdiction are, respectively, two of the New York State Thruway Authority's bridges: Tappan Zee Bridge to the south and the Berkshire Extension bridge to the north, known as the Castleton Bridge.

== See also ==
- New York State Canal Corporation
- New York Power Authority
