= Climate of Beaumont, Texas =

The Climate of Beaumont, Texas covers the averages and extremes in past weather seen within the city of Beaumont, Texas. The city is within the humid subtropical climate regime, and is within the Piney Woods region of eastern Texas. The area around Beaumont receives the most rainfall in the state: more than 65 inches (1,700 mm) annually. Summers in the area are usually hot and humid, due to the moisture that flows inland off of the Gulf of Mexico. Winters are usually kept mild by the warm gulf waters. Hurricanes also pose a threat to the area. Hurricane Harvey in 2017, Hurricane Rita in 2005, and Hurricane Ike in 2008 were the most recent significant storms to strike.

== Temperature ==
Summers in the area are usually hot and humid, due to the moisture that flows inland off of the Gulf of Mexico. Winters are usually kept mild by the warm gulf waters.

Monthly normal high and low temperatures (°F) for Beaumont/Port Arthur, Texas
Jan	Feb	Mar	Apr	May	Jun	Jul	Aug	Sep	Oct	Nov	Dec
62/43	65/46	72/52	78/59	84/66	89/72	92/74	92/73	88/69	80/60	71/51	64/44

== Precipitation ==
The Beaumont area receives the most rainfall in the state: more than 65 inches (1,700 mm) annually. This is due to the warm gulf waters that carry humid air to the region, where it condenses and precipitates. The city itself and much of the region has a wet season from April to October and a dry season from November to March.

=== Wintry Precipitation ===
While wintry precipitation is unusual, it does occur. The most recent significant wintry event to occur was January 21, 2025 when the Southeast Texas Regional Airport recorded 7 inches of snowfall. December 11, 2008 and December 4, 2009 were also days that Beaumont saw measurable snowfall. Snow also fell across the Beaumont area on Christmas Eve 2004. In January 1997, a severe and historic ice storm struck the region, leaving thousands without power and major tree damage in its wake. In unofficial records, Beaumont received as much as 30 inches of snow during the blizzard of February 1895 that impacted the Gulf Coast. In February 2021 Winter Storm Uri struck all of the state, affecting Beaumont. Power outages were reported but the main issues were low water pressure and crippled travel. Record cold followed the storm and Beaumont plunged all the way down to 14 degrees Fahrenheit. Snow and sleet totals were 1-2 inches throughout most of the region. On February 17, Winter Storm Viola caused freezing rain around the area. Accumulations were measured at 0.01-0.10 inches. Many homes and businesses in the region suffered from busted water pipes from these two events.

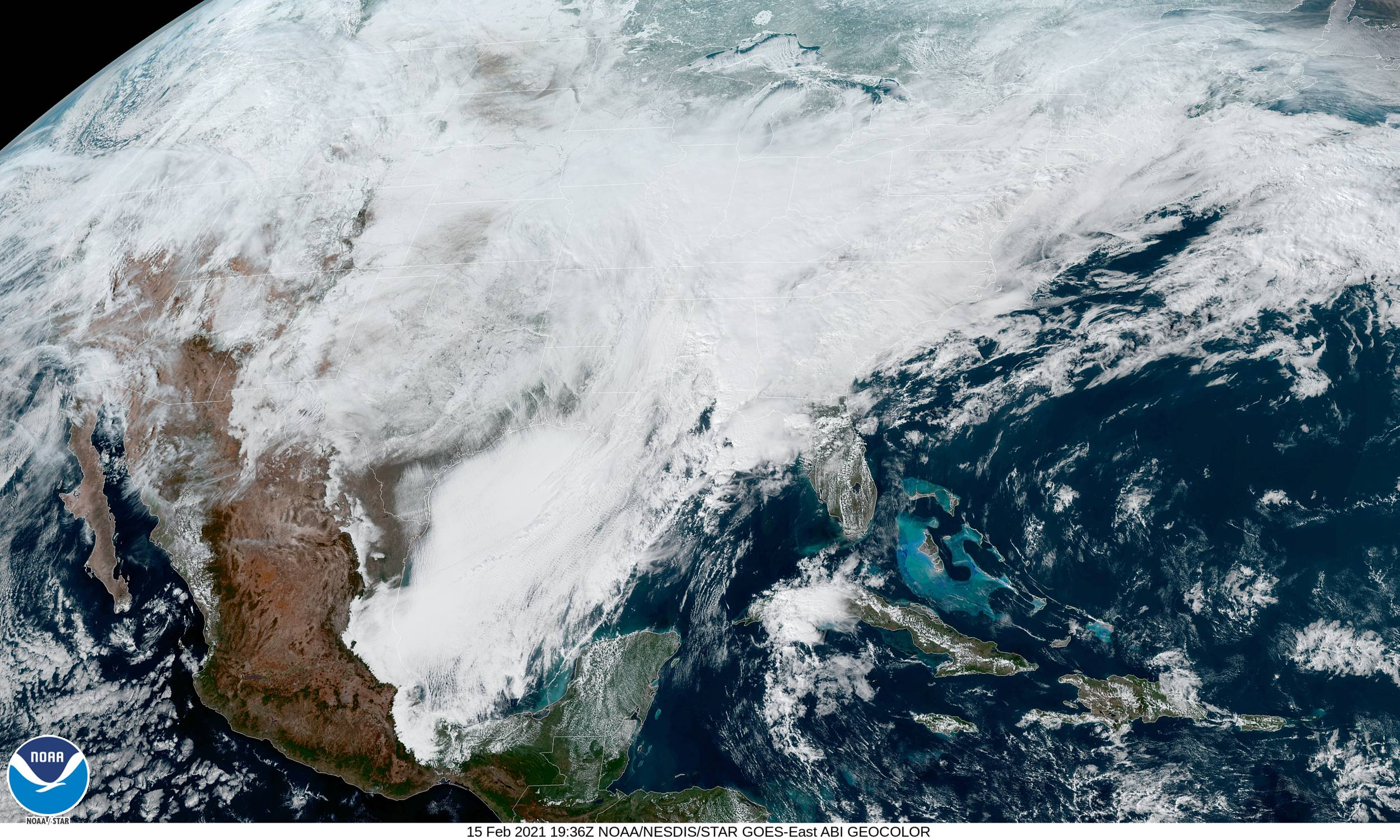
Winter Storm Uri moving east after hitting the state of Texas and other southern states.

== Severe Weather ==
=== Hurricanes and Tropical Storms ===
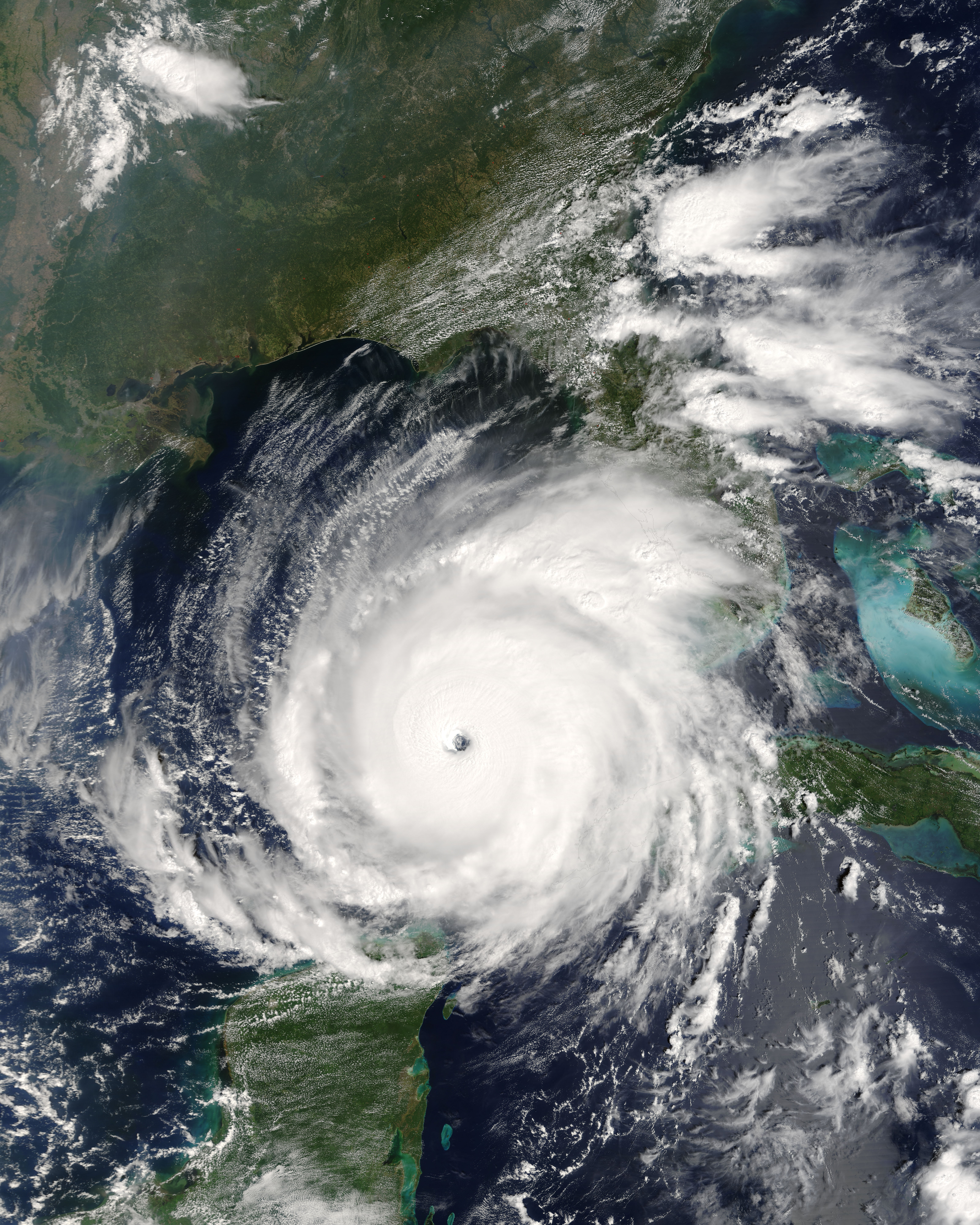
Hurricane Rita (2005)

In October 1886, a category 3 hurricane came ashore near Sabine Pass, a coastal community southeast of Beaumont, causing widespread wind damage and coastal flooding in the area.

In 1957, Hurricane Audrey, a category 3 hurricane, roared ashore near the Sabine River, causing major coastal flooding and wind damage. At least 416 people lost their lives (other estimates show over 500), mostly in Louisiana due to drowning from storm surge.

In 1961, Hurricane Carla affected the entire Texas coastline from Jefferson County to Brownsville. Carla caused $2.6 billion (2006 dollars) in damage. The Beaumont area received wind damage, tornadoes, and flooding from the storm.

In 1963, Hurricane Cindy, a category 1 hurricane, affected the upper Texas coast and western Louisiana. Much of the storm's damage was due to flooding resulting from over 20 inches of rain. 4,000 homes in Jefferson, Orange, and Newton counties were flooded.

In 1980, Tropical Storm Danielle struck the area. The primary impact from Danielle was flooding. A National Hurricane Center preliminary report noted "...There was major Metropolitan area flooding in the Beaumont-Port Arthur area of Texas requiring evacuation of some homes....One fatality was caused directly by the storm when an automobile was driven beyond a barricade into 15 feet of water in Beaumont, Texas."

In 1983, Hurricane Alicia struck the Texas coast west of the Beaumont area; however, the city did receive light impacts from the storm.

In June 1986, Hurricane Bonnie hit the Beaumont area as a category 1 hurricane. The storm's primary impact was flooding from heavy rain. Some locations near the city received 5 inches (130 mm) to 10 inches (250 mm) of rain, flooding many homes and businesses. Three people lost their lives due to Bonnie.

In June 2001, Tropical Storm Allison struck the upper Texas coast. The worst impacts were felt west of the Beaumont area, but the city and the surrounding area still suffered damage from flooding. 7 inches (180 mm) to 10 inches (250 mm) of rain fell in and around Beaumont, causing widespread issues on roadways throughout the area.

On September 24, 2005, Hurricane Rita made landfall near the Texas/Louisiana border as a category 3 hurricane with 120 mph winds. The storm moved northward through the Beaumont-Port Arthur Metropolitan Area and areas north, damaging or destroying many buildings. Thousands of trees were downed across the area, and power was knocked out to hundreds of thousands of residents. In advance of the storm, one of the largest evacuations in U.S. history took place, as millions of people fled the coastal areas of Texas. Hurricane Rita was the worst hurricane to strike the Beaumont area since Audrey in 1957. A total of $12 billion in damages occurred and 7 people lost their lives due to the storm.

On September 13, 2007, category 1 Hurricane Humberto struck the area, causing minor impacts.

On September 13, 2008, Hurricane Ike struck the upper Texas coast as a category 2 hurricane, causing major wind damage and storm surge flooding. Many buildings sustained damage in Beaumont, although the strongest winds remained west of the city. In total, Ike caused $31 billion in damages and 112 people lost their lives in the storm.

In August 2017, Hurricane Harvey struck the lower Texas Coast as a Category 4 hurricane, weakened, and stalled shortly after landfall. As the storm drifted offshore and began to slowly move northeast, heavy rainfall caused severe flooding all across Southeast Texas. In the Beaumont area, thousands of homes received flood damage and multiple rescues had to be performed, by both boat and helicopter. In Nederland, a city just southeast of Beaumont, 60.58" of rain fell as a result of Harvey, setting a national rainfall record for the amount of rainfall produced by a tropical system.

In August 2020, Hurricane Laura threatened to strike Beaumont and Southeast Texas as a Category 3 hurricane. Mandatory Evacuations were issued, but Laura went further east than expected and the city was spared from its worst impacts. The highest recorded sustained wind was at 48 miles an hour and the highest recorded gust was at 74 miles an hour at Beaumont Municipal Airport.

On October 9, 2020, Hurricane Delta made landfall in Creole, Louisiana as a 100 mph Category 2 Hurricane. Beaumont and surrounding areas experienced strong winds causing trees to fall and many power outages. The highest recorded sustained winds were at 65 mph and gusts to 90 mph at Jack Brooks Regional Airport.o

Hurricane Delta rapidly intensifying south of the Yucatán Peninsula

== See also ==
- Climate of Texas
