= Climate change in Texas =

Climate change in the US state of Texas

The climate in Texas is changing partially due to global warming and rising trends in greenhouse gas emissions. Over the last century Texas has experienced an increase of temperatures with the weather being especially warm. According to NOAA’s Texas climate summary , the rise of temperatures can contribute to more severe heat, including rising sea levels, more frequent extreme weather events, and increased pressure on water resources.

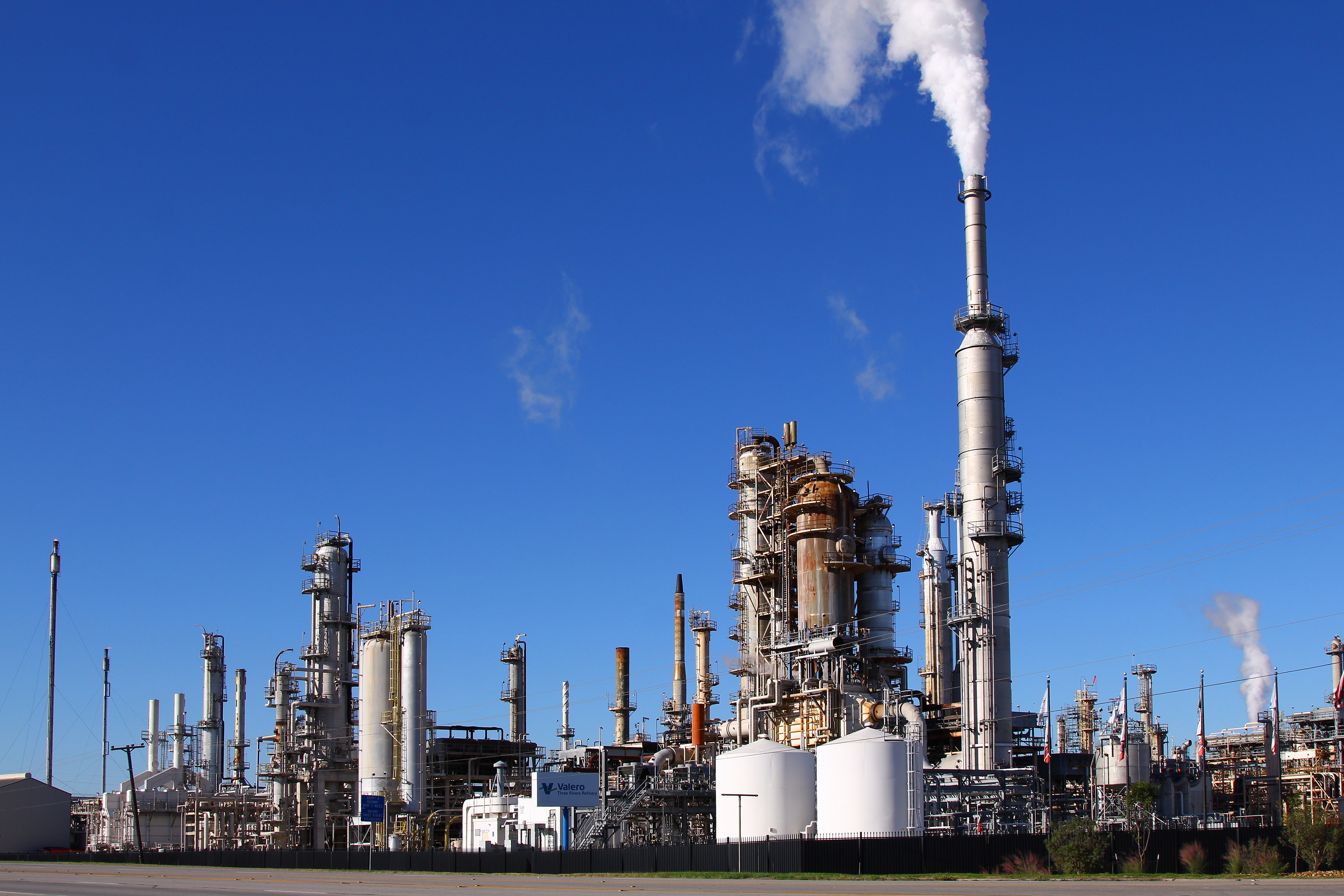
The Valero Refinery in Three Rivers, Texas

Texas was ranked second by GDP across the U.S. in 2020 and had a fast growing economy. According to U.S. Energy Information Administration, a large portion of Texas economic growth from 2005 to 2016 came from conventional energy production.

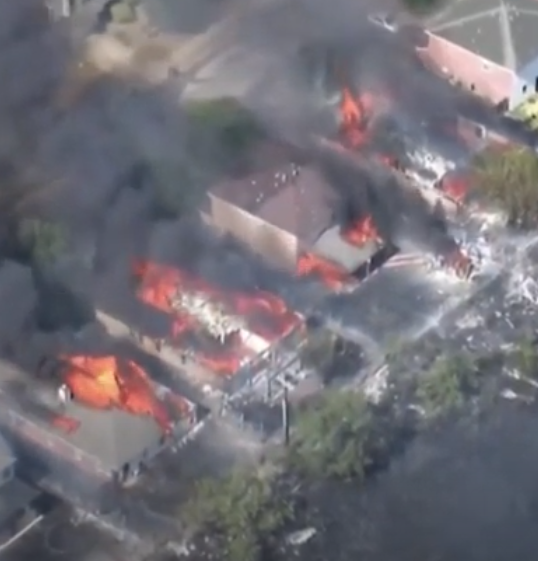
Houses destroyed by wildfire, Dallas, July 2022

Although Texas has a long history of conventional energy production (e.g., petroleum and natural gas), the renewable energy industry has also been rapidly growing in Texas. Solar industry jobs have been increasing and wind farms have been built in West Texas in recent years. Considering the advantages such as sunny weather, flat land and friendly business climate, Texas has high potential to develop more renewable energy in the future. In addition, there are emerging local and regional actions to address climate change across Texas. For example, Austin, Houston, Dallas, and San Antonio initiated Climate Action Plans in recent years. The government agencies also implemented programs such as Texas Emissions Reduction Plan and Innovative Energy Demonstration Program to promote the use of renewable energy and climate education in Texas.

== Emissions and energy ==
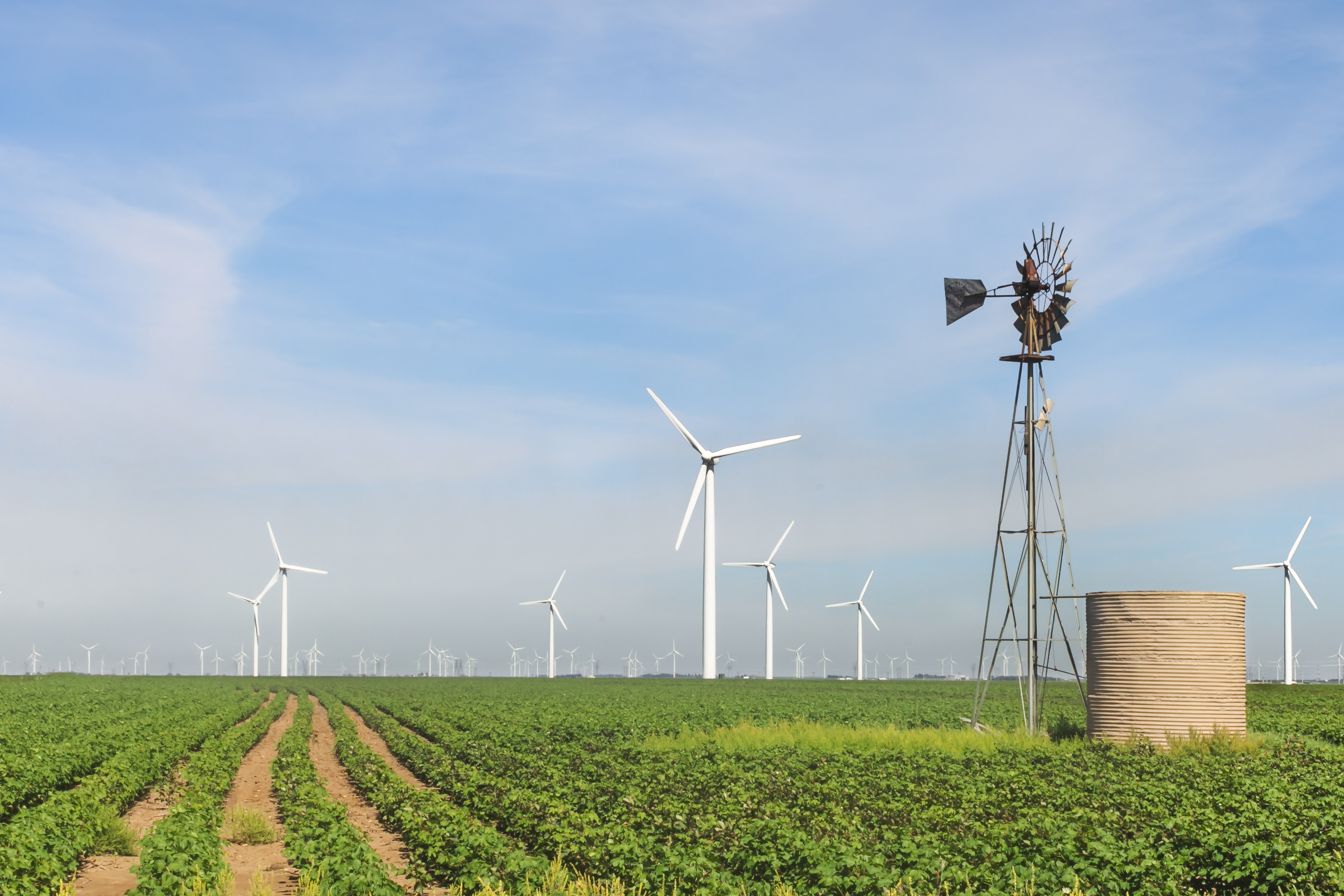
Roscoe Wind Farm, Nolan County

In the U.S., Texas was ranked first in terms of total carbon dioxide emissions in 2017 and total energy production in 2018. As of February 2020, Texas's energy mix included 18,705,000 kWh natural gas, 4,823,000 kWh coal, 3,548,000 kWh nuclear and 8,317,000 kWh renewables. Half of the energy consumed in Texas was from refineries and petrochemical plants.

Texas accounted for 41% of crude oil production, 25% of natural gas, and 31% of refining capacity, and had some of the highest potential for sustainable energy production, producing 28% of wind power for the United States.

== Climate change impacts ==
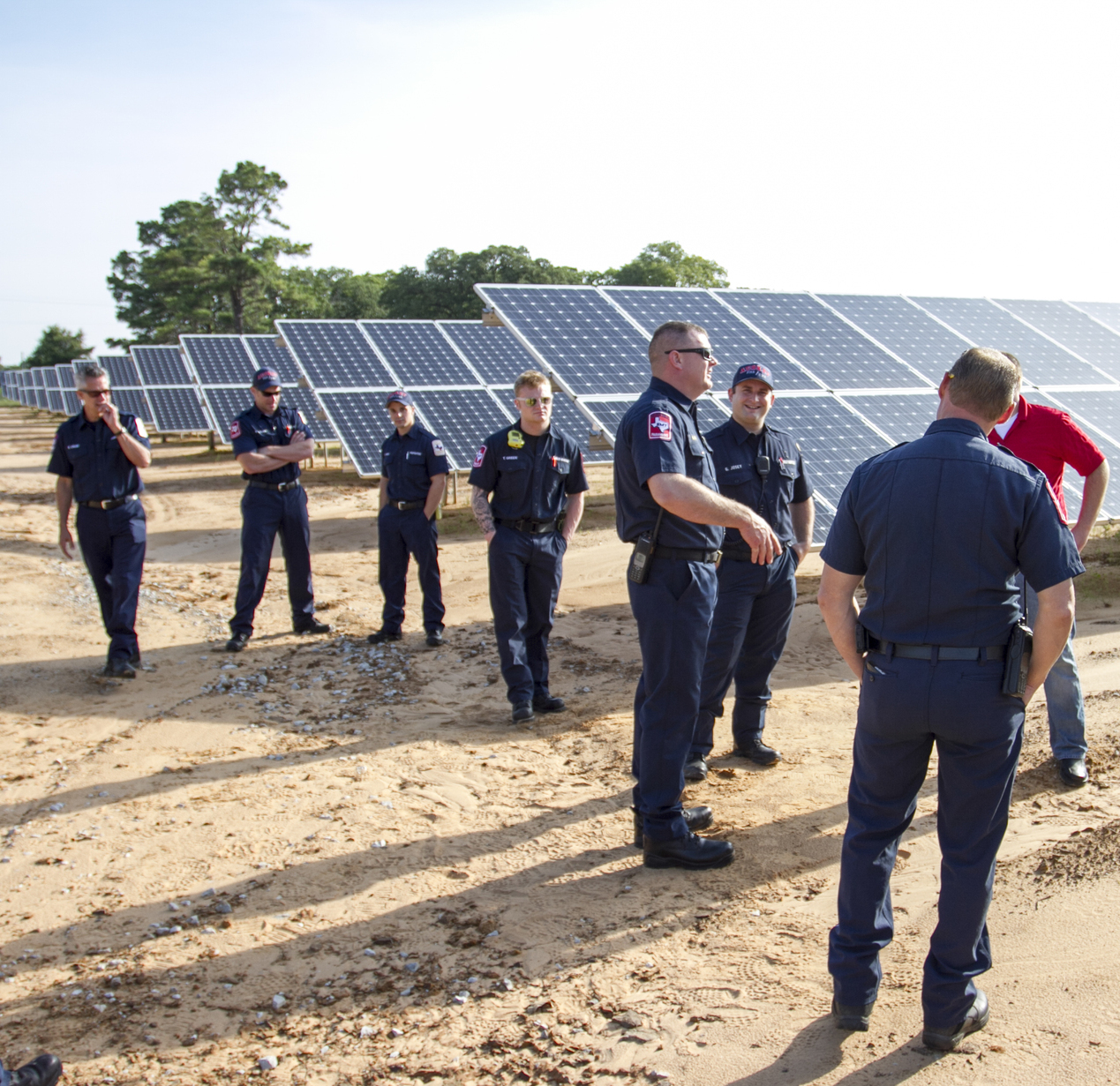
Solar power station, Krugerville

Climate change is expected to have widespread and significant impacts on Texas. Extremely hot days are expected be more frequent, due to the increasing average temperature. With higher temperature, there could be decreasing relative humidity and increasing evapotranspiration. Therefore, the degree of aridity would rise and even longer and more severe droughts could happen. There will be less available water resources under climate change and water scarcity can be exacerbated by the rapidly growing water demand due to fast urbanization in Texas.

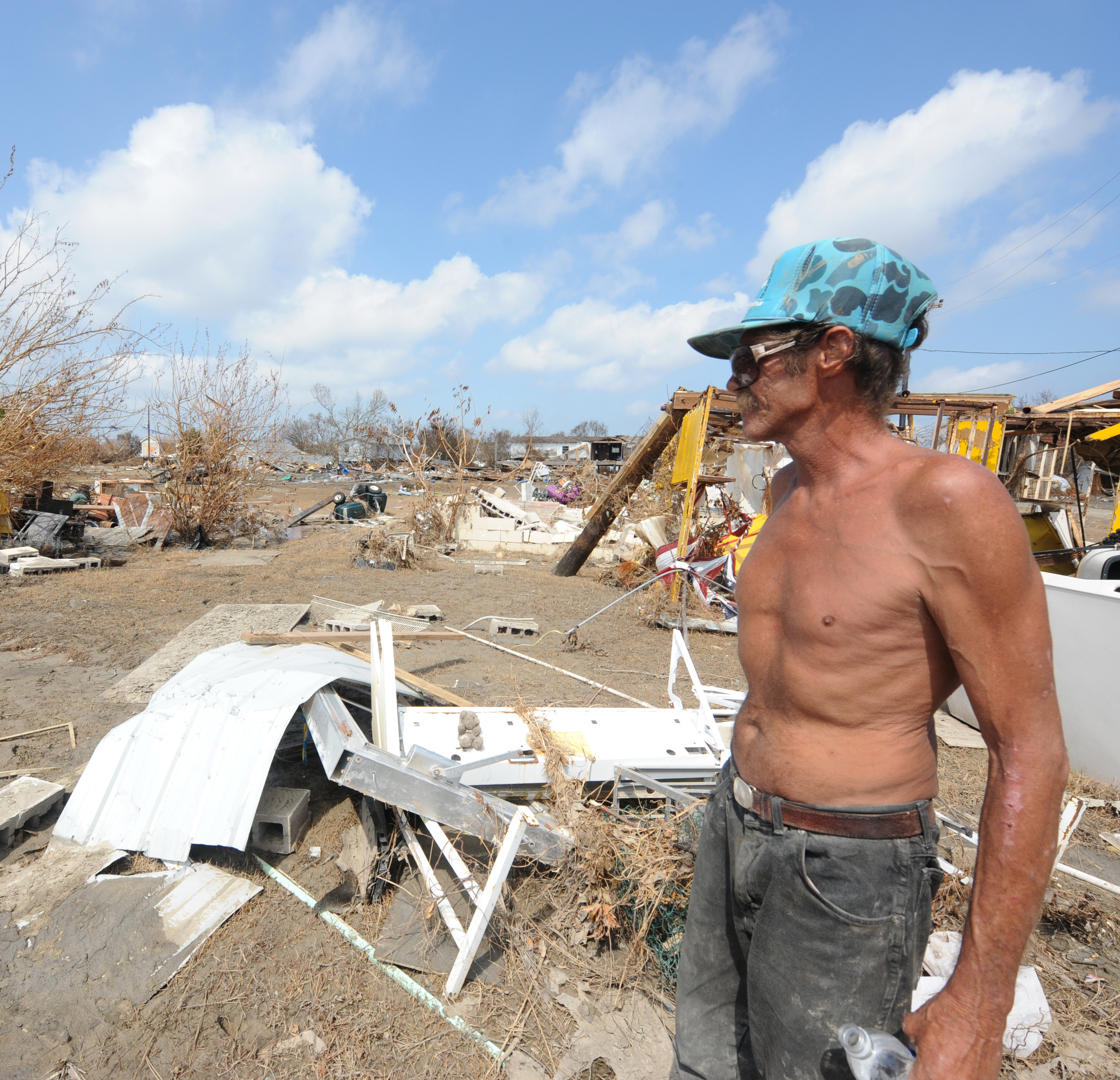
Destroyed houses, Hurricane Ike

Additionally, sea level rise along the Texas coastline is likely to be greater than the projected global sea level rise (i.e., 1–4 feet) to the end of this century, which makes the coastal region more susceptible to storm surges. Extreme weather events like hurricanes might be more intense which can make much larger losses and threaten the local residents.

There is also an increasing trend of both frequency and intensity of heavy precipitation with light or normal rains less likely to happen in the future, which could lead to higher soil moisture stress in Texas.

=== Extreme weather ===
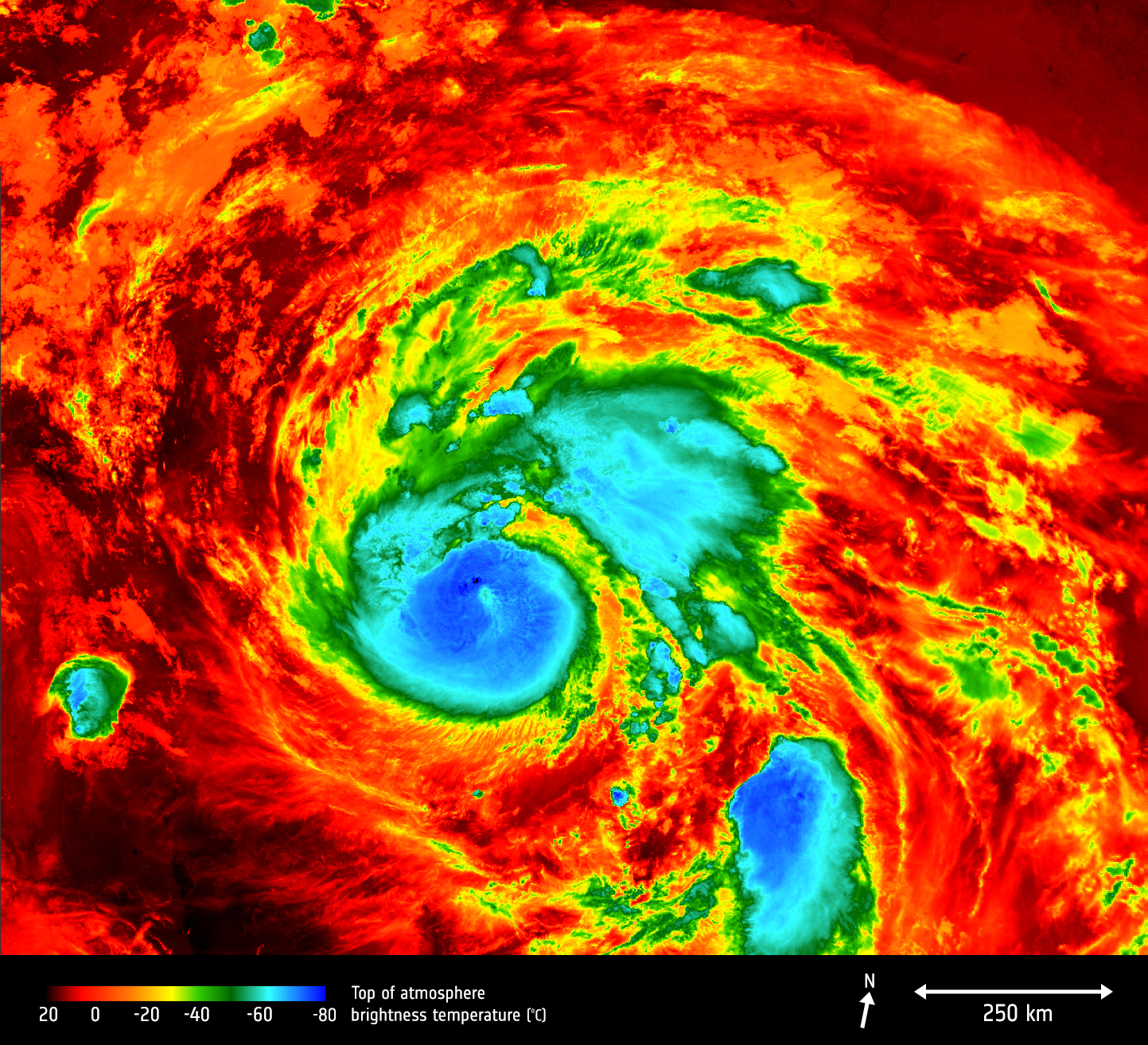
Hurricane Harvey temperature map, satellite data

Overall, the amount of precipitation on extremely wet or snowy days is likely to decrease in winter and increase in summer. Storms with heavy rain are expected to become more extreme, causing flooding. The frequency of extremely hot days in summer is also expected to increase because of the general warming trend. Many arid areas in Texas will likely enter desertification or lose its productivity for activities like livestock. A warmer atmosphere can hold more moisture, making more extreme flooding possible; according to Climate Central, San Antonio rainfall intensity has increased by 6% since 1970 while Austin's has risen by 19%.

In 2020, high temperatures and lack of rainfall led to a drought with D3 (extreme) and D4 (exceptional) categories in Texas as well as many other Western and Central states. The National Integrated Drought Information System explained how greenhouse gas emissions are a main cause for high temperatures of which they further explain that droughts can happen just with rising temperatures.

Texas had inconsistent winter storms with year gaps between them. According to Progress in Energy, in February 2021, Texas experienced terrible snowstorms and wide-range unexpected power outages that was uncommon in history, which might have been caused by climate change based on related researches.

According to the Fifth National Climate Assessment published in 2023, coastal states including California, Florida, Louisiana, and Texas are experiencing "more significant storms and extreme swings in precipitation".

Recent research from Texas A&M University shows how extreme weather conditions are becoming an alarming issue. The 2024 report stated that Texas is expected to have even worse heat conditions, droughts, and heavy rain. It has been estimated that we would experience more days reaching 100°F by 2036 compared to the 1970s and 1980s. Not only is heat rising but heavy rainfall is included with risk of floods.

==== Hurricane Harvey ====
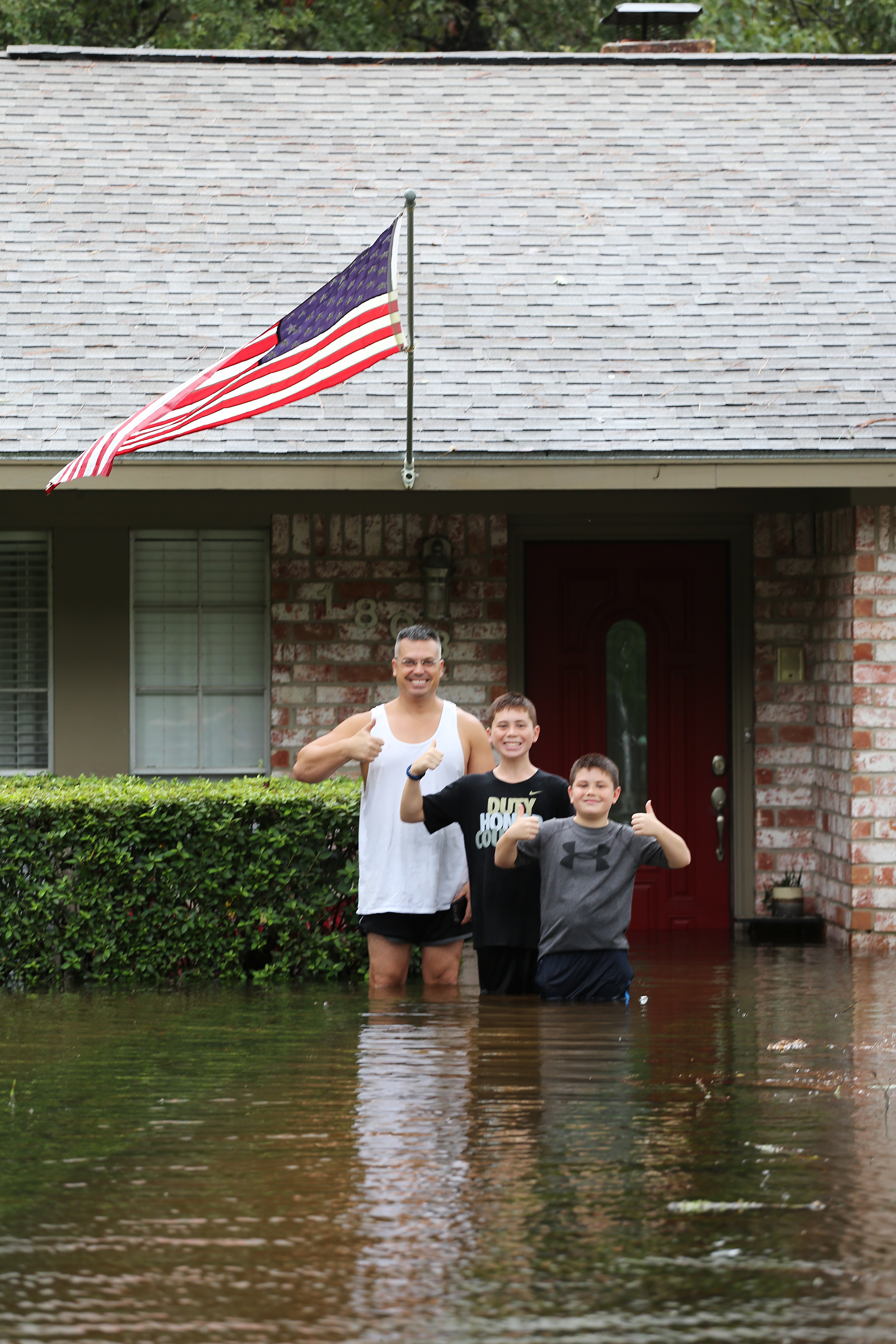
Flooded house, Hurricane Harvey

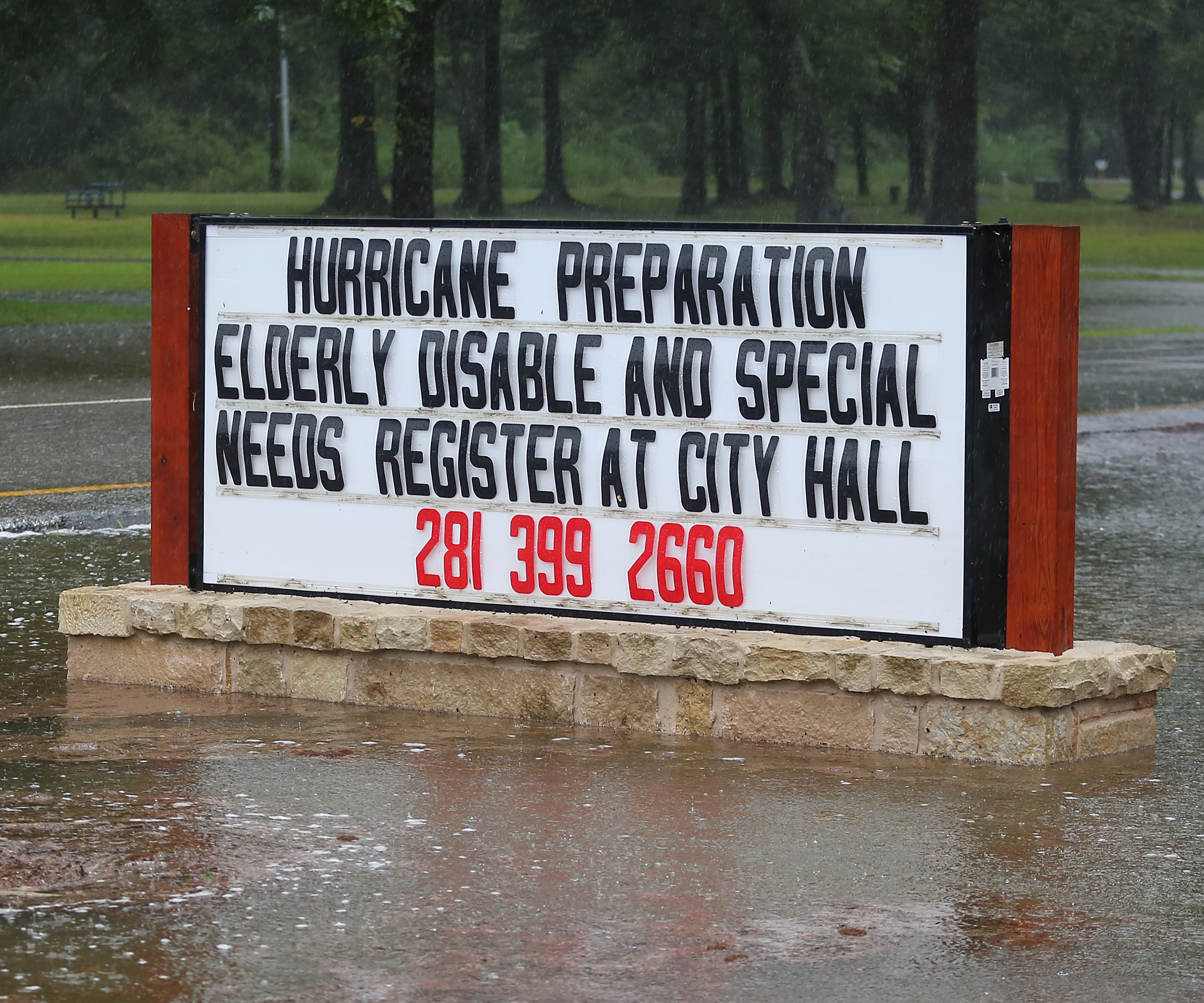
Hurricane Harvey warning sign

In August 2017, Hurricane Harvey caused unprecedented damages across Greater Houston which made it rank right after Hurricane Katrina as the second most destructive storm in the U.S. history. Numerous studies in attribution science (i.e., a relatively new study field in which scientists study the attributions of extreme weather events) were conducted to explain the role of climate change during Hurricane Harvey in Texas. It was found that around one fifth of total precipitation during Hurricane Harvey as well as the extremely enlarged chances of the observed rainfall in part of Houston during the event could be attributed to anthropogenic climate change. In addition, a quantitative attribution analysis was conducted to study Harvey's extreme precipitation by using the Advanced Research Weather Research and Forecasting (WRF-ARW) model.

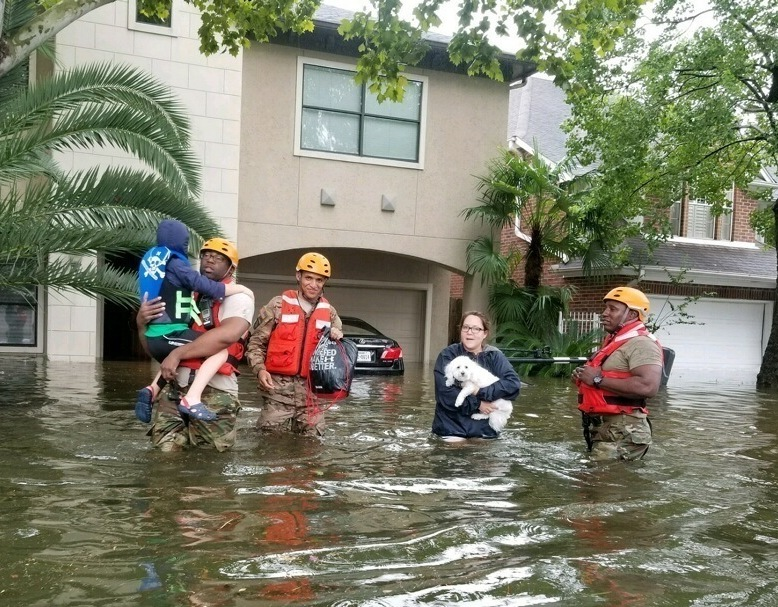
Rescue during Hurricane Harvey, Houston

The results from a series of downscaling simulations indicated that around one-fifth of the total extreme precipitation over southeast Texas during the event could be attributed to climate warming that happened after 1980. Moreover, the impacts from urbanization and climate change to flooding in Houston during Harvey was investigated and the model simulation results indicated that climate change could elevate the peak streamflow by one-fifth. It was also found that the influence of climate change on flooding can be significantly amplified by the fast-expanding urban areas around Houston.

=== Coastal changes ===
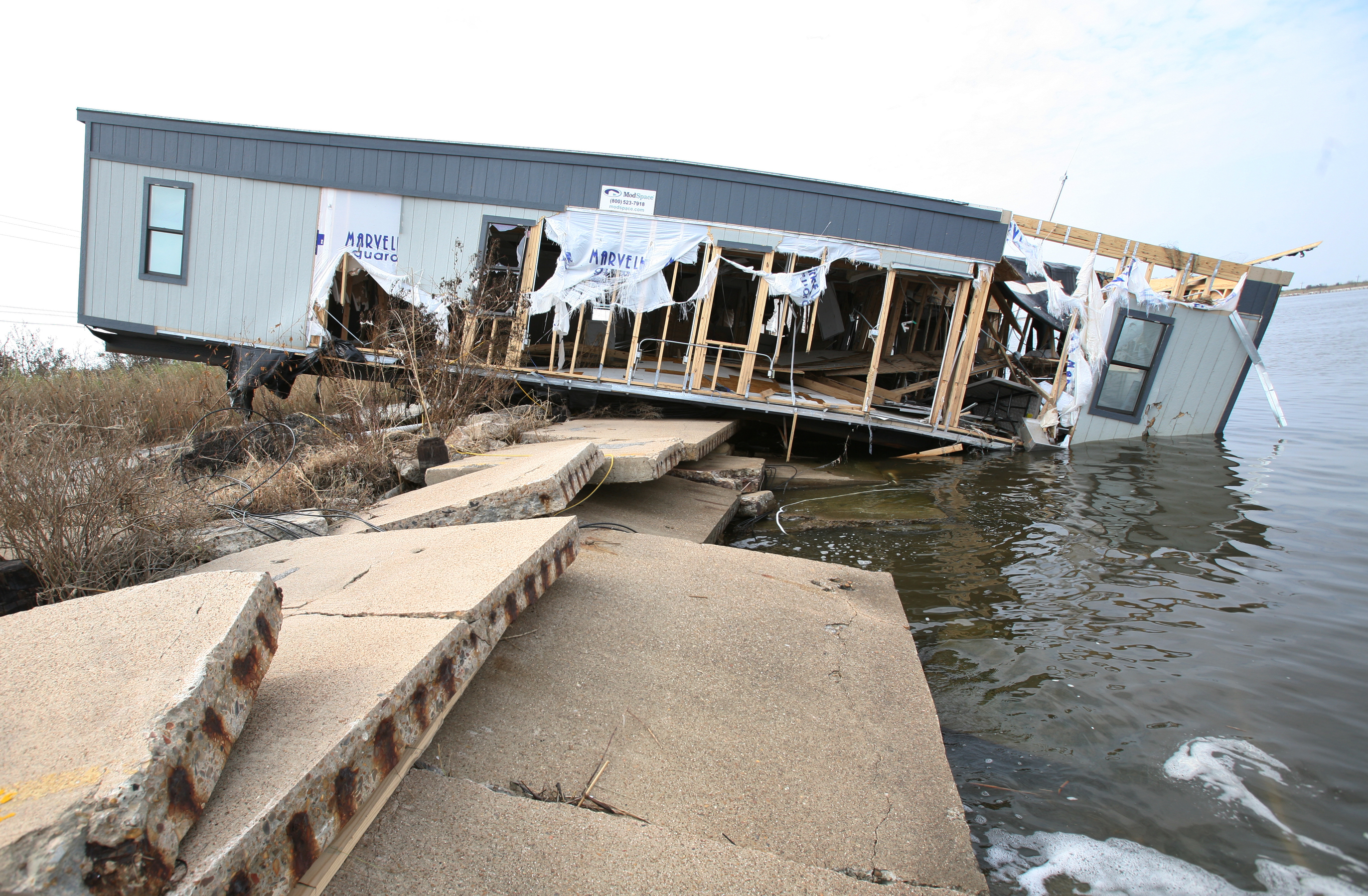
Trailer thrown into the sea, Hurricane Ike

Sea level is rapidly rising in many parts of the Texas coastal region because of both sinking land due to groundwater pumping and climate change. More storm surge events are expected to happen along the coastal region. These changes and more extreme hurricanes indicate that not only Texas's coastal infrastructure including public infrastructure, fossil fuel infrastructure, and other housing infrastructure will be endangered but also the residents' life will be threatened. In addition, the coastal ecosystem is also expected to be at risk due to the potential change of salinity gradient in coastal wetland areas.

=== Water resources ===
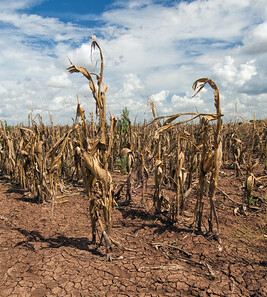
Dead corn, 2013 drought

There are 15 major river basins lying partly or entirely within Texas. Unless warmer climate are coupled with a strong increase in rainfall, water resources could become more scarce in Texas. In some parts of Texas, increased rainfall could mitigate these effects, but also could contribute to localized flooding. Additionally, climate change could give rise to more frequent and intense rainfall, resulting in flash flooding.

The U.S. Environmental protection agency (EPA) shows that rising temperatures can lead to water shortages in Texas due to increase of evaporation. This can cause soil to become dry and lakes to be reduced. This affects farmers and creates an issue for communities that depend on water sources.

==== Surface water ====
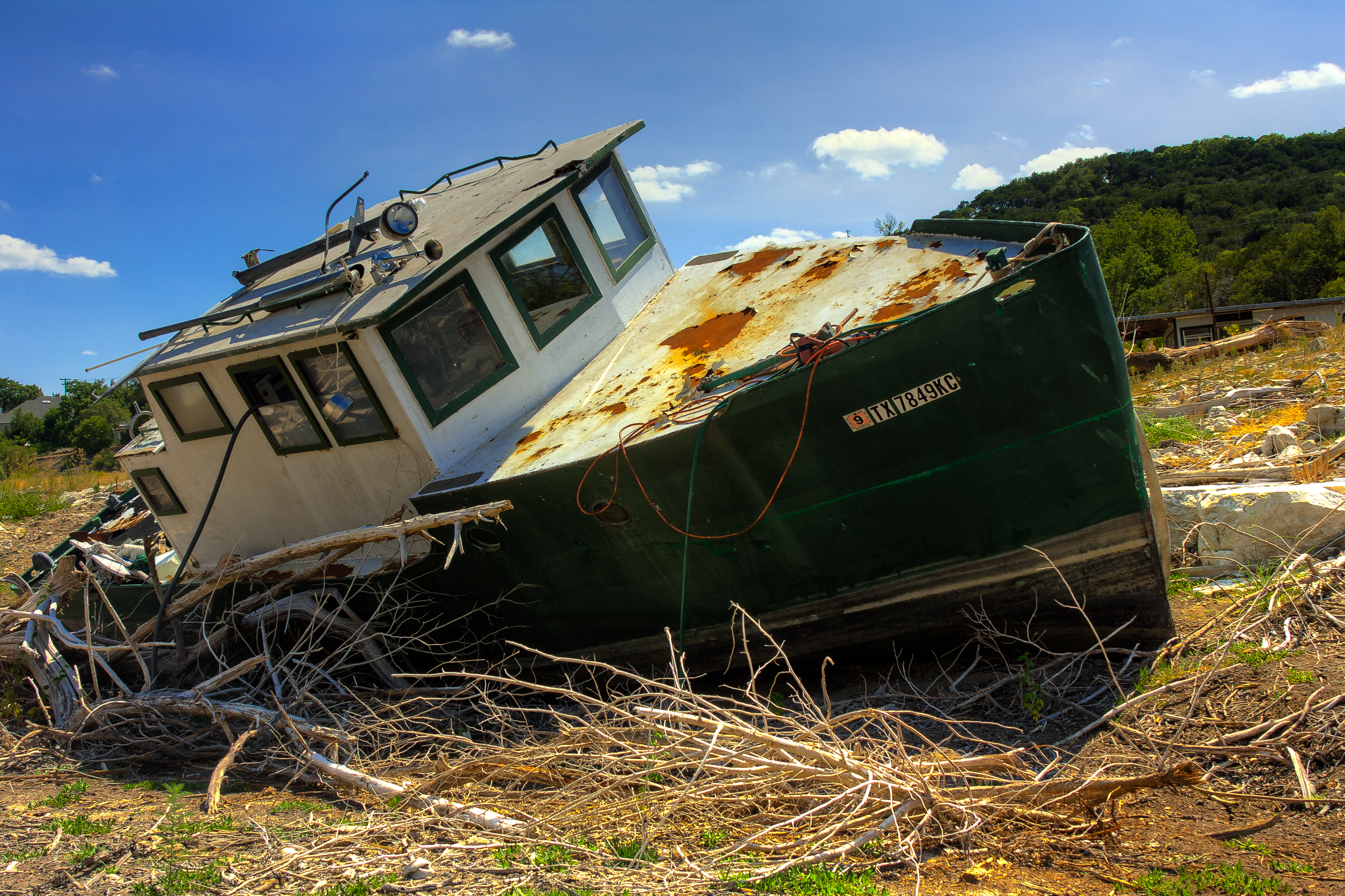
Stranded boat, Lake Travis, 2011 drought

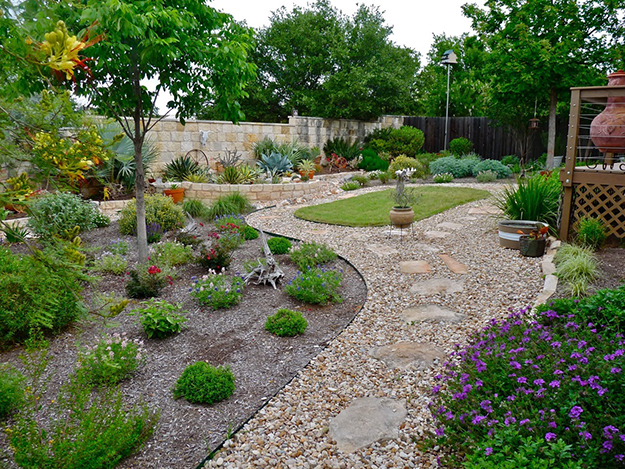
Drought-tolerant landscaping, Austin

In a warmer and drier climate condition, open water evaporation is expected to be enhanced which can lead to the shrink of lakes, rivers, and streams as well as loss of reservoir storage. Meanwhile, the increasing extreme weathers and the widely varied Texas' weather make it more challenging for the local water resources managers and regional water planners to manage the available surface water resources.

==== Groundwater ====
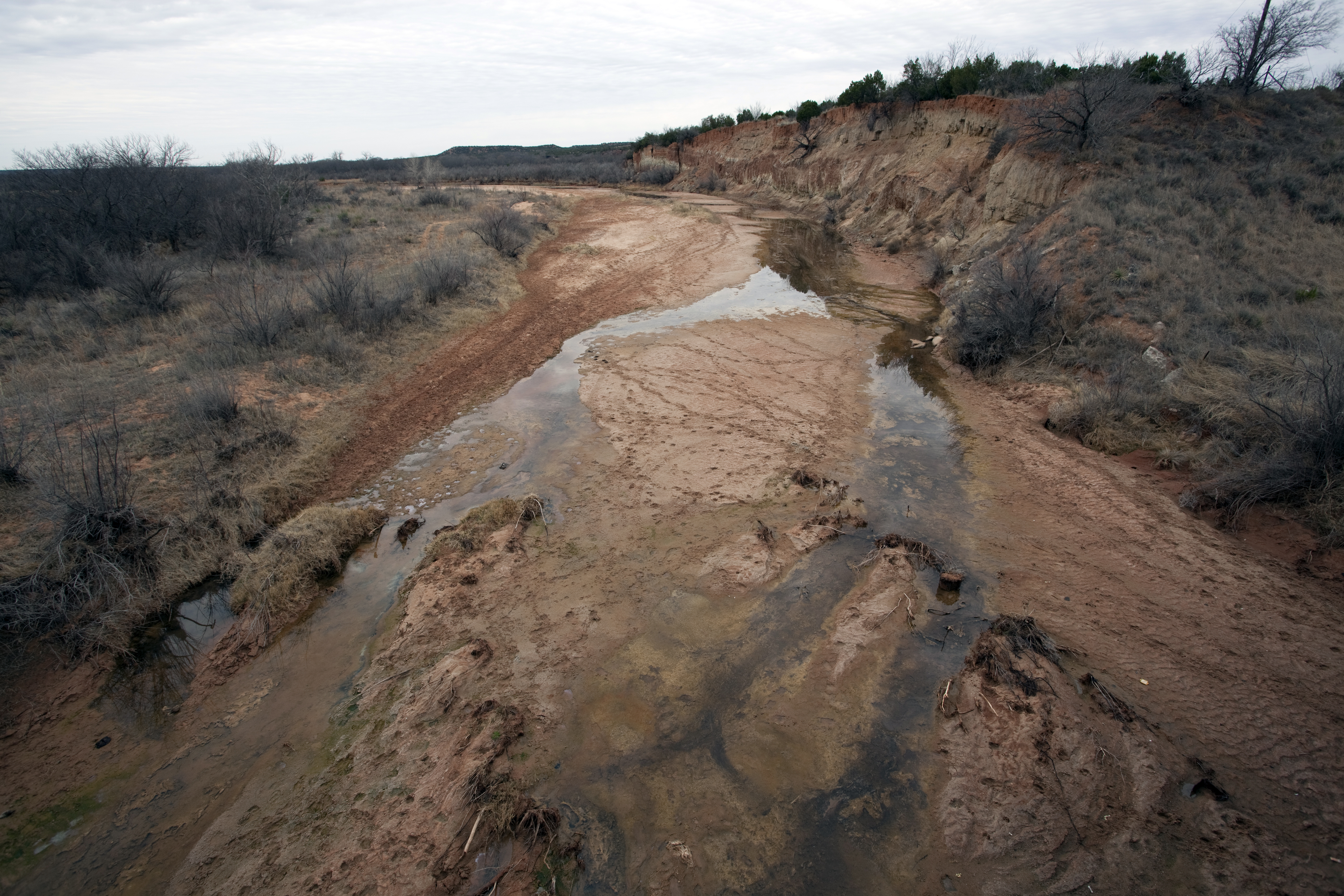
North Pease River, Cottle County, Texas

In general, Texas groundwater storage is projected to decrease due to the declining groundwater recharging rate under climate change. A warmer and drier climate can lead to larger evaporation as well as less water for recharging groundwater aquifers especially in Western Texas where aquifers were already under significant pressure.

Meanwhile, in a warmer climate, drier soil due to increasing evaporation is expected to lower the efficiency of agricultural irrigation, which might increase the groundwater pumping for irrigation. Furthermore, to feed the rapidly growing population in Texas, the potential stress on groundwater can have negative impacts on aquifer yield and surface water resources. Therefore, the aridity and water scarcity is very likely to be exacerbated across Texas in the future.

By the end of this century, the Edwards Aquifer is expected to experience obvious decrease (around 20% - 30%) in recharge while the water demand would rise significantly in this region due to the fast population growth, which could leads to unprecedently reduced streamflow at local spring system.

=== Wildfires ===
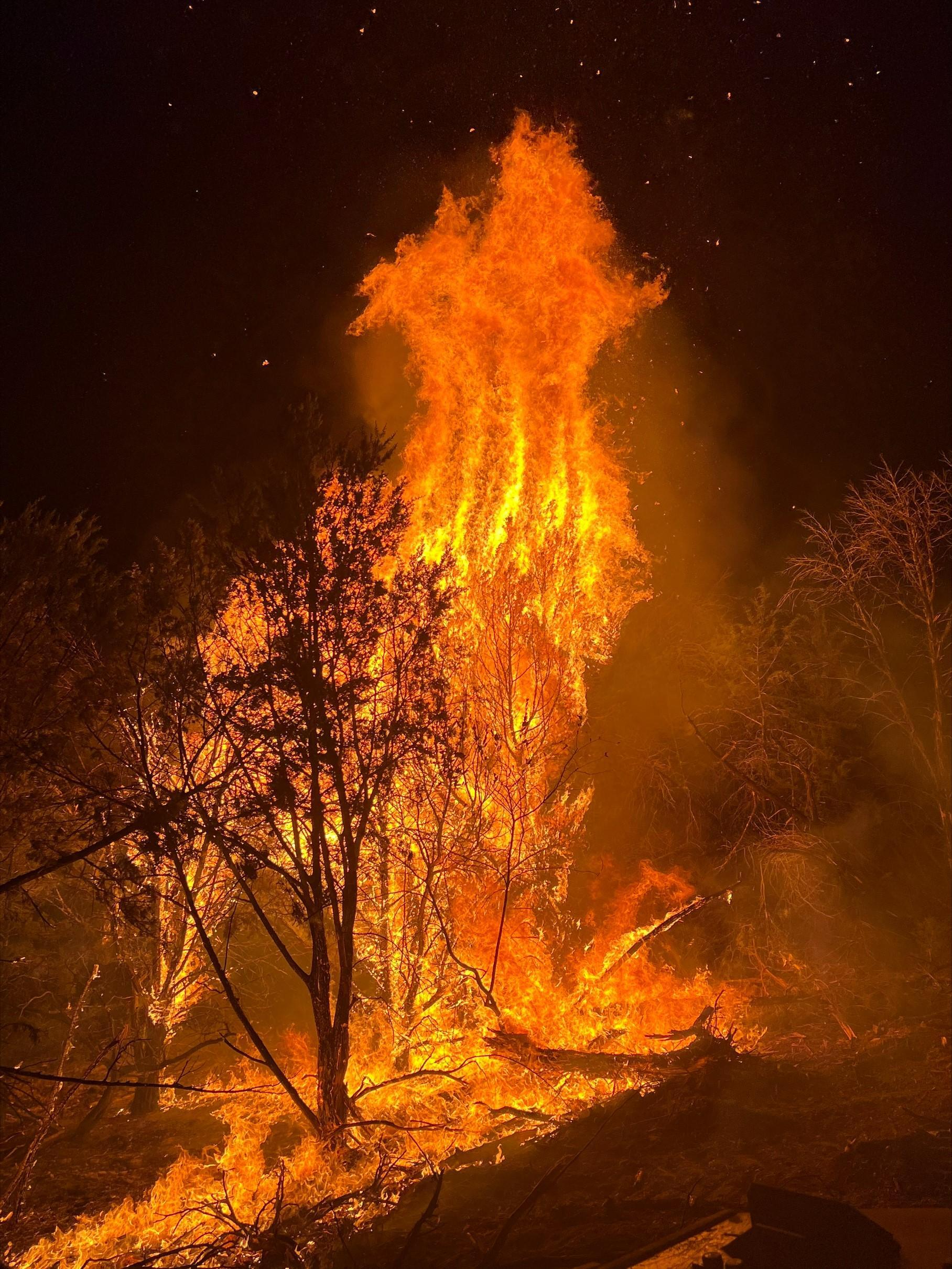
Chalk Mountain wildfire, July 2022

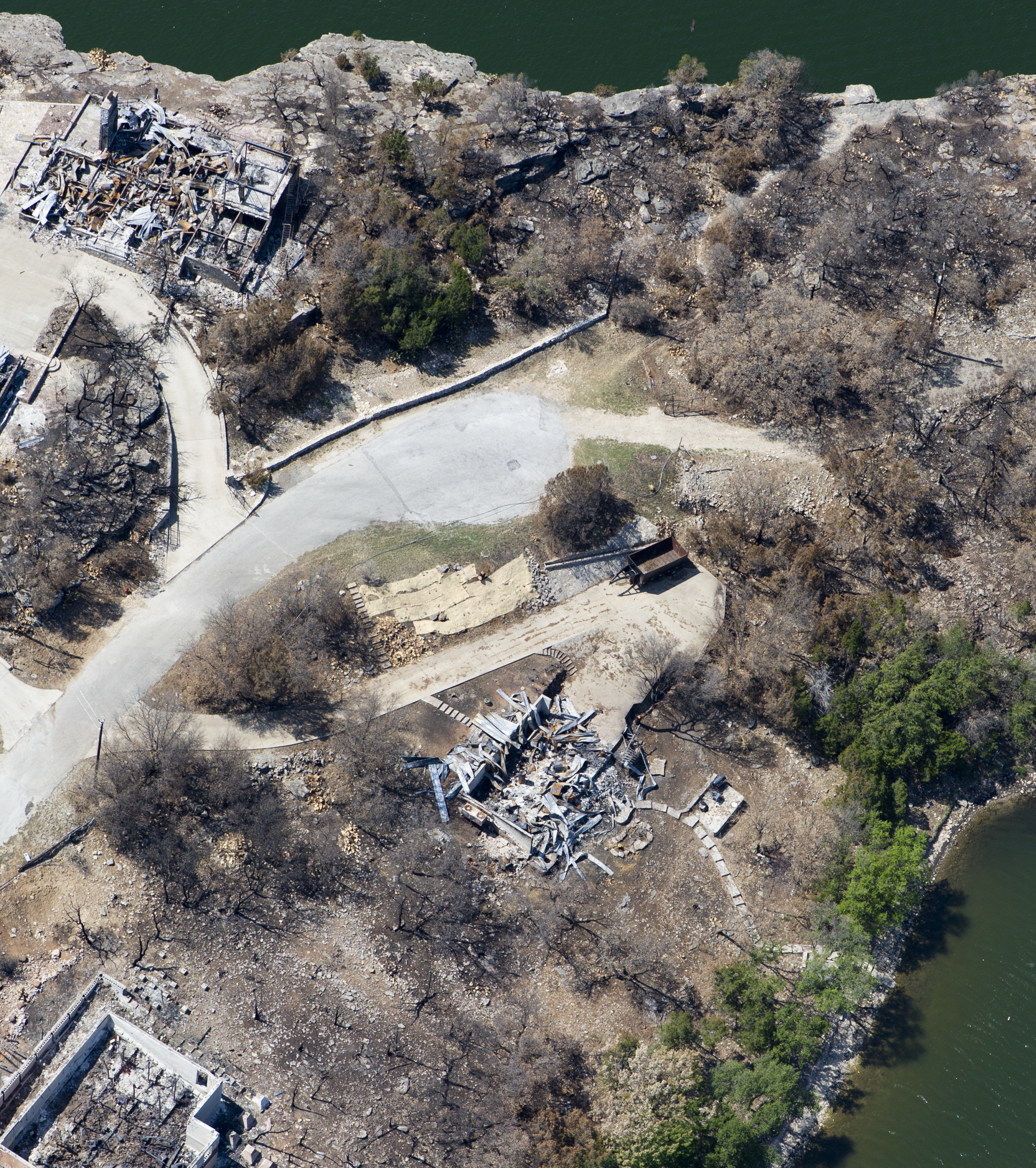
Destroyed houses, Possum Kingdom wildfire, 2011.

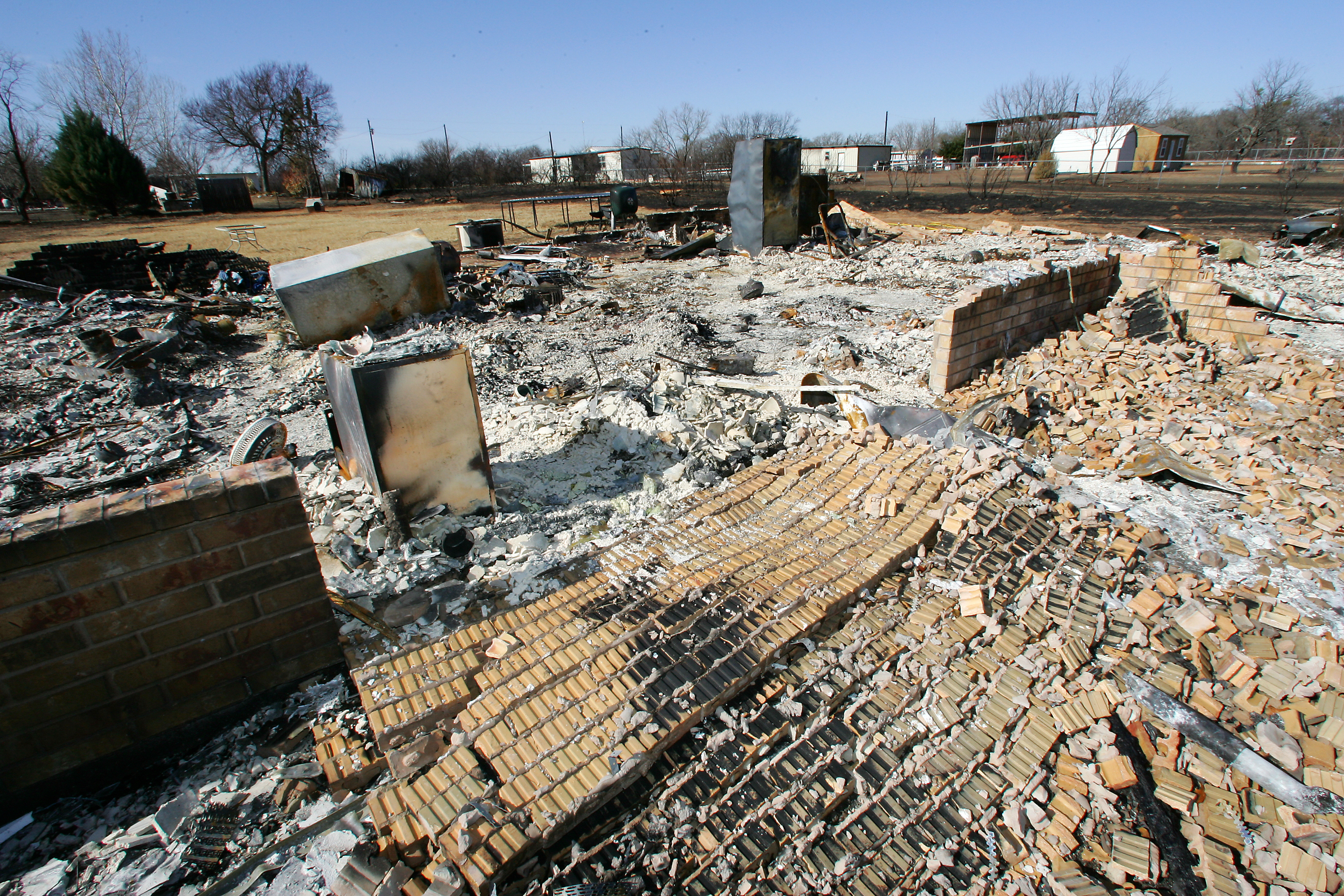
Wildfire aftermath, Canyon Creek

According to the EPA, "higher temperatures and drought are likely to increase the severity, frequency, and extent of wildfires." According to Wes Moorehead, fire chief at the Texas A&M Forest Service, "Wildfire in Texas does seem to be a growing problem. We see more and more wildfires, it seems like, every year." As of 2022, Texas has the second highest wildfire risk in the United States. According to research by Texas A&M University, climate and weather trends in Texas are increasing the wildfire risk, although perhaps less so in West Texas.

=== Effects on health ===
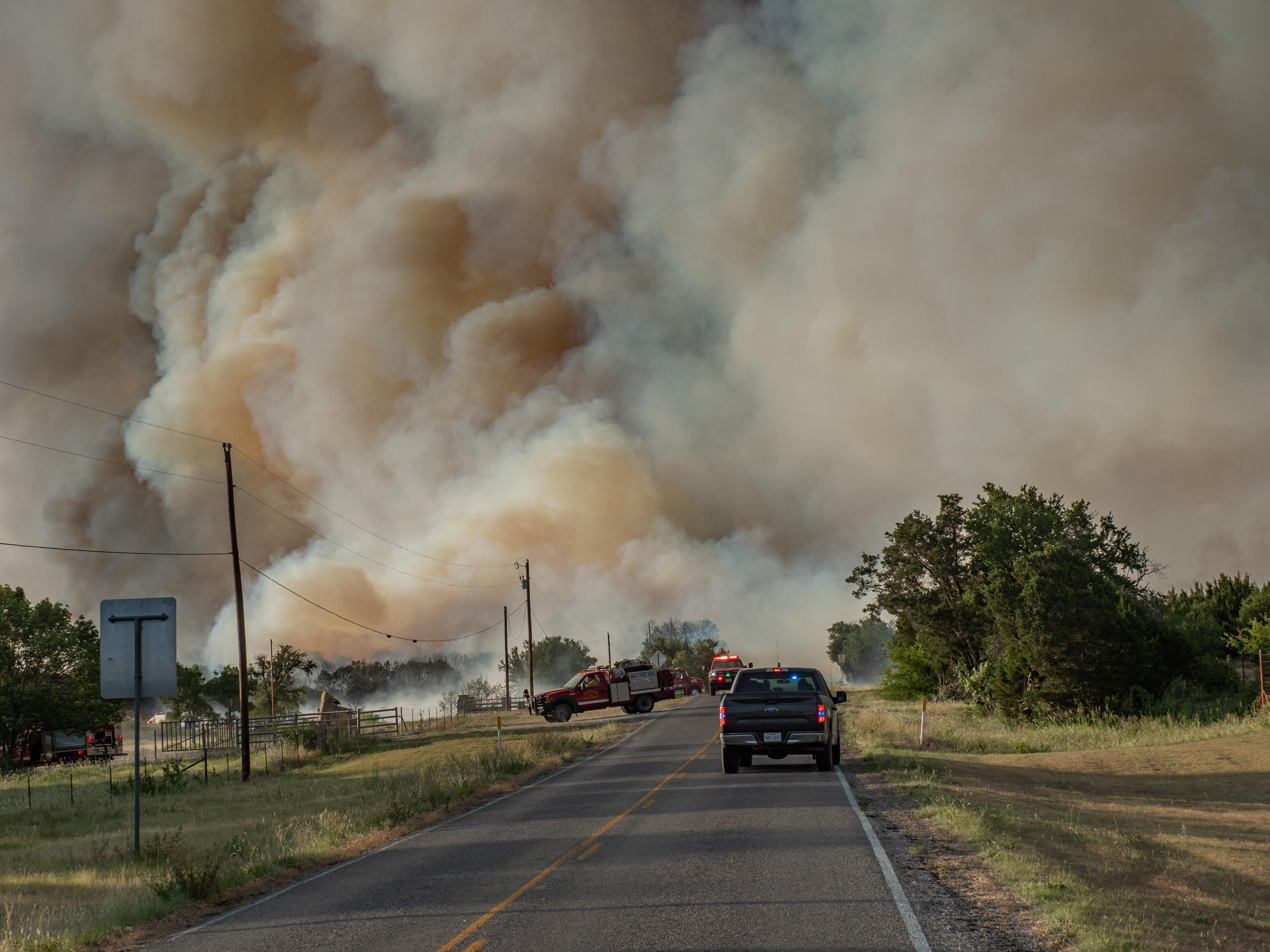
Smoke pollution from wildfires, Palo Pinto County, July 2022

Hot weather in the state can cause adverse health effects on vulnerable populations, like heat stroke and dehydration, which could affect people's cardiovascular and nervous systems. Warmer air also increases the production of ground-level ozone, which can worsen lung diseases like asthma, and can also cause heart disease, increasing the danger of premature death. Changes in the climate are also increasing more instances of seasonal allergies. The heat periods are lasting longer because of climate change. The summers are starting sooner and lasting longer, which is creating longer periods of stronger heat. Climate change can also have an indirect impact on mental health. With climate change, there can be an increase in hurricanes and major flood events. This leads to changes in infrastructure which may force people to leave their homes and lose their belongings. Dealing with the loss of your home and personal belongings can take a toll on one's mental health creating more stress and anxiety in their lives.

More extreme storms have also taken a toll on Texans' mental health, particularly those who have survived Hurricane Harvey. Weeks after Harvey hit the state, researchers were surveying across the hardest-hit areas, and found that 46 percent of Houston area participants met the necessary symptoms for PTSD. More than half of the 41 survivors in the survey had symptoms of anxiety.

Extreme changes in temperature and precipitation increases the spread of vector borne diseases such as the West Nile Virus and Lyme disease. These extreme temperature changes also increase water temperature that can lead to more bacteria growth and more food borne diseases like Salmonella.

== Action to address climate change ==
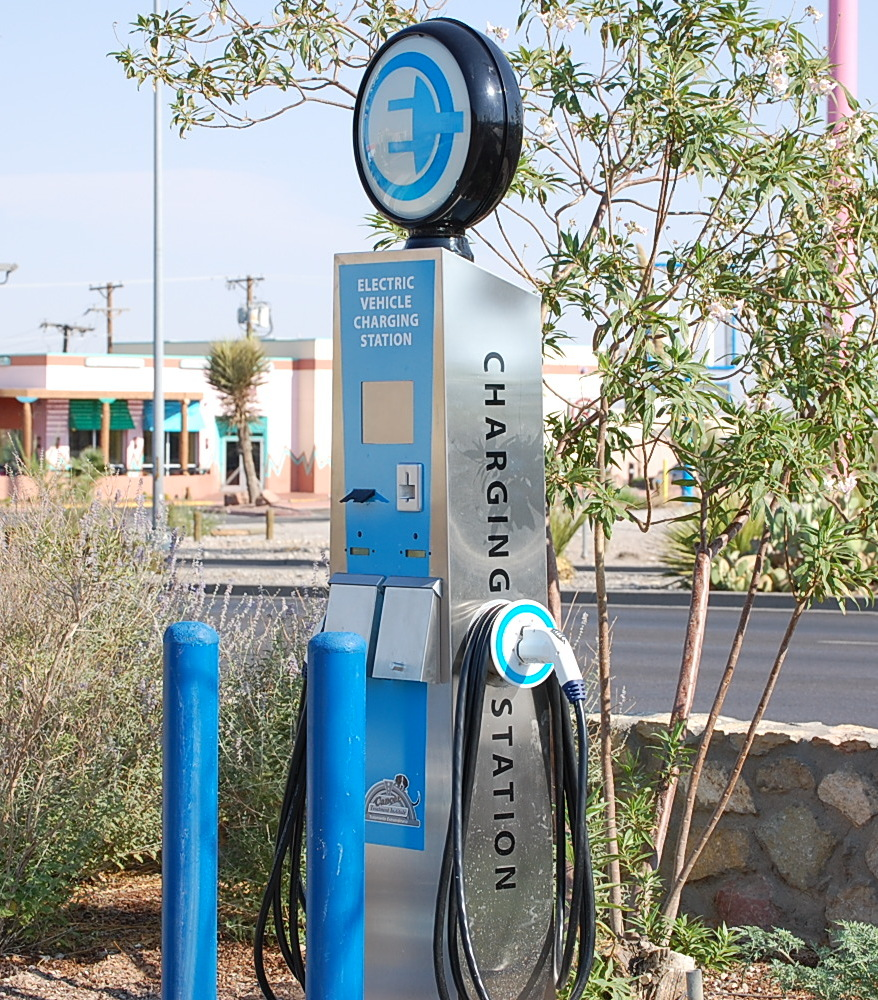
Electric vehicle charger, El Paso

=== City action ===
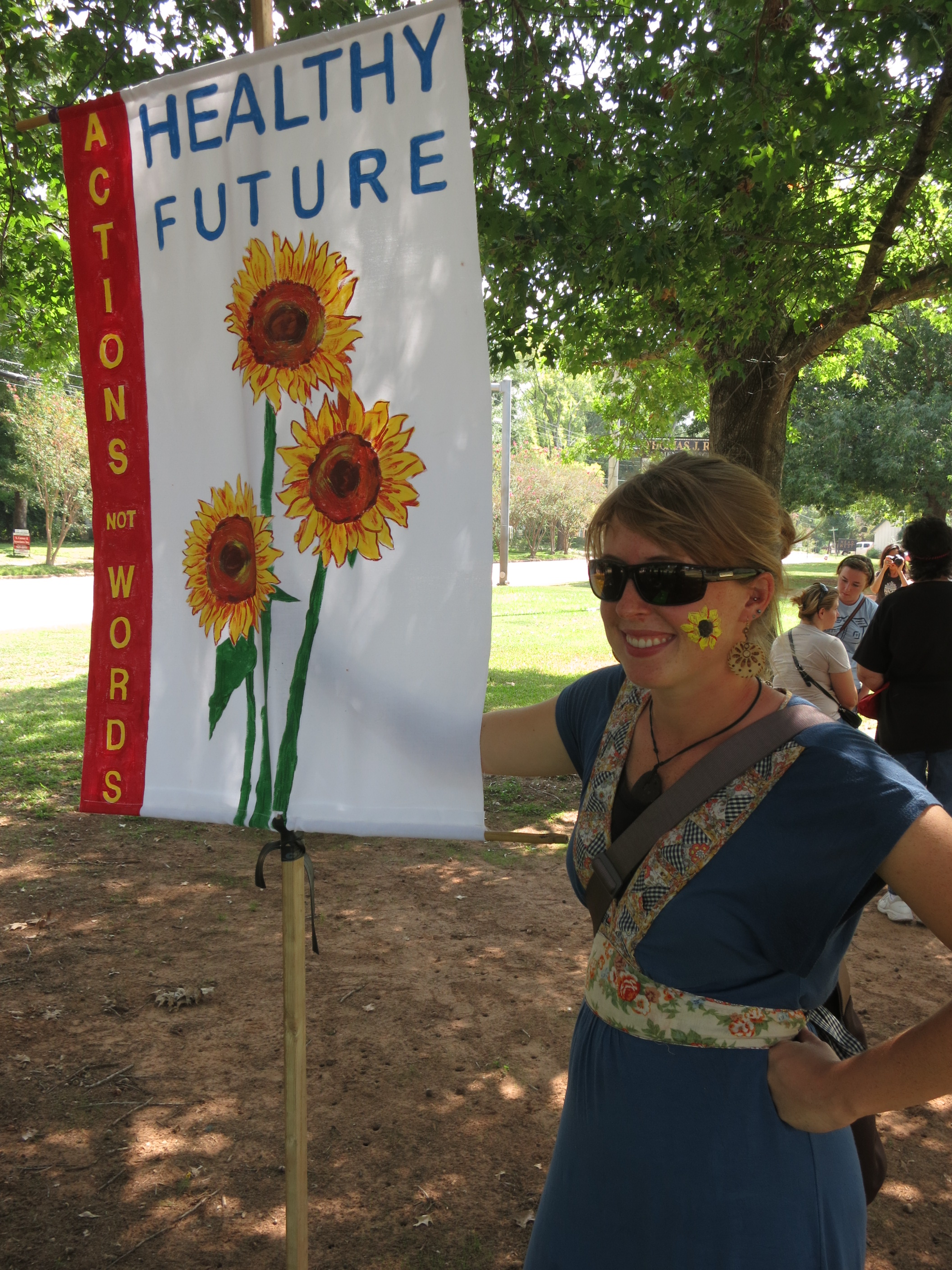
Climate Justice Walk, Houston 2014

Texas has the following Clean Cities coalitions:

- Alamo Area Clean Cities
- Loan Star Clean Fuels Alliance (Central Texas)
- Dallas–Fort Worth Clean Cities
- Greater Houston Clean Cities

Georgetown, Texas was powered 100% by renewable energy.

=== Climate Action Plans ===
==== Austin ====
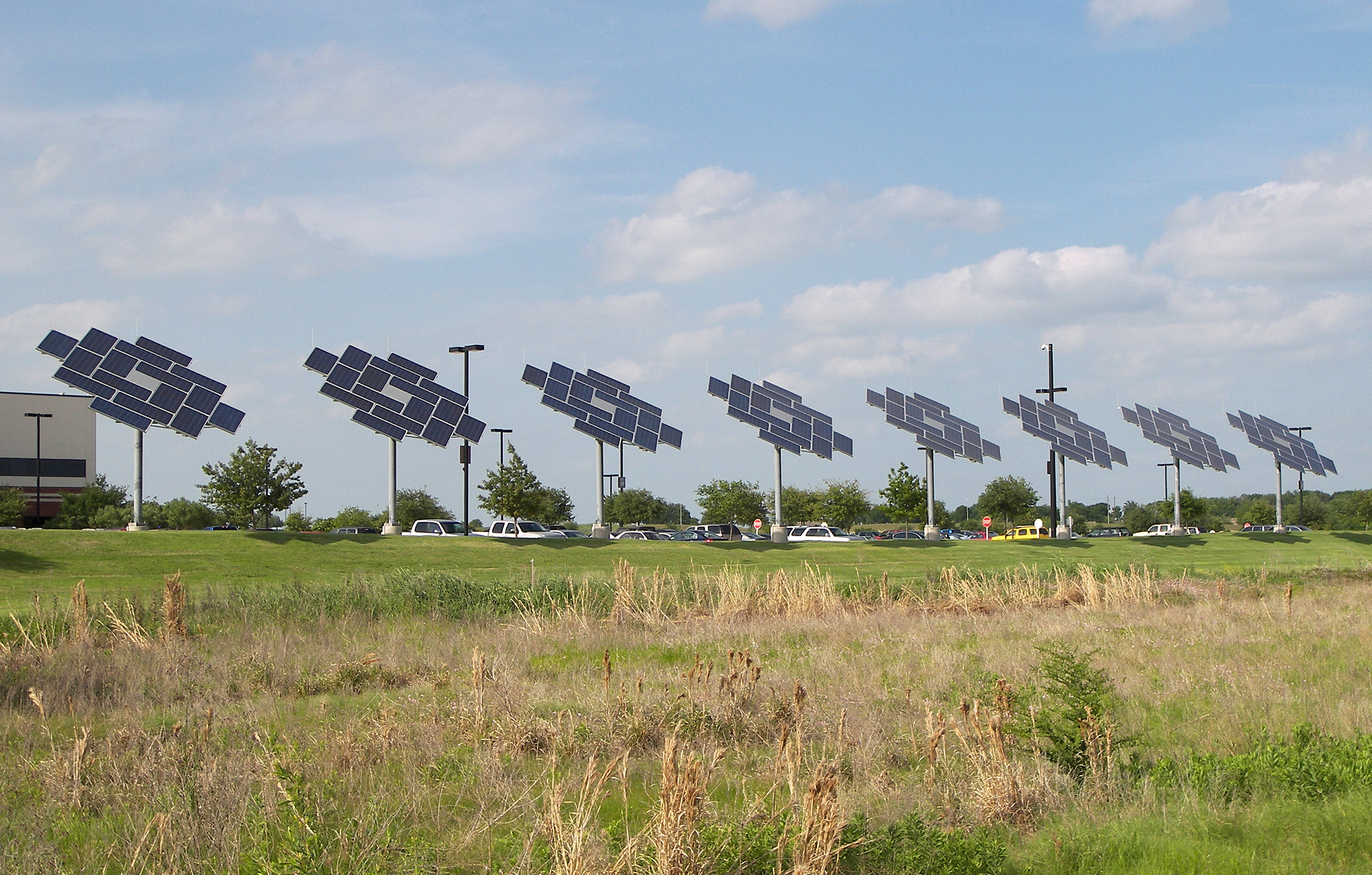
Solar array, Austin

Austin developed the Austin Community Climate Plan in 2015 with goals to become carbon neutral in 2050. The plan details numerous actions that should be taken by the Electricity and Natural Gas, Transportation and Land Use, and Material and Waste Management Sectors to reduce greenhouse gases. It also identifies how different members of the community can fit in to this plan and what benefits it could provide to them such as lower energy costs and enhanced public transportation options.

==== Houston ====
Houston initiated the Houston Climate Action Plan on April 22, 2020 with the goal set by the Paris Climate Agreement to become carbon neutral by 2050. The plan has four focus areas: transportation, energy transition, building optimization, and materials management. They hope that the plan will provide other benefits besides reducing emissions such as savings from energy efficiency and less traffic congestion.

==== Dallas ====
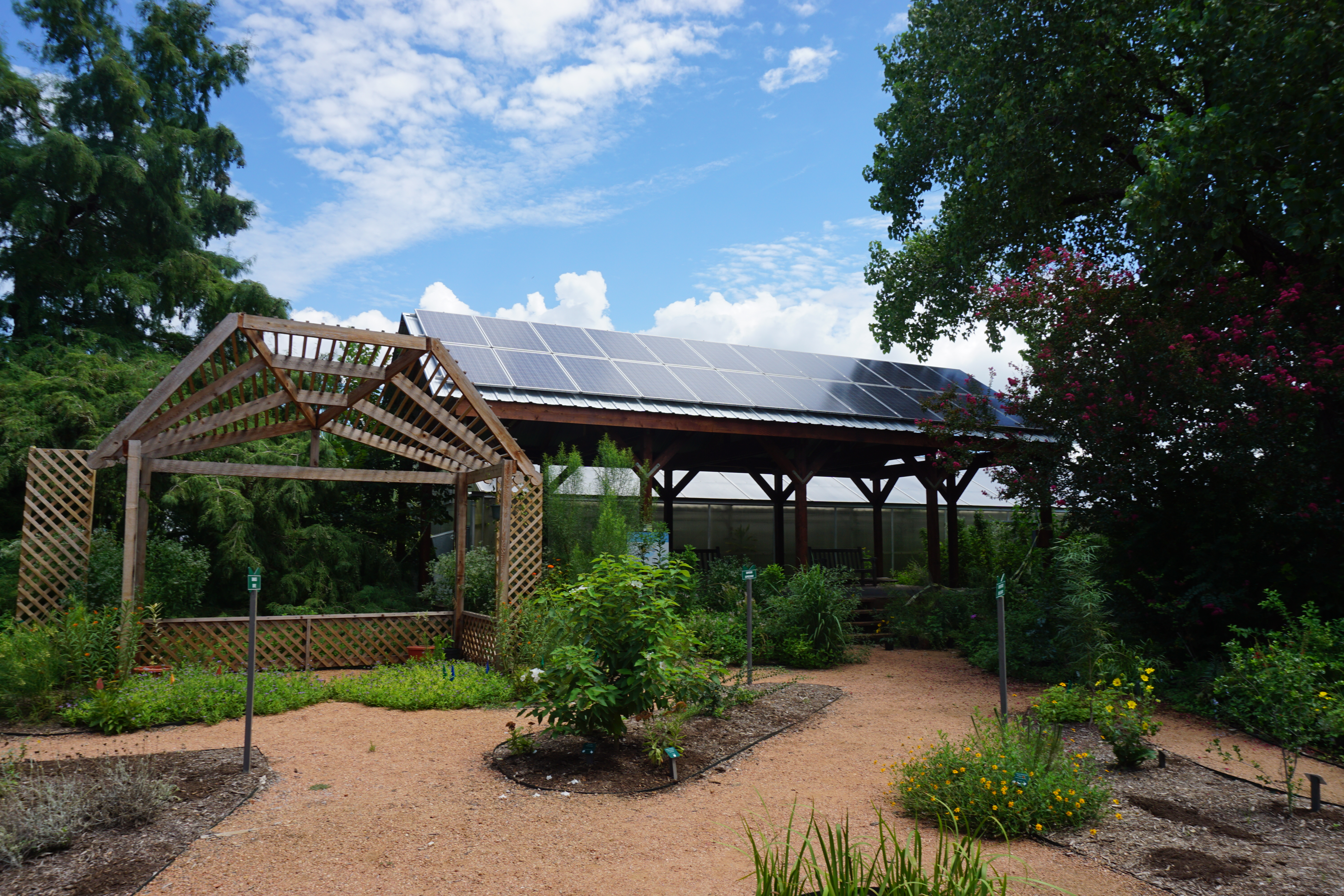
Solar panels, Fair Park

Dallas initiated the Dallas Comprehensive Environmental and Climate Action Plan on May 27, 2020 with the goal to reduce greenhouse gas emissions by 43% by 2030 and be carbon neutral by 2050. The plan outlines eight focus areas to reach its goals: renewable energy, energy efficient building construction, access to sustainable transportation, zero waste, water resource protection, green spaces, access to healthy and local food, and clean air. Through partnerships, grants and loans, legislation, green bonds, voluntary participations, and incentives, the city of Dallas plans to implement its proposed actions. However, teaching knowledge, leadership and policies are still lacking in the climate education system in Dallas–Fort Worth metroplex. Therefore, more approaches about climate education such as teacher professional development courses, community service learning as well as museum exhibits are encouraged over the region to improve public awareness about climate change.

==== San Antonio ====
San Antonio adopted the city's first Climate Action and Adaption Plan (CAAP) on October 17, 2019. As one of the fastest growing city in the U.S., San Antonio has been taking actions to reduce greenhouse gases and prepare for climate change. To achieve goals of climate change mitigation and climate change adaptation, a report about CAAP was developed by the local government to promote sustainable development.

=== Renewable energy ===
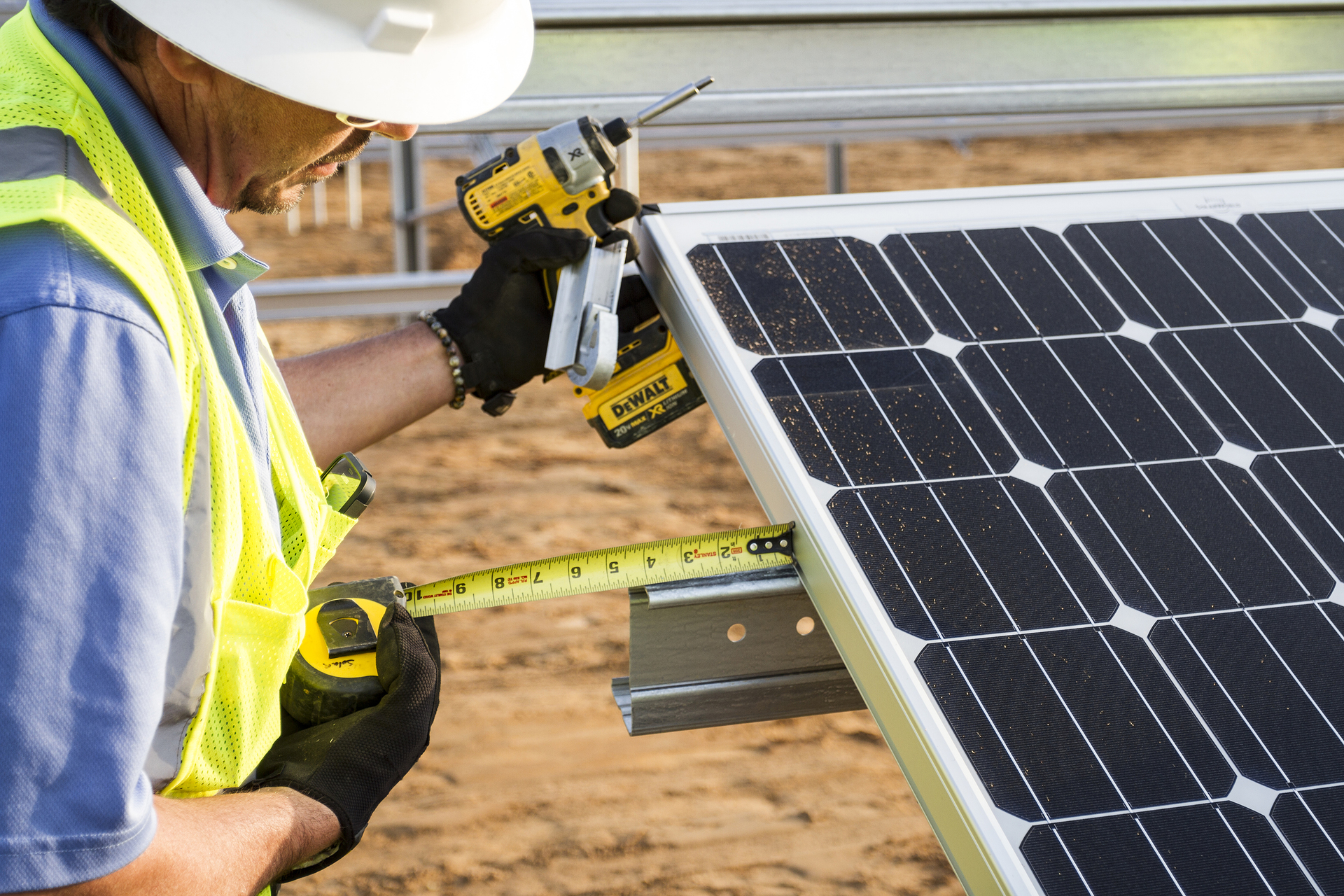
Solar panel installation, Krugerville

In general, Texas has a long history of conventional energy production (e.g., petroleum and natural gas) as well as a Republican-controlled state legislature. Unlike California, the majority of Texas legislature remains opposed to actions about addressing climate change. For example, the Senate Bill 2069 aiming at developing a climate adaptation plan over Texas was not implemented because the hearing was not held. However, the renewable energy industry has been rapidly growing in Texas. In 2016, there were around 7,000 solar industry jobs over Texas and the number of positions climbed to almost 10,000 in 2018. The number of Texas solar industry jobs in 2018 is around twice as much as those in Illinois but still far behind California. It indicates that Texas has high potential to develop more renewable energy in the future considering the advantages such as sunny weather, flat land and friendly business climate.

Texas can reduce greenhouse gas by developing renewable energy production but also could meet challenges because wind and solar energy are highly dependent on weather and their production is non-continuous. The first challenge is the electricity supply-demand balance. Solar irradiance is available during daytime and both solar and wind energy have daily and seasonal variability. The second challenge is the discrepancies of different regions (e.g., topography, land use, local operational decisions) over Texas, which can impact the renewable power generation and capacity. In Texas, the total generation of these two energy production is expected to grow around 2040 to 2050 compared to the period from 1995 to 2005. However, model results indicate that there are obvious spatial and temporal differences in the renewable energy distribution over Texas. Therefore, it is important to conduct studies using higher resolution data to facilitate the investigation of climate change influences on the potential of renewable power production in Texas.

==== Wind power ====
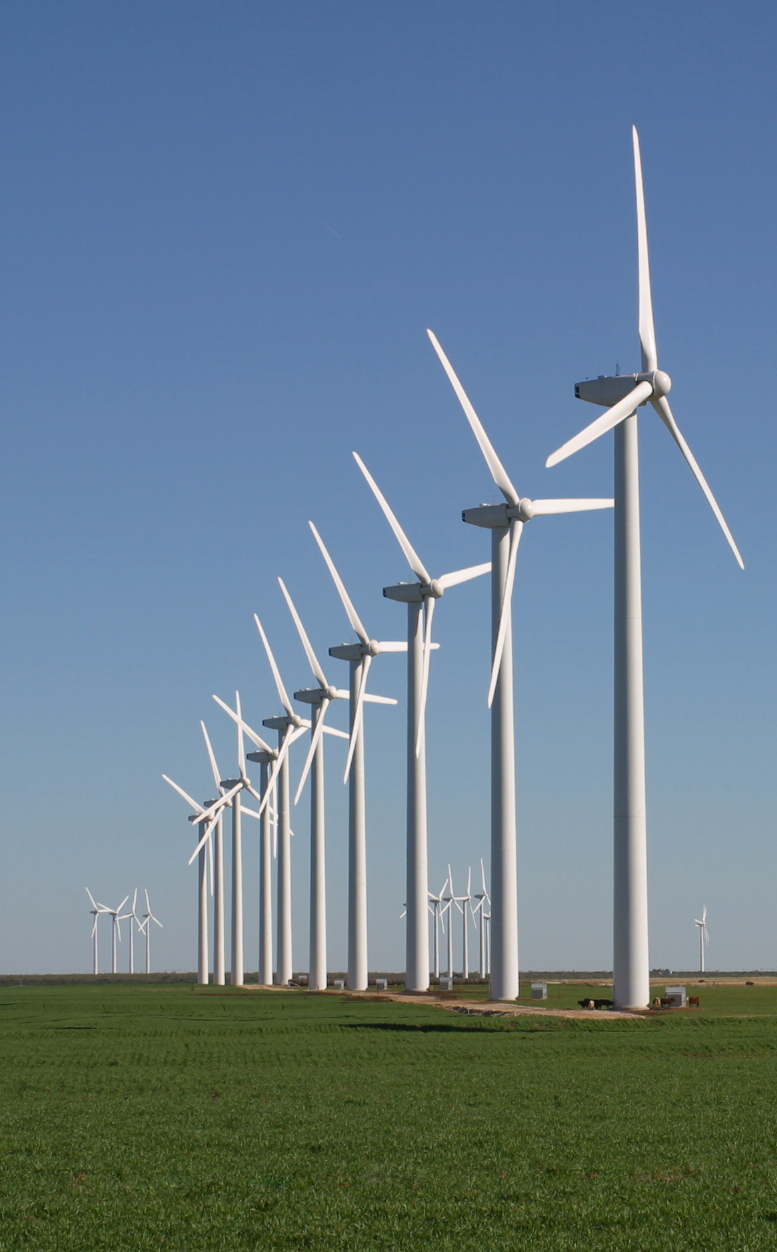
Brazos Wind Farm

Texas has been in the top-tier of wind energy production over the U.S. since 2000. According to the Electric Reliability Council of Texas (ERCOT), wind power accounted for at least 15.7 percent of the electricity generated in Texas during 2017. Wind power accounted for 17.4 percent of the electricity managed by ERCOT. Some wind farms have been built in West Texas in recent decades. The emerging wind farms not only reduced the air pollution but also benefited local land owners who leased or sold their land to the wind power generator as well as their neighborhood. Also, the local land owners had higher net income than before partly due to the declined county property tax rates. Moreover, the quality of local public schools has increased because of the immigration of higher educated people to the region.

The transmission of wind power is one of the biggest challenge because the best wind source is Texas Panhandle which is located in the northern part of Texas, but the load center is located in the eastern Texas. As for wind power, there were different perspectives about the transmission and the related challenges in Texas. For example, some stakeholders proposed that building more transmission infrastructure was necessary, which was opposed by some environmentalists. There were also concerns about the new complexity brought by building transmission infrastructure to the overall renewable energy market in Texas. In conclusion, Texas has strong natural wind energy resources and there exists increasing local and community supports regarding wind power development.

=== Grants ===
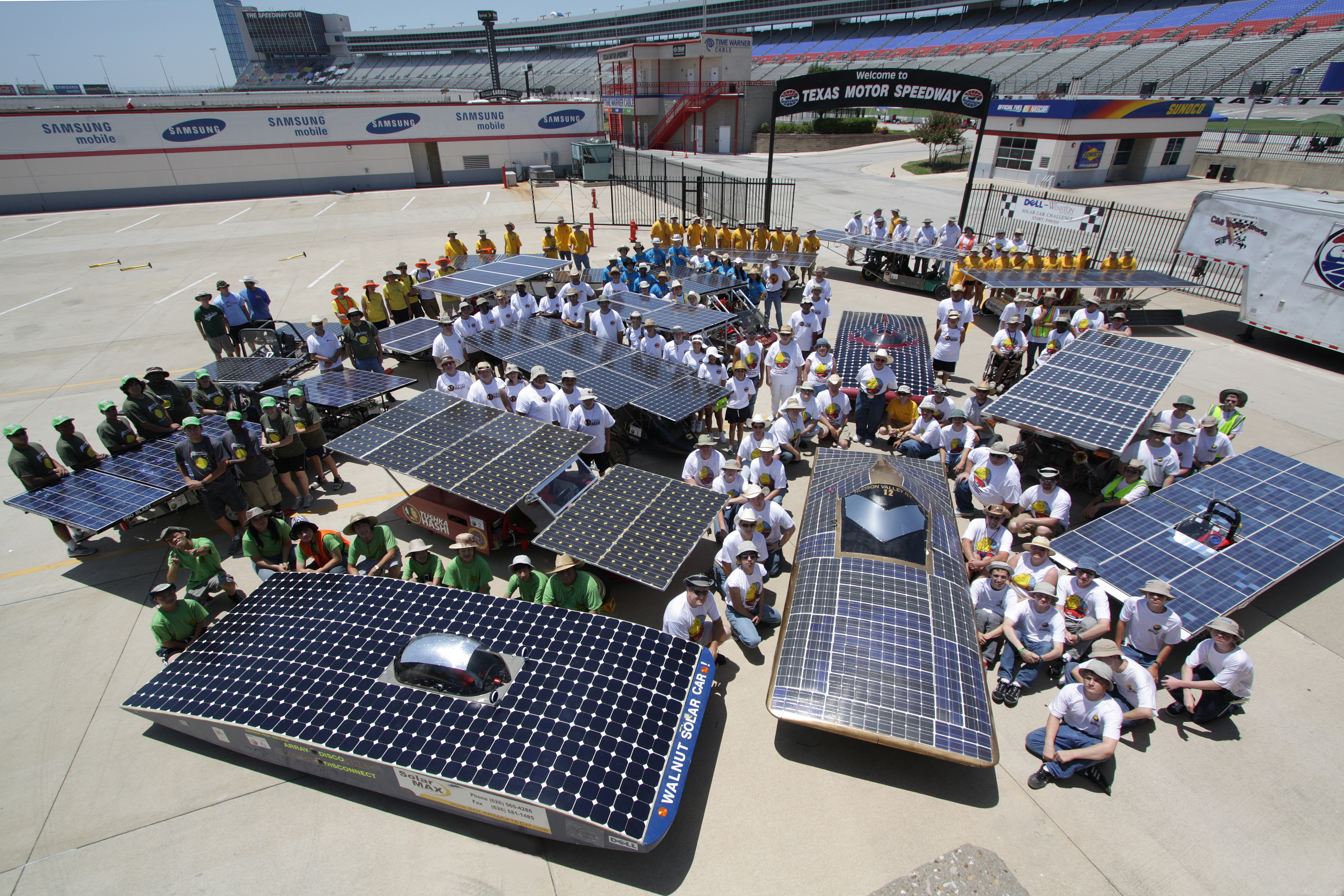
Solar car racing challenge, Texas Motor Speedway.

The Texas Emissions Reduction Plan (TERP) provides grants for alternative fuel and advanced technology demonstration and infrastructure projects. Under TERP, the New Technology Research and Development (NTRD) Program provides incentives to encourage and support research, development, and commercialization of technologies that reduce pollution in Texas. The NTRD Program is administered by the Texas Environmental Research Consortium, with support from the Houston Advanced Research Center which focuses on scientific and engineering-related research about sustainable development.

The Texas State Energy Conservation Office (SECO) researches and assists public and private entities in securing grants to encourage the use of alternative fuels. This includes the use of hybrid electric vehicles and the conversion of state and local government fleets to operate on compressed natural gas, liquefied petroleum gas, hydrogen, biodiesel, and bioethanol. SECO has programs such as Clean Energy Incubators, Alternative Fuel Program, Innovative Energy Demonstration Program as well as funding opportunities to help Texas cope with the potential impacts from climate change.

== See also ==
- Plug-in electric vehicles in Texas
