= Climate of Texas =

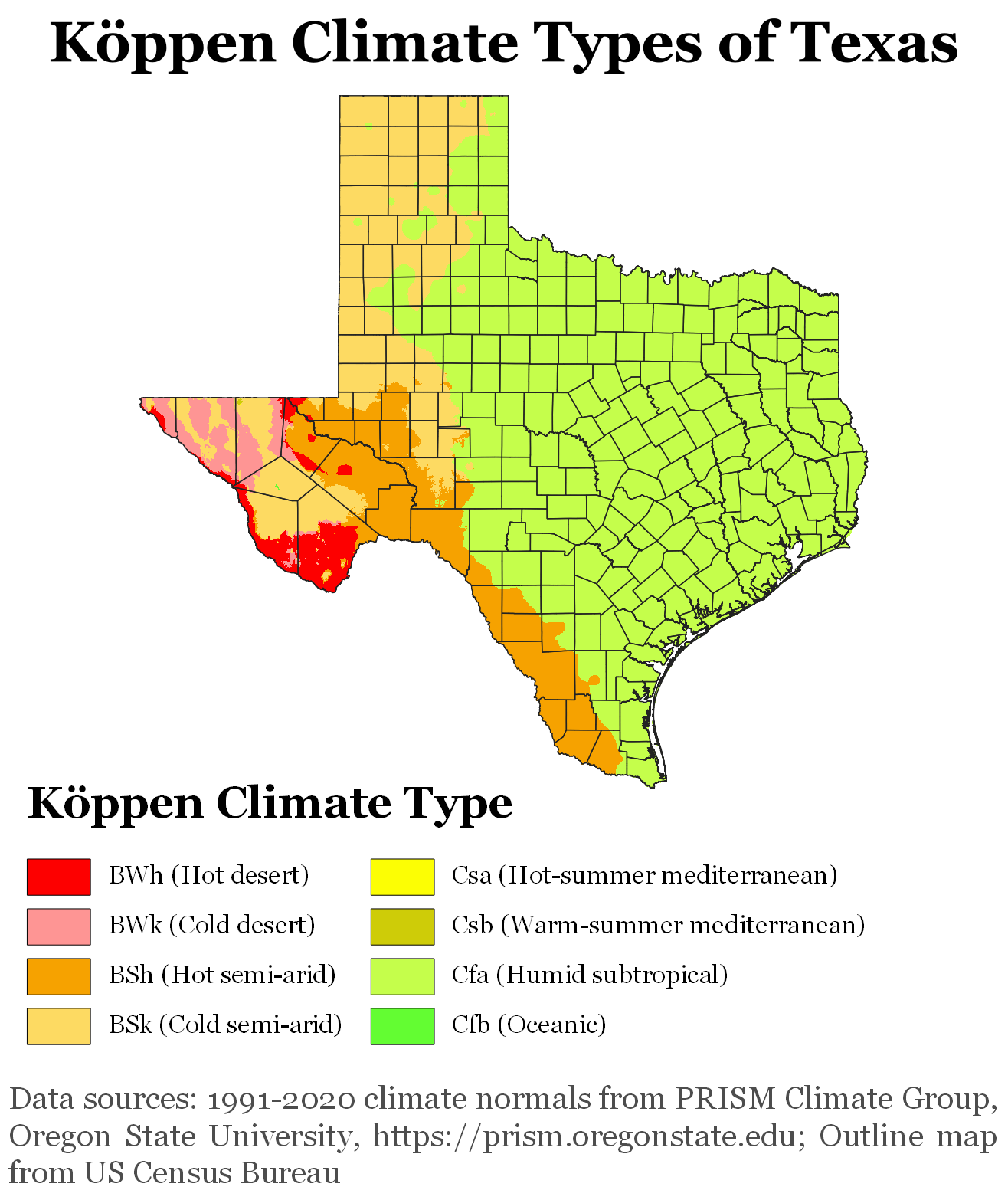
Köppen climate types of Texas, using 1991-2020 c.

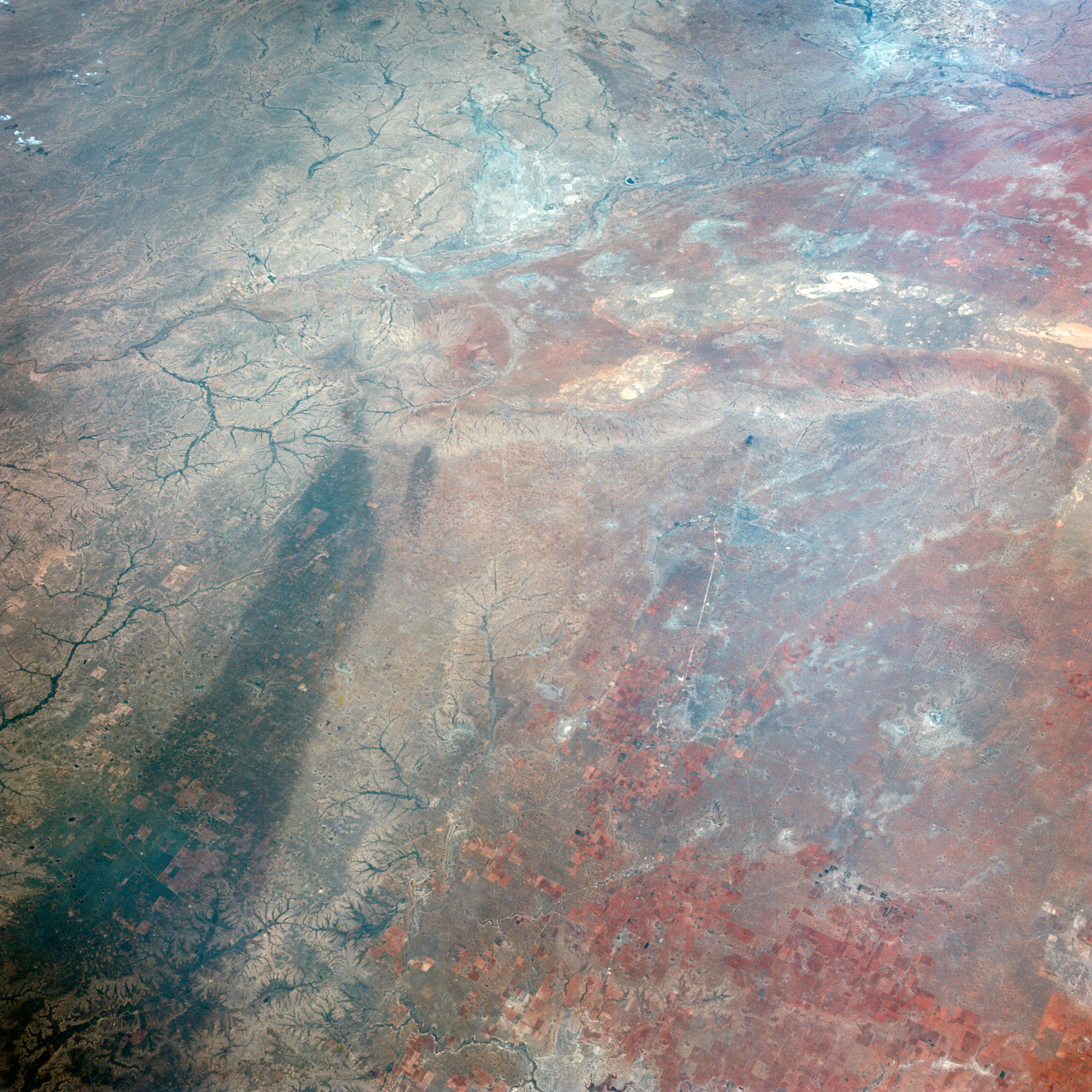
This image of Texas, obtained by astronauts aboard NASA's Gemini 4 spacecraft, shows a large dark swath attributed to rainfall.

Texas' weather varies widely, from arid in the west to humid in the east. The huge expanse of Texas encompasses several regions with distinctly different climates: Northern Plains, Trans-Pecos Region, Texas Hill Country, Piney Woods, and South Texas. Generally speaking, the eastern half of the state is humid subtropical, while the western half is largely semi-arid (except arid in the far west). This is because the North American Cordillera tends to block east-west winds, meaning north-south winds are common in eastern Texas and draw moist air off the Gulf of Mexico.

Texas ranks first in tornado occurrence with an average of 139 per year. Tropical cyclones can affect the state, either from the Gulf of Mexico or from an overland trajectory originating in the eastern Pacific Ocean. Those originating from the Gulf of Mexico are more likely to strike the upper Texas coast than elsewhere. Significant floods have occurred across the state throughout history, both from tropical cyclones and from stalled weather fronts.

== Extreme temperatures ==
Extreme temperatures in Texas have ranged from −23 °F (−30.6 °C) in Tulia on February 12, 1899 and in Seminole on February 8, 1933 to 120 °F (48.9 °C) in Seymour on August 12, 1936 and in Monahans on June 28, 1994. A reading of −30 °F (−34.4 °C) was unofficially recorded in Wolf Creek and a site southeast of Perryton on February 12, 1899. Texas holds the records for the highest temperature recorded in the United States for the months of January, February, March, April and December.

Climate data for Texas
Month	Jan	Feb	Mar	Apr	May	Jun	Jul	Aug	Sep	Oct	Nov	Dec	Year
Record high °F (°C)	99 (37)	107 (42)	108 (42)	113 (45)	116 (47)	120 (49)	119 (48)	120 (49)	116 (47)	112 (44)	102 (39)	99 (37)	120 (49)
Record low °F (°C)	−22 (−30)	−30 (−34)	−12 (−24)	5 (−15)	15 (−9)	32 (0)	40 (4)	39 (4)	25 (−4)	8 (−13)	−10 (−23)	−16 (−27)	−23 (−31)
Source: https://www.factmonster.com/math-science/weather/texas-temperature-extremes

=== Extreme highs ===
Month	Temperature	Date	Location
January	99 °F (37 °C)	January 1, 2022	Falcon Dam, Starr & Zapata County
February	107 °F (42 °C)	February 23, 2017	Falcon Dam, Starr & Zapata County
March	108 °F (42 °C)	March 14, 1902	Rio Grande City, Starr County
March	108 °F (42 °C)	March 31, 1954	Rio Grande City, Starr County
March	108 °F (42 °C)	March 27, 2020	Falcon Dam, Starr & Zapata County
March	108 °F (42 °C)	March 26, 2026	Rio Grande Village, Brewster County
April	113 °F (45 °C)	April 10, 1963	Falcon Dam, Starr & Zapata County
April	113 °F (45 °C)	April 20, 1984	Catarina, Dimmit County
May	116 °F (47 °C)	1989	Rio Grande Village, Brewster County
May	116 °F (47 °C)	May 9, 2024	Falcon Dam, Starr & Zapata County
June	120 °F (49 °C)	June 28, 1994	Monahans, Ward County
July	119 °F (48 °C)	1910	Tilden, McMullen County
August	120 °F (49 °C)	August 12, 1936	Seymour, Baylor County
September	116 °F (47 °C)	September 6, 2000	Columbus, Colorado County
October	112 °F (44 °C)	October 7, 1986	Poteet, Atascosa County
November	102 °F (39 °C)	November 4, 1988	McAllen, Hidalgo County
December	99 °F (37 °C)	December 30, 2024	Faith Ranch Airport, Dimmitt County

== Characteristics by region ==
=== Northern area ===
Monthly normal high and low temperatures (°F) for various Northern Plains cities
City	Jan	Feb	Mar	Apr	May	Jun	Jul	Aug	Sep	Oct	Nov	Dec
Abilene	55/32	61/37	69/44	77/52	85/61	91/69	95/72	94/71	87/64	78/54	65/42	57/34
Amarillo	49/23	54/27	62/34	71/42	79/52	87/61	91/65	89/64	82/56	72/45	58/32	50/24
Lubbock	52/24	58/29	66/36	75/45	83/56	90/64	92/68	90/66	83/58	74/47	62/35	53/26
Midland	60/29	66/34	74/41	82/48	89/58	94/65	96/68	94/67	88/61	80/51	68/39	61/31
San Angelo	58/29	63/34	71/42	79/50	86/59	91/66	95/70	94/68	88/63	79/51	67/39	59/31
Wichita Falls	52/29	58/34	67/41	76/49	84/59	92/68	97/72	96/71	88/64	77/52	64/40	54/31

The Northern Plains' climate is semi-arid and is prone to drought, annually receiving between 16 and 32 inches (410 and 810 mm) of precipitation, and average annual snowfall ranging between 15 and 30 inches (380 and 760 mm), with the greatest snowfall amounts occurring in the Texas panhandle and areas near the border with New Mexico. During the summer, this area of state sees the most clear days. Winter nights commonly see temperatures fall below the freezing mark, or 32 °F (0 °C). The wettest months of the year are April and May. Tornadoes, caused by the convergence of westerly and southerly prevailing winds during the late spring, are common, making the region part of Tornado Alley. Poor land management, drought, and high wind speeds can cause large dust storms, minimized in modern times by improved land-management practices, but most troublesome in the 1930s during the Dust Bowl period. The panhandle region, farthest from the Gulf of Mexico, experiences colder winters than the other regions of Texas, where occasional wintertime Arctic blasts can cause temperatures to plunge to well below freezing and bring snowy conditions.

International areas with comparable climate: Southern China; the Pampas of Argentina; New South Wales, Australia.

=== Trans Pecos Region ===
The Trans-Pecos region, also known as Big Bend Country, is in the west-central and western parts of the state, consisting of the Chihuahuan Desert, canyons, and isolated mountain ranges. During fall, winter, and spring, it experiences the most clear days statewide. It is also the driest receiving an average annual rainfall of only 16 inches (410 mm) or less. Snowfall is rare at lower elevations, although the highest mountain peaks are prone to heavy snowfalls during winter. The arid climate is the main reason for desertification of the land, but overgrazing is slowly widening the land area of that desert. In the mountain areas one can see coniferous forests in a wetter and more temperate environment. The wettest months in this region occur during the summer. Winds are strengthened as they are forced to push through canyons and valleys. In the flatter areas these winds are harvested into usable electricity.

Climate data for El Paso Int'l, Texas (1991–2020 normals, extremes 1879–present) (Note: Official records for El Paso kept January 1879 to June 1947 at downtown and at El Paso Int'l since July 1947. For more information, see Threadex)
Month	Jan	Feb	Mar	Apr	May	Jun	Jul	Aug	Sep	Oct	Nov	Dec	Year
Record high °F (°C)	80 (27)	86 (30)	96 (36)	98 (37)	105 (41)	114 (46)	112 (44)	112 (44)	106 (41)	96 (36)	87 (31)	80 (27)	114 (46)
Mean maximum °F (°C)	71.2 (21.8)	76.9 (24.9)	85.9 (29.9)	90.7 (32.6)	98.7 (37.1)	105.7 (40.9)	103.6 (39.8)	102.5 (39.2)	98.8 (37.1)	90.8 (32.7)	78.5 (25.8)	71.3 (21.8)	106.7 (41.5)
Mean daily maximum °F (°C)	58.6 (14.8)	64.1 (17.8)	71.9 (22.2)	80.0 (26.7)	88.7 (31.5)	97.1 (36.2)	95.8 (35.4)	94.0 (34.4)	88.3 (31.3)	79.4 (26.3)	67.0 (19.4)	57.8 (14.3)	78.6 (25.9)
Daily mean °F (°C)	46.5 (8.1)	51.5 (10.8)	58.7 (14.8)	66.6 (19.2)	75.4 (24.1)	83.9 (28.8)	84.4 (29.1)	82.9 (28.3)	76.9 (24.9)	66.7 (19.3)	54.5 (12.5)	46.1 (7.8)	66.2 (19.0)
Mean daily minimum °F (°C)	34.5 (1.4)	38.9 (3.8)	45.5 (7.5)	53.3 (11.8)	62.1 (16.7)	70.6 (21.4)	73.0 (22.8)	71.8 (22.1)	65.4 (18.6)	54.0 (12.2)	42.0 (5.6)	34.4 (1.3)	53.8 (12.1)
Mean minimum °F (°C)	19.1 (−7.2)	22.6 (−5.2)	27.6 (−2.4)	35.8 (2.1)	46.7 (8.2)	56.6 (13.7)	63.9 (17.7)	62.8 (17.1)	52.6 (11.4)	37.8 (3.2)	25.1 (−3.8)	17.9 (−7.8)	15.6 (−9.1)
Record low °F (°C)	−8 (−22)	1 (−17)	14 (−10)	23 (−5)	31 (−1)	46 (8)	56 (13)	52 (11)	41 (5)	25 (−4)	1 (−17)	−5 (−21)	−8 (−22)
Average precipitation inches (mm)	0.39 (9.9)	0.40 (10)	0.24 (6.1)	0.17 (4.3)	0.43 (11)	0.73 (19)	1.58 (40)	1.67 (42)	1.52 (39)	0.59 (15)	0.43 (11)	0.63 (16)	8.78 (223)
Average snowfall inches (cm)	0.8 (2.0)	0.2 (0.51)	0.0 (0.0)	0.0 (0.0)	0.0 (0.0)	0.0 (0.0)	0.0 (0.0)	0.0 (0.0)	0.0 (0.0)	0.0 (0.0)	0.5 (1.3)	1.3 (3.3)	2.8 (7.1)
Average precipitation days (≥ 0.01 in)	3.3	3.1	2.1	1.4	2.4	3.4	8.1	7.8	5.5	4.1	2.6	3.8	47.6
Average snowy days (≥ 0.1 in)	0.7	0.3	0.0	0.0	0.0	0.0	0.0	0.0	0.0	0.1	0.2	0.8	2.1
Average relative humidity (%)	50.5	41.6	32.4	26.9	27.1	29.9	43.9	48.4	50.5	47.1	46.1	51.5	41.3
Average dew point °F (°C)	23.4 (−4.8)	23.0 (−5.0)	22.8 (−5.1)	25.5 (−3.6)	32.4 (0.2)	41.9 (5.5)	54.9 (12.7)	55.8 (13.2)	51.6 (10.9)	39.9 (4.4)	29.3 (−1.5)	24.6 (−4.1)	35.4 (1.9)
Mean monthly sunshine hours	254.5	263.0	326.0	348.0	384.7	384.1	360.2	335.4	304.1	298.6	257.6	246.3	3,762.5
Percentage possible sunshine	80	85	88	89	90	90	83	81	82	85	82	79	85
Source: NOAA (relative humidity 1962–1990, sun 1961–1990, dew point 1962–1990)

International areas with comparable climate: Iraq; Iran; Sahel region in Africa

=== Hill Country ===
Monthly normal high and low temperatures (°F) for Hill Country cities
City	Jan	Feb	Mar	Apr	May	Jun	Jul	Aug	Sep	Oct	Nov	Dec
Austin	60/40	65/44	73/51	79/58	85/65	91/71	95/73	96/73	90/69	81/60	70/49	62/42
San Antonio	62/39	67/43	74/50	80/57	86/66	91/72	95/74	95/74	90/69	82/59	71/49	64/41
Waco	57/33	62/38	70/46	78/53	84/63	91/70	96/74	96/73	90/66	79/57	68/45	59/36

The Texas Hill Country, or central Texas is shaped by its many rivers and hills. The climate is semi-arid west of Brady through Junction to Rocksprings, but it is sub-humid east and south of that area; both areas have hot summers and mild winters with occasional cold spells. Humidity is high during the warm season, though afternoons especially further northwest can see a wind shift and drier air before Gulf air returns after sunset. The vegetation is both broadleaf evergreen and deciduous in the river valleys, and coniferous where there is greater elevation. Dry savannas, open woodlands, and shorter grasses dominate the northwest, while closed woodlands and moist savannas mix with taller grasses in the east and south. In a single year the region can receive up to 48 inches (1,200 mm) of precipitation, and flooding is common near rivers and in low-lying areas, while drier years might receive only 12 inches (300 mm) of precipitation; average annual precipitation ranges from 21 inches (530 mm) in western sections up to 35 inches (890 mm) in southeast. The wettest months of the year are April and May.

International areas with comparable climate: Israel; Lebanon

=== Piney Woods ===
Monthly normal high and low temperatures (°F) for various Piney Woods locations
City	Jan	Feb	Mar	Apr	May	Jun	Jul	Aug	Sep	Oct	Nov	Dec
Dallas	55/36	61/41	69/49	77/56	84/65	92/73	96/77	96/76	89/69	79/58	66/47	57/39
Fort Worth	55/31	61/36	68/44	76/52	83/61	91/69	97/72	96/72	89/65	79/55	67/44	58/35
Galveston	62/50	64/52	70/58	75/65	81/72	87/78	89/80	89/79	87/76	80/68	71/59	64/52
Houston	63/45	67/48	74/55	79/61	86/68	91/74	94/75	93/75	89/72	82/62	73/53	65/47
Port Arthur	61/43	65/46	72/52	78/59	84/66	89/72	92/74	92/73	88/69	80/60	71/51	64/45

The Piney Woods is the eastern region of Texas and is within the humid subtropical climate zone. It receives the most rainfall; more than 60 inches (1,500 mm) annually in the far east. This is due to the gulf currents that carry humid air to the region, where it condenses and precipitates out in the vicinity of sea breeze fronts as well as when extratropical cyclones move by. While coastal sections see the most cloudy days statewide and year-round, northern sections see the most clear days during the summer. The wettest months of the year are April and May. The area is prone to severe thunderstorms and tornadoes when the proper conditions exist, generally in the springtime. Hurricanes also strike the region, the most disastrous of which was the Galveston Hurricane of 1900. More recently Hurricane Rita pummeled the Golden Triangle of southeast Texas. The higher humidity of the region amplifies the feeling of heat during the summer. During winter and spring along the immediate coast, temperatures are kept cool by relatively cool gulf waters. Dense advection fog can form when warm air moves over the cool shelf waters during February and March, stopping ship traffic for days.

International areas with comparable climate: Taiwan; Philippines; much of the southern parts of Queensland, Australia

=== South ===
Monthly normal high and low temperatures (°F) for southern Texas cities
City	Jan	Feb	Mar	Apr	May	Jun	Jul	Aug	Sep	Oct	Nov	Dec
Brownsville	69/50	72/53	78/59	82/65	87/72	91/75	92/75	93/75	89/73	84/66	77/59	70/52
Corpus Christi	66/46	70/49	76/56	81/62	86/69	90/74	93/74	93/75	90/72	84/64	75/55	68/48
Del Rio	63/40	68/44	76/52	83/59	89/67	94/72	96/74	96/74	91/69	82/61	71/49	63/41
Laredo	68/44	73/48	82/56	89/63	95/70	100/74	102/75	99/75	93/71	86/63	76/53	68/45
Victoria	63/44	67/47	73/54	79/60	85/68	90/73	93/75	94/75	90/70	83/62	73/52	65/45

The region of South Texas includes the semiarid ranch country and the wetter Rio Grande Valley. Considered to be the southernmost tip of the American Great Plains region, the inland region has rainfall that is similar to that of the Northern Plains. The coastal areas are nearly warm most of the year due to currents of the Gulf of Mexico. Summers are hot and humid. Rain in the coastal region is more abundant than in the inland region, and subtropical forests line the Rio Grande. The wettest months of the year are April and May in western areas, but approaching the Gulf Coast, September becomes the year's wettest month on average. This owes to the threat from tropical weather systems, including hurricanes, which can bring torrential rains of 5 to 10 inches (130 to 250 mm) in one or two days. The resulting September monthly rainfall maximum prevails, for example, at Corpus Christi, South Padre Island and Brownsville. Inland, where it is drier, ranches dominate the landscape, characterized by thick spiny brush and grasslands. The winters in the inland region are variable, but usually mild to warm, with snow being an extremely rare occurrence. The summers are for the most part hot and dry, but at times can be humid when winds come off the Gulf of Mexico. Tornadoes can occur in this region, but are less frequent than in other parts of the state. The southernmost parts of the state closely border the tropical savanna climate of neighboring Tamaulipas, Mexico.

International areas with comparable climate: parts of northern Australia; much of Madhya Pradesh, India; far north Thailand

== Cold and snow ==
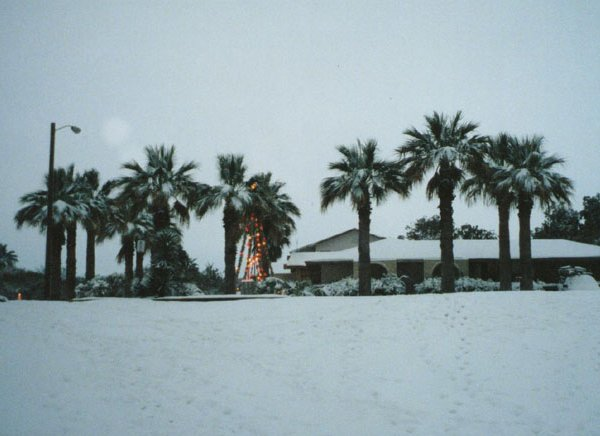
2004 Christmas Eve Snowstorm in South Texas

Northern and western sections of the state average snowfall annually due to their colder average readings each winter. For one week in February 1956, a snow storm of historic proportions struck northern Texas. The maximum amount measured was 61 inches (150 cm) at Vega with Plainview receiving 24 inches (61 cm) in one day. El Paso, in Far West Texas, received 22.4 in (57 cm) of snow during a 24-hour period December 13–14, 1987. For central and southern sections, snowfall is considerably more unusual. In February 1895, a large area of southeastern Texas received over 12 inches (30 cm) of snow, with peak amounts near 30 inches (76 cm) at Port Arthur. More recently around Christmas of 2004, up to 13 inches (33 cm) of snow fell along the middle coast, with the maximum occurring at Victoria.

One of the worst cold snaps to occur statewide occurred during the last half of December in 1983, causing 13 deaths in the state and 151 nationally. Four stations recorded their longest continuous readings at or below 32 °F (0 °C) on record. Lubbock saw temperatures at or below freezing for 9 days (207 hours). The Dallas-Fort Worth airport measured temperatures at or below freezing for a total of 296 consecutive hours (12 days). Snow which fell on December 14 and 15 across northern Texas stayed on the ground until New Year's Day of 1984.

February 2021 was another record-setting cold snap. At Austin, the temperature remained at or below freezing for 7 days (168 hours). At Abilene, the period at or below freezing totaled 10 days (252 hours). The Central Texas region, including Waco, Bryan, and Killeen, set a new record with 9 days (205 hours) at or below freezing. San Angelo endured 6 days (152 hours) at or below freezing temperatures. Because of insufficient hardening of infrastructure, the cold weather caused a statewide power shortage, cascading into shortages of food, water, and heat, and several hundred deaths.

== Severe weather ==
Thunderstorms are very common in Texas, especially the eastern and northern portion. Texas is part of the Tornado Alley section of the country. The state experiences the most tornadoes in the Union, an average of 139 a year. These strike most frequently in North Texas and the Panhandle. Tornadoes in Texas generally occur in April, May, and June.

=== Hurricanes ===
Texas's position at the northwestern end of the Gulf of Mexico makes it vulnerable to hurricanes. Some of the most destructive hurricanes in U.S. history have impacted Texas. A hurricane in 1875 killed approximately 400 people in Indianola, followed by another hurricane in 1886 that destroyed the town, which was at the time the most important port city in the state. This allowed Galveston to take over as the chief port city, but it was subsequently devastated by a hurricane in 1900 that killed approximately 8,000 people (possibly as many as 12,000), making it the deadliest natural disaster in U.S. history. Other devastating Texan hurricanes include the 1915 Galveston Hurricane, Hurricane Carla in 1961, Hurricane Beulah in 1967, Hurricane Alicia in 1983, Hurricane Rita in 2005, Hurricane Ike in 2008 and Hurricane Harvey in 2017.

The climatology of where tropical cyclone strikes are most likely within the state appears to be changing. In the early 1980s, the most favored region during the previous century was the middle coast. However, that region of the coastline has been rarely impacted since the 1960s, and a recent study indicates that the most vulnerable location to a tropical cyclone strike since 1851 is the upper coast, which has received 56 percent of all tropical cyclone landfalls, of which 66 percent originate from the Gulf of Mexico. This is in contrast with Louisiana and the lower Texan coast, where only 39 percent of the landfalls are from tropical cyclones of Gulf of Mexico origin.

=== Flooding ===
Annual average precipitation across Texas

The most serious threat from tropical cyclones for Texans is from flooding. The worst aspect about tropical cyclones is that the weaker they are, the more efficient they can be at producing heavy rains and catastrophic flooding. Systems with sprawling circulations, such as Hurricane Beulah, also tend to make good rainmakers. Slow moving systems, such as Tropical Storm Amelia (1978) and Hurricane Harvey (2017) can produce significant rainfall. Tropical cyclones from the eastern Pacific and Atlantic Basins can impact the Lone Star State. In general, flooding across Texas is more common during the spring and early autumn months, and it can also be due to nearby stationary fronts interacting with strong upper level cyclones. The most likely location for floods statewide is the Balcones Escarpment, an area of steep elevation gradient in central Texas at the boundary between the Edwards Plateau and the coastal plain.

=== Extreme temperatures ===
The highest temperature ever measured in Texas was 120 °F (48.9 °C), recorded on August 12, 1936 in Seymour, during the 1936 North American Heatwave, and again on June 28, 1994 in Monahans. The lowest temperature ever measured in Texas was −23 °F (−30.6 °C), recorded on February 8, 1933 in Seminole.

Climate data for Texas
Month	Jan	Feb	Mar	Apr	May	Jun	Jul	Aug	Sep	Oct	Nov	Dec	Year
Record high °F (°C)	98 (37)	104 (40)	108 (42)	113 (45)	116 (47)	120 (49)	119 (48)	120 (49)	116 (47)	110 (43)	102 (39)	98 (37)	120 (49)
Record low °F (°C)	−22 (−30)	−23 (−31)	−12 (−24)	5 (−15)	15 (−9)	32 (0)	40 (4)	39 (4)	25 (−4)	8 (−13)	−10 (−23)	−16 (−27)	−23 (−31)

== El Niño–Southern Oscillation ==
The El Niño–Southern Oscillation (ENSO) cycle is a huge impact on the weather in Texas. During the El Niño phase, the jet stream is located west-to-east across the southern portion of the United States. Therefore, winters in Texas are colder and receive more snowfall than normal. Texas is less likely to get impacted by hurricanes due to the increased wind shear across the Atlantic. Spring to early summer yields increased rainfall especially where a low pressure system is located over the Four Corners region or northern Mexico which yields monsoon-like climate (which was exacerbated during the 2015 and 2016 spring season where the City of Houston was the hardest hit as if the climate was similar to Mumbai or Kolkata, India with heavy rainfall usually from moisture from the Gulf of Mexico). During the opposite phase, La Niña, the jet stream is much further north, therefore winter is milder and drier than normal. Hurricanes are more likely to impact Texas during La Niña due to decreased wind shear in the Atlantic. Droughts in Texas are much more likely during La Niña. The 2010-11 La Niña is mostly to blame for one of the worst droughts in Texas history.

== Climate change ==
The climate in Texas is changing partially due to global warming and rising trends in greenhouse gas emissions. As of 2016, most area of Texas had already warmed by 1.5 °F (0.83 °C) since the previous century because of greenhouse gas emissions by the United States and other countries. Texas is expected to experience a wide range of environmental impacts from climate change in the United States, including rising sea levels, more frequent extreme weather events, and increasing pressure on water resources.

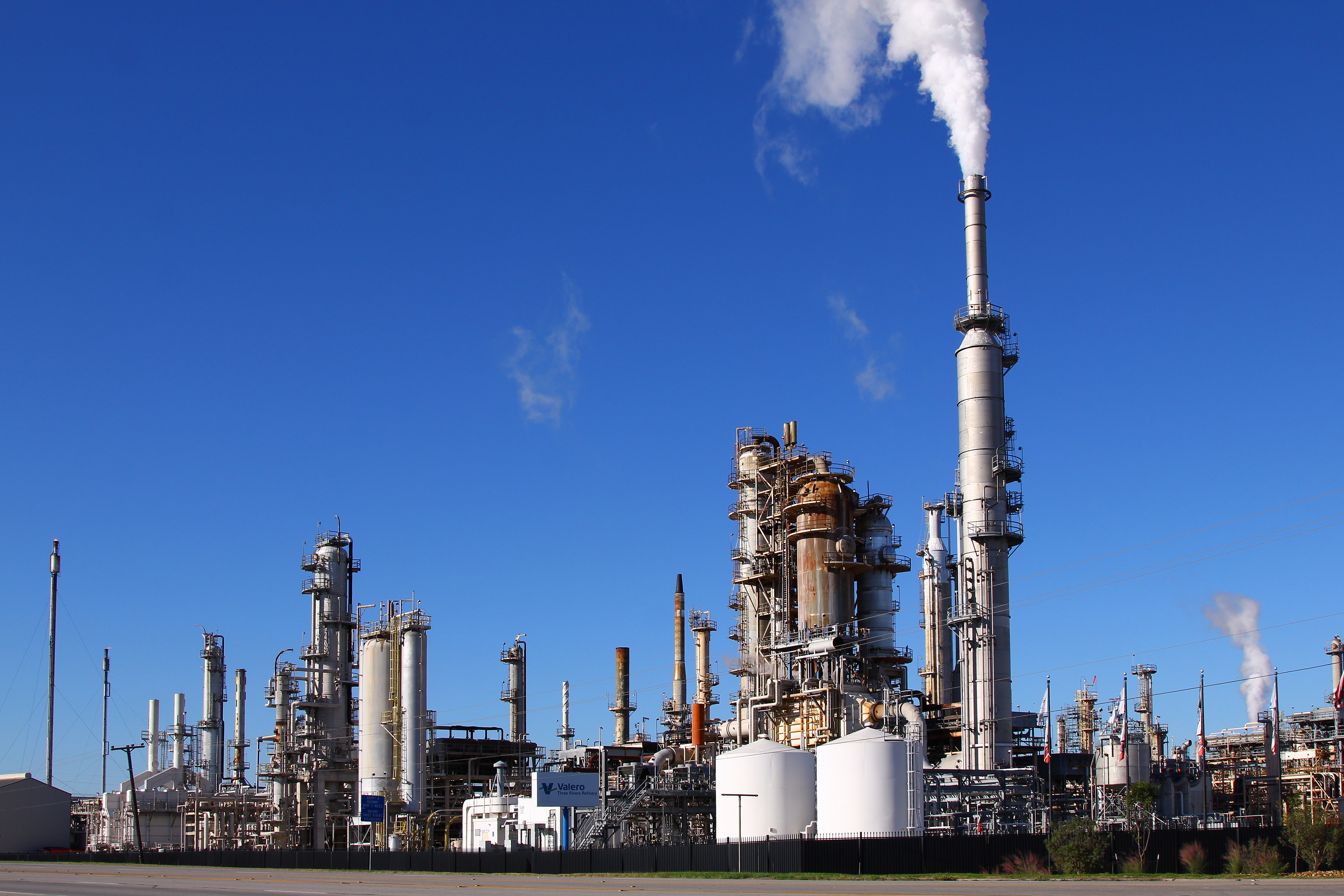
The Valero Refinery in Three Rivers, Texas

Texas was ranked second by GDP across the U.S. in 2020 and had a fast growing economy. According to U.S. Energy Information Administration, a large portion of Texas economic growth from 2005 to 2016 came from conventional energy production.

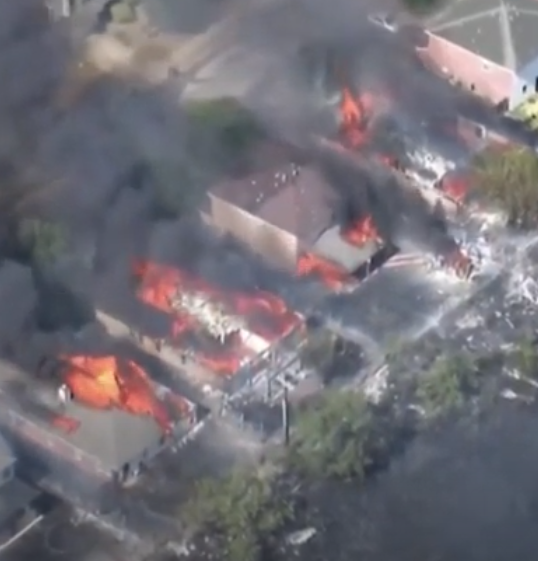
Houses destroyed by wildfire, Dallas, July 2022

Although Texas has a long history of conventional energy production (e.g., petroleum and natural gas), the renewable energy industry has also been rapidly growing in Texas. Solar industry jobs have been increasing and wind farms have been built in West Texas in recent years. Considering the advantages such as sunny weather, flat land and friendly business climate, Texas has high potential to develop more renewable energy in the future. In addition, there are emerging local and regional actions to address climate change across Texas. For example, Austin, Houston, Dallas, and San Antonio initiated Climate Action Plans in recent years. The government agencies also implemented programs such as Texas Emissions Reduction Plan and Innovative Energy Demonstration Program to promote the use of renewable energy and climate education in Texas.
