= Index of Texas-related articles =

The location of the state of Texas in the United States of America

The following is an alphabetical list of articles related to the U.S. state of Texas.

== 0–9 ==
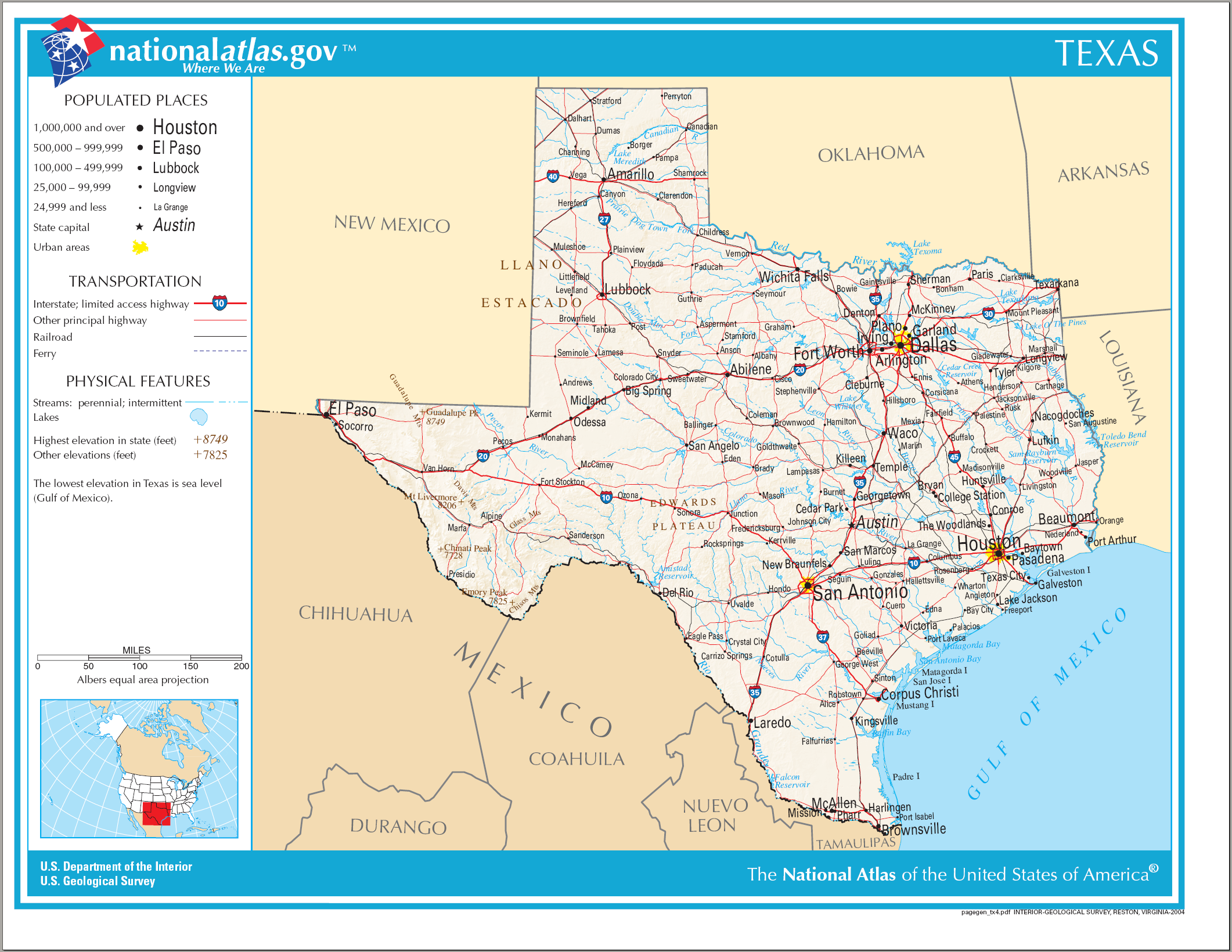
An enlargeable map of the state of Texas

- .tx.us – Internet second-level domain for the state of Texas
- 7-Eleven

== A ==
- Abortion in Texas
- Abilene, Texas
- Adams-Onís Treaty of 1819
- Adjacent states: (one of three states with eight neighbors)
  - State of Arkansas
  - Estado Libre y Soberano de Chihuahua
  - Estado Libre y Soberano de Coahuila de Zaragoza
  - State of Louisiana
  - State of New Mexico
  - Estado Libre y Soberano de Nuevo León
  - State of Oklahoma
  - Estado Libre y Soberano de Tamaulipas
- Adolphus Hotel
- ADV Films
- Agriculture in Texas
- Alamo
- Alamo Village
- Allen, TX
- Alley Theatre
- Álvar Núñez Cabeza de Vaca
- Amarillo Dillas
- Amarillo Gorillas
- Amarillo, Texas
- American Airlines
- American Airlines Center
- Ameriquest Field in Arlington
- Amusement parks in Texas
- Anahuac Disturbances
- Anahuac, Texas
- Anthony, Texas
- Angleton, Doris
- Angleton, Robert
- Angleton, Roger
- Aquaria in Texas
  - commons:Category:Aquaria in Texas
- Aransas Bay
- Aransas Pass
- Arboreta in Texas
  - commons:Category:Arboreta in Texas
- Archaeology of Texas
  - Category:Archaeological sites in Texas
    - commons:Category:Archaeological sites in Texas
- Architecture of Texas
- Area codes in Texas
- Ark-La-Tex
- Arlen, Texas
- Arlington Stadium
- Arlington, Texas
- Armadillo
- Armadillo World Headquarters
- ArtCar Museum
- Art museums and galleries in Texas
  - commons:Category:Art museums and galleries in Texas
- Astronomical observatories in Texas
  - commons:Category:Astronomical observatories in Texas
- Austin, Texas
- Austin-Bergstrom International Airport
- Austin City Limits (television)
- Austin Ice Bats
- Austin, Stephen F.
- Austin Wranglers

== B ==
- Balcones Fault
- Bank of America (Austin)
- Bank of America Center, Houston
- Bank of America Plaza (Dallas)
- Bank One Center (Houston)
- Baptist General Convention of Texas
- Bartlett, Steve
- Barton Springs
- Barton Springs Salamander
- Battle of the Alamo
- Battle of Gonzales
- Battle of San Jacinto
- Battle of Velasco
- Bauer College of Business
- Bay Ridge Christian College
- Baylor College of Medicine
- Baylor University
- Baytown, Texas
- Beaches of Texas
  - commons:Category:Beaches of Texas
- Beaumont, Texas
- Bentsen, Lloyd
- Bevo (mascot)
- Bible Belt
- Big Bend National Park
- Big Tex
- Bill Dauterive
- Black Belt in the American South
- Blaffer Gallery
- Blockbuster Video
- Blue Bell Creameries
- Bluebonnet
- Blue Line (DART)
- Bobby Hill (King of the Hill)
- Bonnell, Joseph
- Bonnie and Clyde
- Boomhauer
- Botanical gardens in Texas
  - commons:Category:Botanical gardens in Texas
- Bowie, Jim
- Bradley, Rebecca (the Flapper Bandit)
- Brazoria, Texas
- Brazos River
- Briscoe, Dolph
- Brown, Lee P.
- Brownsville, Texas
- Bryan, Texas
- Buchanan Dam
- Buildings and structures in Texas
  - commons:Category:Buildings and structures in Texas
- Burleson, Edward
- BNSF Railway
- Burnet, David G.
- Bush, George H. W.
- Bush, George W.

== C ==
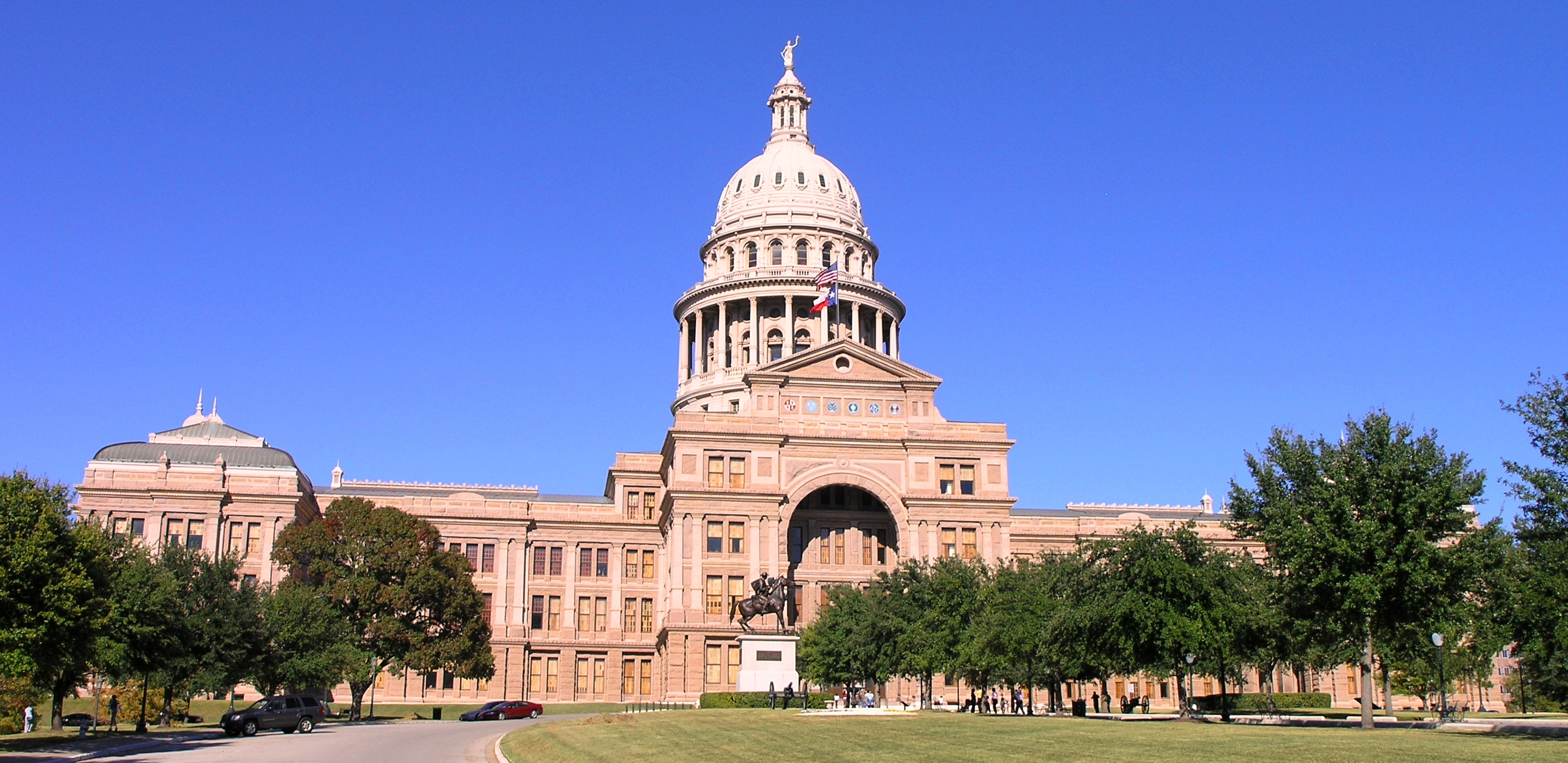
The Texas State Capitol in Austin

- Cabeza de Vaca, Álvar Núñez
- Caddo Lake
- Cadillac Ranch
- Cao, Anh "Joseph"
- Canyons and gorges of Texas
  - commons:Category:Canyons and gorges of Texas
- Capital of the State of Texas
- Capitol of the State of Texas
  - commons:Category:Texas State Capitol
- Carrollton, Texas
- Catholic bishops of Texas
- Caves of Texas
  - commons:Category:Caves of Texas
- Central Texas tornado outbreak
- Chinatown, Houston
- Chuck Norris
- Church of the SubGenius
- Clark, Edward
- Clemens, Roger
- Clements, Bill
- Climate of Texas
  - Category:Climate of Texas
    - commons:Category:Climate of Texas
- College Station, Texas
- Colorado River of Texas
- Columbia, Republic of Texas, republican capital 1836-1837
- Communications in Texas
  - commons:Category:Communications in Texas
- Compaq Center (Houston)
- CompUSA
- Connally, John
- ConocoPhillips
- Conroe, Texas
- Continental Airlines

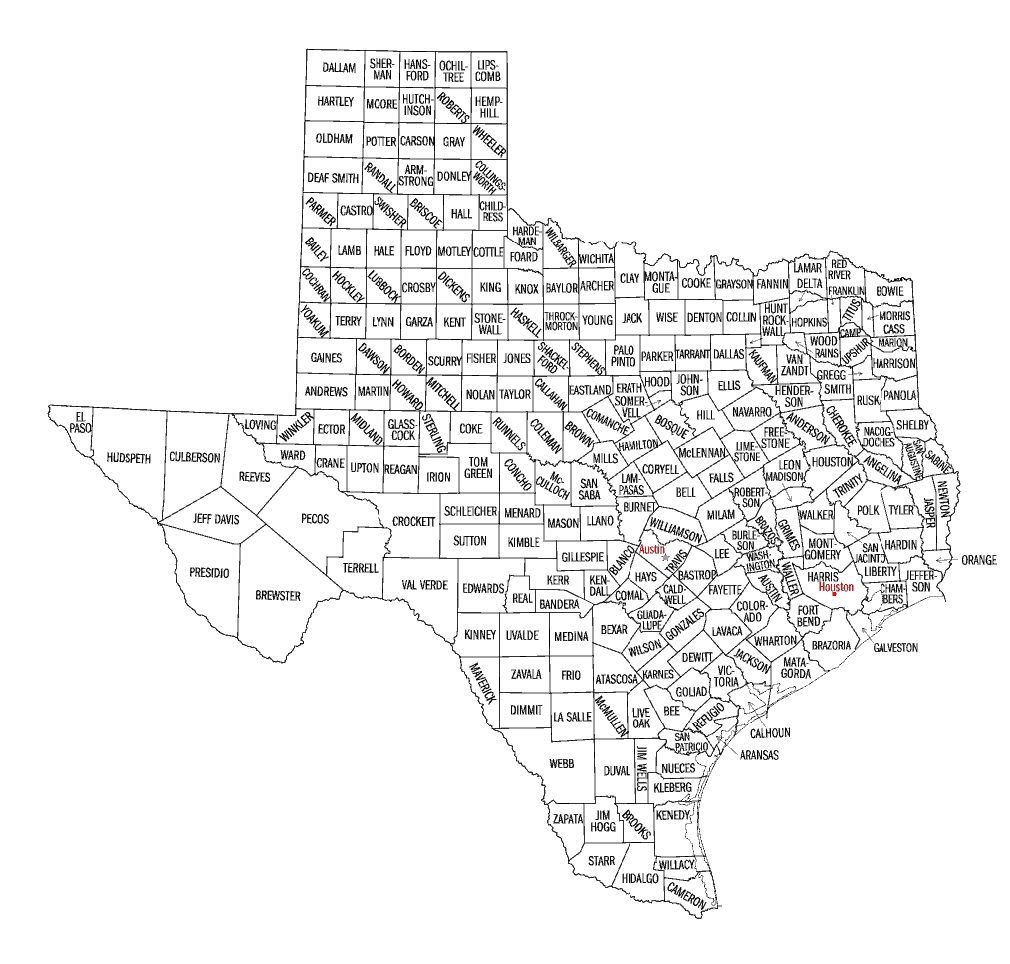
An enlargeable map of the 254 counties of the State of Texas

- Convention centers in Texas
  - commons:Category:Convention centers in Texas
- Convention of 1836
- Cornyn, John
- Corpus Christi International Airport
- Corpus Christi, Texas
- Cotton Hill
- Counties of Texas
- Cowboy
- Craft, Juanita
- Crockett, Davy
- Cruz, Ted
- Cuban, Mark
- Cuisine of Texas
- Culture of Texas
  - Category:Culture of Texas
    - commons:Category:Texas culture

== D ==
- Daikin Park
- The Daily Cougar
- Dale Gribble
- Dallas Area Rapid Transit
- Dallas Cowboys
- Dallas Desperados
- Dallas/Fort Worth International Airport
- Dallas/Fort Worth Metroplex
- Dallas Love Field
- Dallas Mavericks
- The Dallas Morning News
- Dallas Observer
- Dallas Stars
- Dallas
- Dallas, Texas
- The Dateline Downtown
- Dealey Plaza
- Debbie Does Dallas
- Deep Ellum
- Dell Computer
- Demographics of Texas
  - Category:Demographics of Texas
- Demographics of Dallas-Fort Worth
- Demographics of Houston
- Dell, Michael
- Denison, Texas
- Denton, Texas
- Dixie Chicks
- Dobie, J. Frank
- Don't Mess with Texas
- Downtown Houston
- Dr Pepper

== E ==
- Eagle Pass, Texas
- East Texas
- East Texas Baptist University
- East Texas Musical Convention
- Echo Hill Ranch
- Economy of Texas
  - Category:Economy of Texas
    - commons:Category:Economy of Texas
- Edinburg Roadrunners
- Edinburg, Texas
- Education in Texas
  - Category:Education in Texas
    - commons:Category:Education in Texas
- Edwards Plateau
- Elections in the State of Texas
  - Category:Elections in Texas
    - commons:Category:Elections in Texas
- Electronic Data Systems
- Ellington Field
- El Paso International Airport
- El Paso, Texas
- Enchanted Rock
- Enron
- Environment of Texas
  - commons:Category:Environment of Texas
- Estuaries of Texas
- Excel Communications
- Extreme points of Texas
- ExxonMobil

== F ==
The flag of the State of Texas

- Fair Park
- Faulk, John Henry
- F.C. Dallas
- Festivals in Texas
  - commons:Category:Festivals in Texas
- Flag of the State of Texas
- The Flame
- Flyleaf
- Fort Parker Massacre
- Fort Worth Cats
- Fort Worth Dallas Birthing Project
- Fort Worth, Texas
- Forts in Texas
  - Fort Bliss
  - Category:Forts in Texas
    - commons:Category:Forts in Texas
- Fountain Place
- Francisco Vásquez de Coronado
- Franklin Mountains
- Fredericksburg, Texas
- Friedman, Kinky
- Frisco RoughRiders
- Frisco, Texas
- Frontier Fiesta
- Frito Lay
- FUNimation

== G ==
- Galveston, Texas, republican capital 1836
- Galveston County, Texas
- Galveston County Bar Association
- Galveston Hurricane of 1900
- Gambling in Texas
- Gardens in Texas
  - commons:Category:Gardens in Texas
- Garland, Texas
- Geography of Texas
  - Category:Geography of Texas
    - commons:Category:Geography of Texas
- Geology of Texas
  - Category:Geology of Texas
    - commons:Category:Geology of Texas
- Geology of Wichita Falls, Texas
- George Bush Intercontinental Airport
- Ghost towns in Texas
  - Category:Ghost towns in Texas
    - commons:Category:Ghost towns in Texas
- Gilmore, Jimmie Dale
- Golf clubs and courses in Texas
- Goodnight, Charles
- Goodnight-Loving Trail
- Government of the State of Texas website
  - Category:Government of Texas
    - commons:Category:Government of Texas
- Governor of the State of Texas
  - List of governors of Texas
- Grace Point Church
- Gramm, Phil
- Grand Prairie, Texas
- Guadalupe River (Texas)

== H ==
- Hagerman, Amber
- Hall of State
- Halliburton
- Hank Hill
- Harlingen, Texas
- Harrisburgh, Republic of Texas, republican capital 1836
- Hawkins, Aubrey
- Heritage railroads in Texas
  - commons:Category:Heritage railroads in Texas
- Hicks, Tom
- Highway system of Texas
- Hilton College of Hotel and Restaurant Management
- Hilton University of Houston
- Hiking trails in Texas
  - commons:Category:Hiking trails in Texas
- Hines College of Architecture
- Hightower, Jim
- Hippie Hollow Park
- Hispanics and Latinos in Texas
- History of African Americans in Dallas-Ft. Worth
- History of African Americans in Houston
- History of African Americans in San Antonio
- History of African Americans in Texas
- History of Houston
- History of Mexican-Americans in Texas
- History of Mexican Americans in Dallas-Fort Worth
- History of Mexican Americans in Houston

History of Sugar Land, Texas

- History of Texas
  - Historical outline of Texas
    - Category:History of Texas
      - commons:Category:History of Texas
- Hockaday School, The
- Holly, Buddy
- Holy Land Foundation for Relief and Development
- Hotter'N Hell Hundred
- Houston Aeros (1994–2013)
- Houston Aeros (WHA)
- Houston Astros
- Houston Chronicle
- Houston Comets
- Houston Galleria
- Houston Independent School District
- Houston Livestock Show and Rodeo
- Houston Museum District
- Houston Rockets
- Houston, Sam
- Houston–Sugar Land–Baytown Metropolitan Area (Greater Houston)
- Houston Texans
- Houston, Texas, republican capital 1837-1839
- Houston Zoo
- Hurricane Alicia
- Husband, Rick
- Hutchison, Kay Bailey

== I ==
- id Software
- Images of Texas
  - commons:Category:Texas
- Inks Dam
- Inks Lake
- Institute for Christian Studies
- Interstate highway routes in Texas
- Ireland, John
- Irving, Texas
- Islands of Texas

== J ==
- JCPenney
- John Connally Unit
- John F. Kennedy assassination
- John Redcorn
- John Sealy Hospital
- Johnson, Lady Bird
- Johnson, Lyndon Baines
- Johnston, Albert Sidney
- Jones, Anson
- Jones, Jerry
- Joplin, Janis
- Jordan, Barbara
- Joseph Gribble
- JPMorgan Chase Tower - Dallas
- JPMorgan Chase Tower - Houston

== K ==
- Katy, Texas
- Kettle Restaurants
- Killeen, Texas
- Kimberly-Clark
- King of the Hill
- King Ranch
- Kirk, Ron
- Knowles, Beyoncé
- Koresh, David
- KTRK-TV

== L ==
- Laguna Atascosa National Wildlife Refuge
- Lake Marble Falls
- Lakes in Texas
  - Lady Bird Lake
  - Lake Austin
  - Lake Buchanan
  - Lake LBJ
  - Lake Travis
  - Category:Lakes of Texas
    - commons:Category:Lakes of Texas
- Lamar, Mirabeau B.
- Landmarks in Texas
  - commons:Category:Landmarks in Texas
- Landry, Tom
- Lane, Walter P.
- Laredo International Airport
- Laredo, Texas
- Las Colinas
- Lee College
- Legal status of Texas
- Leland, Mickey
- LeTourneau University
- Lipan Apache language
- Lipan Apache people
- Lists related to the State of Texas:
  - List of airports in Texas
  - List of book publishing houses in Texas
  - List of census statistical areas in Texas
  - List of cities in Texas
  - List of colleges and universities in Texas
  - List of companies in Texas
  - List of counties in Texas
  - List of county name etymologies in Texas
  - List of county seat name etymologies in Texas
  - List of farm to market roads in Texas
  - List of forts in Texas
  - List of freeways in the Dallas-Fort Worth area
  - List of ghost towns in Texas
  - List of governors of Texas
  - List of high schools in Texas
  - List of highways in the Houston area
  - List of highways in the San Antonio area
  - List of hospitals in Texas
  - List of individuals executed in Texas
  - List of Interstate highway routes in Texas
  - List of islands of Texas
  - List of lakes in Texas
  - List of law enforcement agencies in Texas
  - List of mayors of Austin, Texas
  - List of mayors of Dallas, Texas
  - List of mayors of El Paso, Texas
  - List of mayors of Fort Worth, Texas
  - List of mayors of Houston, Texas
  - List of mayors of Plano, Texas
  - List of mayors of San Antonio, Texas
  - List of museums in Texas
  - List of National Historic Landmarks in Texas
  - List of newspapers in Texas
  - List of people from Texas
  - List of radio stations in Texas
  - List of railroads in Texas
  - List of Registered Historic Places in Texas
  - List of rivers of Texas
  - List of school districts in Texas
  - List of state forests in Texas
  - List of state highway loops in Texas
  - List of state highway spurs in Texas
  - List of state highways in Texas
  - List of state parks in Texas
  - List of state prisons in Texas
  - List of symbols of the State of Texas
  - List of telephone area codes in Texas
  - List of television stations in Texas
  - List of Texas's congressional delegations
  - List of United States congressional districts in Texas
  - List of United States representatives from Texas
  - List of United States senators from Texas
  - List of U.S. highway routes in Texas
- Literature of Texas
- Llano Estacado
- Llano River
- Llano Uplift
- Longhorn Dam
- Longview, Texas
- Louisiana Purchase of 1803
- Love Field
- Lower Colorado River Authority
- Luanne Platter
- Lubbock, Francis
- Lubbock International Airport
- Lubbock, Texas
- Lyndon B. Johnson Space Center

== M ==
- Machemehl, Charles W.
- Machemehl, Chuck
- Machemehl, Louis A.
- Machemehl, Paul
- McAllen, Texas
- McAllen-Miller International Airport
- McClure, Jessica
- Magnolia Hotel (Dallas, Texas)
- Magnolia Hotel (Houston)
- Mansfield Dam
- Mass shootings in Texas
- Maps of Texas
  - commons:Category:Maps of Texas
- Marshall, Texas
- Mesquite Championship Rodeo
- Mesquite, Texas
- Metropolitan Transit Authority of Harris County, Texas
- METRORail
- Mexican Texas
- Michelson Museum of Art
- Midland, Texas
- Miller, Laura
- Missing in Brooks County
- Mission, Texas
- Monuments and memorials in Texas
  - commons:Category:Monuments and memorials in Texas
- Moody Gardens
- Moores School of Music
- Mountains of Texas
  - commons:Category:Mountains of Texas
- Mount Bonnell
- Murrah, Pendleton
- Museums in Texas
  - Category:Museums in Texas
    - commons:Category:Museums in Texas
- Music of Texas
  - Category:Music of Texas
    - commons:Category:Music of Texas
  - Category:Musical groups from Texas
  - Category:Musicians from Texas
- Mustangs at Las Colinas

== N ==
- Nancy Gribble
- National forests of Texas
  - commons:Category:National Forests of Texas
- Natural history of Texas
  - commons:Category:Natural history of Texas
- Nature centers in Texas
  - commons:Category:Nature centers in Texas
- Neiman Marcus
- New Braunfels, Texas

== O ==
- Odessa, Texas
- Option fee (Texas)
- Orange, Texas
- Orbison, Roy
- Outdoor sculptures in Texas
  - commons:Category:Outdoor sculptures in Texas

== P ==
- Palo Duro Canyon
- Parker, Cynthia Ann
- Parker, Daniel
- Parker, Quanah
- Pasadena, Texas
- Pecos River
- Pedernales River
- Peggy Hill
- People from Texas
  - Category:People from Texas
    - commons:Category:People from Texas
    - Category:People from Texas by populated place
    - Category:People from Texas by county
    - Category:People from Texas by occupation
- Perry, Rick
- Plano, Texas
- Poe, Ted
- Politics of Texas
  - Category:Politics of Texas
    - commons:Category:Politics of Texas
- Port Arthur, Texas
- Protected areas of Texas
  - commons:Category:Protected areas of Texas

== Q ==
- Quinn, Paul

== R ==
- Radio Shack
- Railroad museums in Texas
  - commons:Category:Railroad museums in Texas
- Red Line (DART)
- Red River of the South
- Registered Historic Places in Texas
- Redneck
- Reliant Astrodome
- Reliant Energy
- Reliant Park
- Reliant Stadium
- Religion in Texas
  - Category:Religion in Texas
    - commons:Category:Religion in Texas
- Renaissance Tower (Dallas)
- Republic of Texas
- Republic of Texas (group)
- Resendiz, Angel Maturino
- Reunion Arena
- Rice University
- Rice, William Marsh
- Richards, Ann
- Richardson, Texas
- Rick Husband Amarillo International Airport
- Rio Grande
- Rio Grande Valley
- Rio Grande Valley White Wings
- Rivas, George
- Rock formations in Texas
  - commons:Category:Rock formations in Texas
- Roller coasters in Texas
  - commons:Category:Roller coasters in Texas
- Round Rock Express
- Ryan, Nolan

== S ==
- Sabine River
- St. Edward's University
- Saint Mary's University of San Antonio
- San Angelo Colts
- San Angelo, Texas
- San Antonio Bay
- San Antonio de Béxar, colonial capital 1772-1824
- San Antonio Area Foundation
- San Antonio International Airport
- San Antonio Silver Stars
- San Antonio Spurs
- San Antonio, Texas
- San Benito, Texas
- San Jacinto College
- San José Island (Texas)
- San Marcos, Texas
- Santa Ana National Wildlife Refuge
- Schlitterbahn
- Seal of the State of Texas
- Seguin, Texas
- Selena
  - Selena, Death of
- Service Corporation International
- Settlements in Texas
  - Cities in Texas
  - Towns in Texas
  - Villages in Texas
  - Census Designated Places in Texas
  - Other unincorporated communities in Texas
  - List of ghost towns in Texas
- Sharpstown scandal
- Sherman, Texas
- Shasta
- Shiner beer
- Sid Richardson College
- Six Flags
- Six Flags Astroworld
- Smith, Preston
- South by Southwest Festival
- Southeast Texas Regional Airport
- Southern Methodist University
- South Padre Island, Texas
- South Park Mexican
- Southwest Airlines
- Southwest Conference
- Spindletop
- Sports in Texas
  - Category:Sports in Texas
    - commons:Category:Sports in Texas
  - Category:Sports venues in Texas
    - commons:Category:Sports venues in Texas
- Max Starcke Dam
- State Fair
- State Fair of Texas
- State of Texas website
  - Government of the State of Texas
    - Category:Government of Texas
      - commons:Category:Government of Texas
- Strauss, Annette
- Structures in Texas
  - commons:Category:Buildings and structures in Texas
- Sugar Land Regional Airport
- Sugar Land, Texas
- Superconducting Super Collider
- Superfund sites in Texas
- Symbols of the State of Texas
  - Category:Symbols of Texas
    - commons:Category:Symbols of Texas

the

== T ==
- Tandy Center Subway
- Tejanos
- Telecommunications in Texas
  - commons:Category:Communications in Texas
- Telephone area codes in Texas
- Temple, Texas
- Texans for Fiscal Accountability
- Texans for Vaccine Choice
- Texarkana, Texas
- Texas website
  - Category:Texas
    - commons:Category:Texas
      - commons:Category:Maps of Texas
- Texas 7
- Texas A&M University
- Texas A&M University at Galveston
- Texas A&M University–Victoria
- Texas Annexation
- Texas Asia Society
- Texas Association of Licensed Investigators
- Texas Border Coalition
- Texas Bureau of Child and Animal Protection
- Texas Cart War
- Texas Centennial Exposition
- Texas Christian University
- Texas City Disaster
- Texas City, Texas
- Texas Co-op Power magazine
- Texas Civil Service Testing
- Texas County & District Retirement System
- Texas Declaration of Independence
- Texas Fair Trade Coalition
- Texas Fund Trapping Notice
- Texas Gas Service
- Texas Health and Science University
- Texas Highland Lakes
- Texas Highway Patrol Association
- Texas Hill Country
- Texas Historical Commission
- Texas in the American Civil War
- Texas Instruments
- Texas Junior Golf Tour
- Texas Legation
- Texas Legislature
- Texas literature
- Texas Longhorn (cattle)
- Texas Longhorn sports teams (The University of Texas)
- Texas Medical Center
- Texas Millionaires Chorus
- Texas Mini GP Series
- Texas Municipal Retirement System
- Texas Night Train
- Texas Our Texas
- Texas Panhandle
- Texas Parks and Wildlife Department
- Texas Policy Evaluation Project
- Texas Psychological Association
- Texas Rangers (baseball)
- Texas Ranger Division (the "Texas Rangers")
- Texas Revolution
- Texas Soaring Association
- Texas Southern University
- Texas State Capitol
- Texas State Guard
- Texas State Guard Commanding General's Individual Award
- Texas State University
- Texas Statutes
- Texas Tech University
- Texas Woman's University
- Tex-Mex cuisine
- Thanks-Giving Square
- Theatres in Texas
  - commons:Category:Theatres in Texas
- Timeline of the Texas Revolution
- Toll bridges, tunnels, and ferries in Texas
- Tom Miller Dam
- Tonkawa
- Tourism in Texas website
  - commons:Category:Tourism in Texas
- Toyota Center (Houston)
- Transportation in Texas
  - Category:Transportation in Texas
    - commons:Category:Transport in Texas
- Travis, William B.
- Treaty Oak (Austin, Texas)
- Treaty of Guadalupe Hidalgo of 1848
- Trinity Metro
- Trinity Railway Express
- Trinity River
- Tropical Storm Allison
- Turtle Bayou Resolutions
- TX – United States Postal Service postal code for the State of Texas
- Tyler, Texas

== U ==
- United States of America
  - States of the United States of America
  - United States census statistical areas of Texas
  - Texas's congressional delegations
  - United States congressional districts in Texas
  - United States Court of Appeals for the Fifth Circuit
  - United States District Court for the Eastern District of Texas
  - United States District Court for the Northern District of Texas
  - United States District Court for the Southern District of Texas
  - United States District Court for the Western District of Texas
  - United States representatives from Texas
  - United States senators from Texas
- University of Houston
- University of Houston–Clear Lake
- University of Houston–Downtown
- University of Houston Law Center
- University of Houston System
- University of North Texas
- University of Texas at Austin
- University of Texas at El Paso
- University of Texas Medical Branch at Galveston
- University of Texas at San Antonio
- University of Texas System
- Unpuncliegut
- Uptown Houston
- U.S. highway routes in Texas
- US-TX – ISO 3166-2:US region code for the State of Texas
- USS Texas

== V ==
- Van Zandt, Isaac
- Vaughan, Stevie Ray
- Velasco, Republic of Texas, republican capital 1836
- Victoria, Texas

== W ==
- Waco, Texas
- Walker, Texas Ranger
- Waller, Edwin
- Walnut Springs Park
- Washington, Republic of Texas, republican capital 1836
- Water parks in Texas
- Waterfalls of Texas
  - commons:Category:Waterfalls of Texas
- Wells Fargo Plaza (El Paso)
- Wells Fargo Plaza (Houston)
- West Texas
- West Texas A&M University
- Whataburger
- Wheatley Place
- White, D. P.
- White, Mark
- Whitman, Charles
- Wichita Falls, Texas
  Wikimedia
  - Wikimedia Commons:Category:Texas
    - commons:Category:Maps of Texas
  - Wikinews:Category:Texas
    - Wikinews:Portal:Texas
  - Wikipedia Category:Texas
    - Wikipedia Portal:Texas
    - Wikipedia:WikiProject Texas
      - Category:WikiProject Texas articles
      - Wikipedia:WikiProject Texas#Participants
- Wiley University
- William P. Hobby Airport
- Williams Tower
- Wind power in Texas
- Wines of Texas
- Wirtz Dam
- Women's Shelter of South Texas

== X ==
- XIT Ranch

== Y ==
- Yates, Andrea Pia

== Z ==
- Zellweger, Renée
- Zoos in Texas
  - commons:Category:Zoos in Texas
- ZZ Top

== See also ==
- Topic overview:
  - Texas
  - Outline of Texas
- Topic articles
