= Craig Rosengarden =

American golf publisher and radio host

- Citizenship: United States
- Education: Kellogg School of Management
- Occupations: Publisher; Radio host; Businessman
- Known for: Founder of AvidGolfer magazine
- Title: President, Avid Media
- Spouse: Amy Rice Rosengarden

Craig Rosengarden is an American golf publisher, radio host, and businessman based in Dallas, Texas. He is the founder and president of AvidGolfer magazine and the co-host of The Tee Box golf radio show on 1310 AM The Ticket. He also serves as president of Avid Media, the Texas Junior Golf Tour, and the Rocky Mountain Junior Golf Tour.

== Early life and education ==
Rosengarden was raised in the United States and received his first wristwatch as a bar mitzvah gift at the age of 13, an event he has credited with starting a lifelong interest in watch collecting. He later completed studies at the Kellogg School of Management at Northwestern University before entering the media industry.

== Career ==
After his graduation, Rosengarden worked in sales, including a position as sales manager at MAI Basic Four from 1988 to 1990 and as vice president of sales at the direct marketing firm Advo from 1990 to 1997.

In 1997, Rosengarden founded AvidGolfer, a regional golf magazine launched in the Dallas–Fort Worth metroplex that later expanded with editions covering Houston, Austin, San Antonio, and Colorado. During the early years, AvidGolfer organized the Media Madness Golf Challenge, a tournament featuring Dallas–Fort Worth media personalities that became an annual fixture and helped increase the readership of publication. Rosengarden serves as president of the magazine's parent company, Avid Media, which also produces consumer expos and digital golf content.

In 2004, Rosengarden began co-hosting The Teebox, a weekend golf radio program on Dallas sports station 1310 AM The Ticket, with Rick Arnett. The show is broadcast on Saturday mornings and covers tournament leaderboards, equipment reviews, course profiles, and interviews with golf industry figures.

In 2010, Rosengarden launched IdealGolfer.Com, a daily deal website offering discounted tee times, equipment, and golf-travel packages. D Magazine described it as a "Groupon for golfers."

Rosengarden has been president of the Texas Junior Golf Tour, an amateur tour for school-age golfers, since 2016, and also leads the affiliated Rocky Mountain Junior Golf Tour. In 2023, he founded the AG Dallas Golf Expo, a consumer golf trade show held in the Dallas–Fort Worth metroplex.

== Personal life ==
Rosengarden is an avid watch collector and has collected a variety of watches, including models from Ulysse Nardin, Franck Muller, and Glashutte. He is married and has a son.
