= GP series =

GP Series may refer to:

- Geometric progression, a mathematical series
- G.P., an Australian medical TV series
- Texas Mini GP Series, an organization hosting motorcycle road races
