= BIPP =

BIPP may refer to:

- Barisan Islam Pembebasan Patani
- Batterers Intervention and Prevention Program: see Women's Shelter of South Texas
- "Bipp", a song by Sophie
- Bismuth subnitrate iodoform paraffin paste: see Iodoform
- British Institute of Professional Photography
