= Angleton =

Angleton may refer to:

== Angleton family ==
- Doris Angleton (1951–1997), American socialite and murder victim from Texas
- Robert Angleton (b. 1948), American bookmaker; exonerated of the murder of his wife
- Roger Angleton (1942–1998), American murderer

== Other uses ==
- Angleton, Texas, U.S.
  - Angleton High School
- James Jesus Angleton (1917–1987), American CIA official
- Angleton Iron Works, a scheduled monument in Coity Higher, Bridgend County Borough, Wales
