= List of book publishing houses in Texas =

This is a list of book publishing houses in Texas.

== Texas publishing houses ==
- A Strange Object
- Abilene Christian University Press
- Abode Press
- Absolute Love Publishing
- Alabrava Press
- Alamo Bay Press
- Amaya Books
- Anaphora Literary Press
- Angelina River Press
- Anomalist Books
- Arte Público Press
- Atelier De Laredo
- Atmosphere Press
- Awst Press
- Aztlan Libre Press
- Baylor University Press
- Bayou City Press
- BenBella Books
- Beyond Borders Books
- Black Rose Writing
- Bloomsday Literary
- Blue Cubicle Press
- Blue Handle Publishing
- Brown Books Publishing
- Burlwood Books
- Canarium Books
- Cattywampus Press
- Cinco Puntos Press
- Chestnut Publishing House
- CT Publishing
- Clear Fork Publishing
- Clockwork Storybook
- Conocimientos Press
- Copano Bay Press
- Dark Horse Fiction
- Deep Vellum Publishing
- Defiance Press & Publishing
- Del Alma Publications
- Elm Grove Publishing
- El Zarape Press
- Falling Marbles Press
- Fawkes Press
- FlowerSong Press
- Fontaine House Publishing
- Ghoulish Books
- Girls With Pens Press
- Great Texas Line Press
- Greenleaf Book Group
- Henery Press
- Hierophant Publishing
- High Bridge Books
- Hill College Press
- Host Publications
- House of Stitched Publications
- Ink Brush Press
- Inklings Publishing
- JJ Galveston Books
- J-Novel Club
- Kallisto Gaia Press
- K.Co Press
- Lamar University Literary Press
- Lioncrest Publishing Agency
- little lamb books
- Leafwood Publishers
- LongTale Publishing
- Lucid Books
- Madville Publishing
- Material Media Press
- Mindworks Publishing
- MonkeyBrain Books
- Motina Books
- Mouthfeel Press
- Mutabilis Press
- Night Heron Media
- Octane Press
- Pandamoon Publishing
- Paper Airplane Publishing
- Pecan Grove Press
- Perpetual Motion Machine Publishing
- Plain View Press
- Progressive Rising Phoenix Press
- Quartermarch Press
- The Raving Press
- Rice University Press
- ROM Digital Ink Press
- Saint Julian Press
- Scurlock Publishing Company
- Shearer Publishing
- Skipjack Publishing
- Sleeping Panther Press
- Slough Press
- SlyGirl Publishing
- Smoking Glue Gun
- Somos en escrito Literary Foundation Press
- Southern Methodist University Press
- Spellbound Publishing House
- Spider Road Press
- Spiritscribe Publishing
- Stephen F. Austin State University Press
- Stoney Creek Publishing
- Surveyor Books
- Texas A&M University Press
- Texas Christian University Press
- Texas Review Press
- Texas Sisters Press
- Texas State Historical Association Press
- Texas Tech University Press
- Texas Western Press
- Torch Literary Arts
- Transcendent Zero Press
- Trinity University Press
- University of North Texas Press
- University of Texas Press
- Veliz Books
- Viper Comics
- Waldorf Press
- Weasel Press
- Weeva
- White Bird Publications
- Wild Horse Media Group
- Wild Lark Books Publishing
- Winedale Publishing

== See also ==
- List of English-language book publishing companies
