= Bureau of Child and Animal Protection =

The "State Bureau of Child and Animal Protection" was the name assigned to Child Protective Services in a number of states during the early 20th century. This was all part of "The Humane Movement" documented by the Descriptive Survey by the same name. The join of Child and Animal Protections was documented in the same survey showing Colorado as a champion of this philosophy

== State Bureaus ==
It is known that at least 3 states have used this name: Colorado, Montana and Texas.

=== Colorado ===
References to the statutes creating the Colorado Bureau of Child and Animal Protection can be found in "The Revised Statutes of Colorado, 1908"

=== Montana ===
The Montana Bureau of Child and Animal Protection is the best documented by far. Starting with the 1904 Report, followed by 5 biannual reports for the years: 1905-06, 1907-08, 1909-10, 1915-16 and 1922-1924.

=== Texas ===
The Texas Bureau of Child and Animal Protection was created by the Texas legislature in 1913.
