= Texas State Guard Good Conduct Medal =

Military award

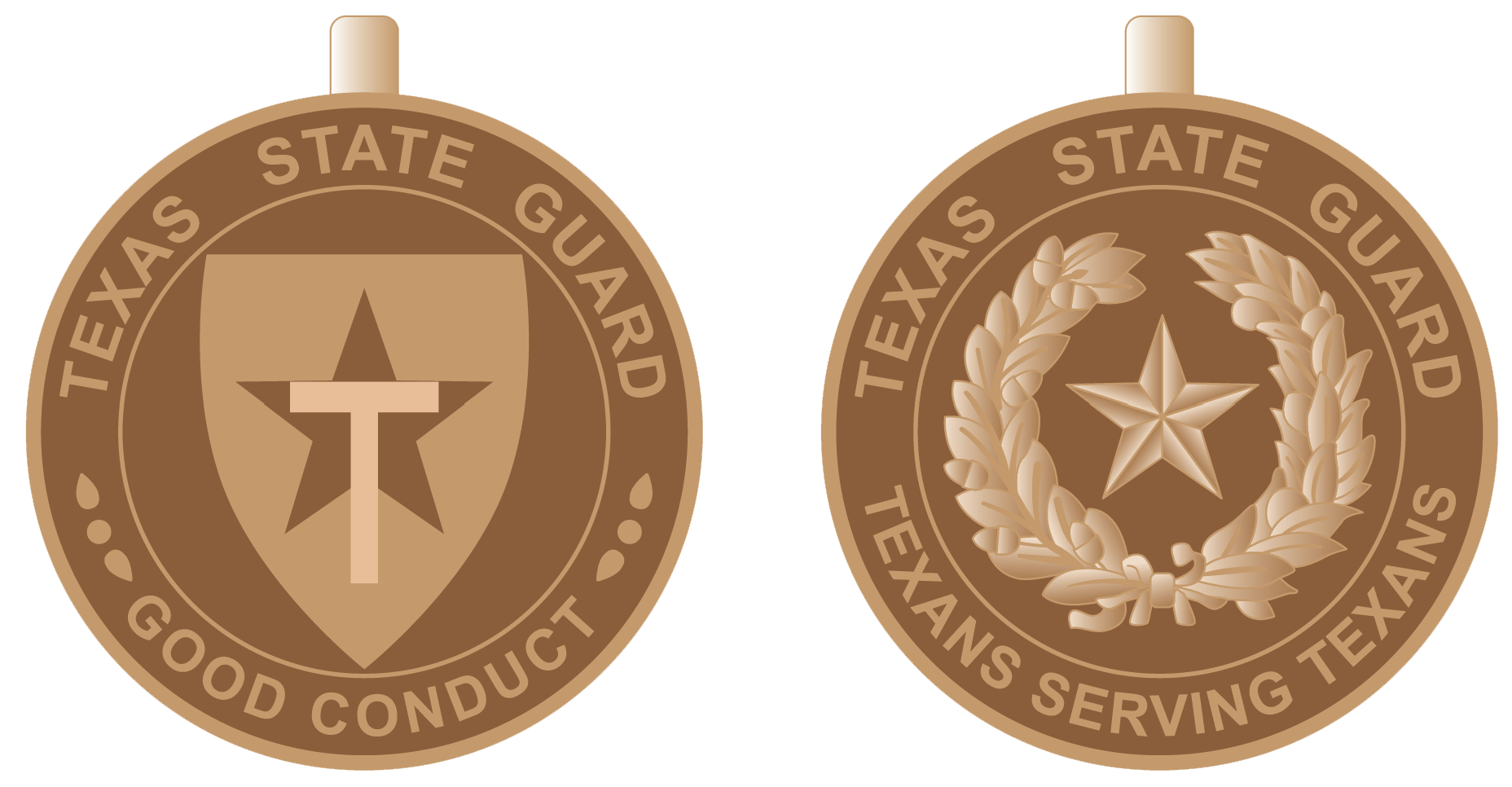
- Type: Military decoration
- Awarded for: Good Conduct
- Presented by: Texas State Guard
- Status: Currently issued
- Established: May 12, 2021
- Service Ribbon

Precedence
- Next (higher): Texas State Guard Commanding General's Individual Award
- Next (lower): Texas State Guard Recruiting Ribbon

The Texas State Guard Good Conduct Medal is the thirteenth highest military decoration that may be conferred to a service member of the Texas State Guard.

== Eligibility ==
All Texas State Guard service members receive this award after two consecutive years of honorable and faithful service. Disciplinary actions cancel out the service member's current two-year time frame, but previously awarded Texas State Guard Good Conduct Medals are not rescinded nor is the service member disqualified for future awards. The award is retroactive and applies to years of service prior to the creation of the award.

== Description ==
The medal pendant is of bronze, 1 1/4 inches in diameter. On the obverse side of the pendant is the centered seal of the Texas State Guard. The seal is a shield on which is a recessed five-pointed star, one point up, over which is the raised letter, "T.", encircled by the words, "TEXAS STATE GUARD" on the upper arc and "GOOD CONDUCT" along the lower arc. The words “GOOD CONDUCT” are bookended by a waterdrop with point facing upwards, atop a circle, atop a waterdrop with points towards the words “GOOD CONDUCT”. On the reverse side of the pendant is a five-pointed raised star, one point up, 3/8 of an inch in diameter surrounded by a wreath formed by an olive branch on the right and a live oak branch on the left, surrounded by the words "TEXAS STATE GUARD" along the upper arc and "TEXANS SERVING TEXANS" along the lower arc, in raised letters.

== Ribbon ==
The pendant is suspended by a ring from a rayon moiré ribbon 1 3/8 inches long and 1 3/8 inches and wide, composed of five vertical stripes. The first stripe is Goldenlite #67107 (1/4 of an inch), followed by Emerald #67128 (1/8 of an inch), Goldenlite (5/8 of an inch), Emerald (1/8 of an inch), and Goldenlite (1/4 of an inch).

== Devices ==
The second and subsequent awards are indicated by the wear of the clasp with loops on the ribbon. Bronze clasps indicate the second (two loops) through fifth award (five loops); Silver clasps indicate sixth (one loop) through tenth award (five loops); and Gold clasps indicate eleventh (one loop) through the fifteenth award (five loops)

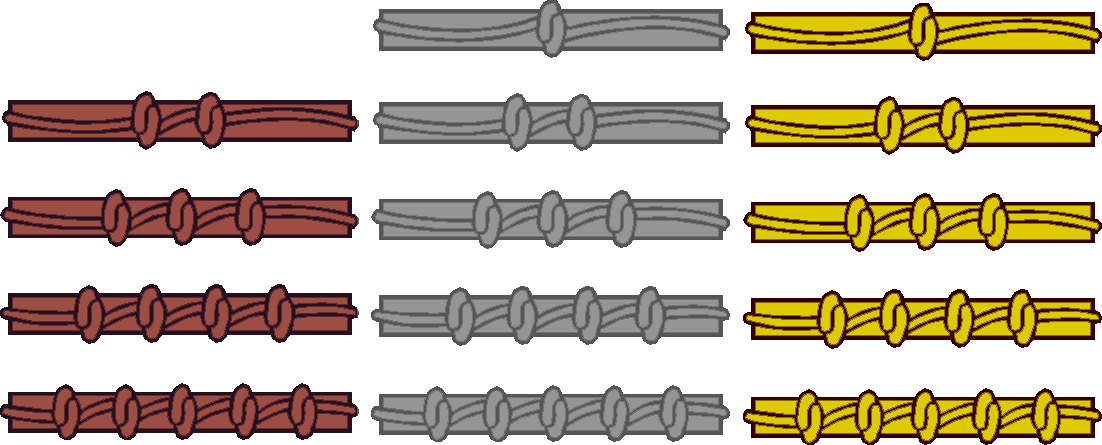

== See also ==
- Awards and decorations of the Texas Military
- Awards and decorations of the Texas government
- Texas Military Forces
- Texas Military Department
