= Texas state highway system =

Highway system of Texas in the United States

- Sample highway markers for Interstate Highways, U.S. Highways, State highways, and Farm To Market highways

System information
- Length: 72,978.175 mi (117,446.988 km)
- Notes: All classes of state-numbered highways are generally state-maintained.

Highway names
- Interstates: Interstate X (I-X); Interstate Highway X (IH X)
- US Highways: U.S. Highway X (US X)
- State: State Highway X (SH X)
- Loops: Loop X
- Spurs: Spur X
- Recreational: Recreational Road X (RE X)
- Farm or Ranch to Market Roads: Farm-to-Market Road X (FM X); Ranch-to-Market Road X (RM X)
- Park Roads: Park Road X (PR X)

System links
- Highways in Texas; Interstate; US; State; Former; Toll; Loops; Spurs; FM/RM; Park; Rec

Texas state highways are a network of highways owned and maintained by the U.S. state of Texas. The Texas Department of Transportation (TxDOT) is the state agency responsible for the day-to-day operations and maintenance of the system. Texas has the largest state highway system, followed closely by North Carolina's state highway system. In addition to the nationally numbered Interstate Highways and U.S. Highways, the highway system consists of a main network of state highways, loops, spurs, and beltways that provide local access to the other highways. The system also includes a large network of farm to market roads that connect rural areas of the state with urban areas and the rest of the state highway system. The state also owns and maintains some park and recreational roads located near and within state and national parks, as well as recreational areas. All state highways, regardless of classification, are paved roads. The Old San Antonio Road, also known as the El Camino Real, is the oldest highway in the United States, first being blazed in 1691. The length of the highways varies from US 83's 893.4 miles (1,437.8 km) inside the state borders to Spur 200 at just 0.05 miles (260 ft; 80 m) long.

== History ==
Shield used until the mid-1940s

The Texas State Highway System can trace its roots to the establishment of the Texas Highway Department on April 4, 1917. Administrative control of the department was given to a three-member commission appointed by the governor for two-year terms. On June 21, 1917, the commission conducted its first public hearing to solicit input on potential highway routes. The committee also divided the state into six divisions to be headquartered in Amarillo, Dallas, Fort Worth, Houston, San Angelo, and San Antonio. Later that year, the commission designated 26 state highways covering 8,865 miles (14,267 km) which were to be readily accessible to 89% of the state's population.

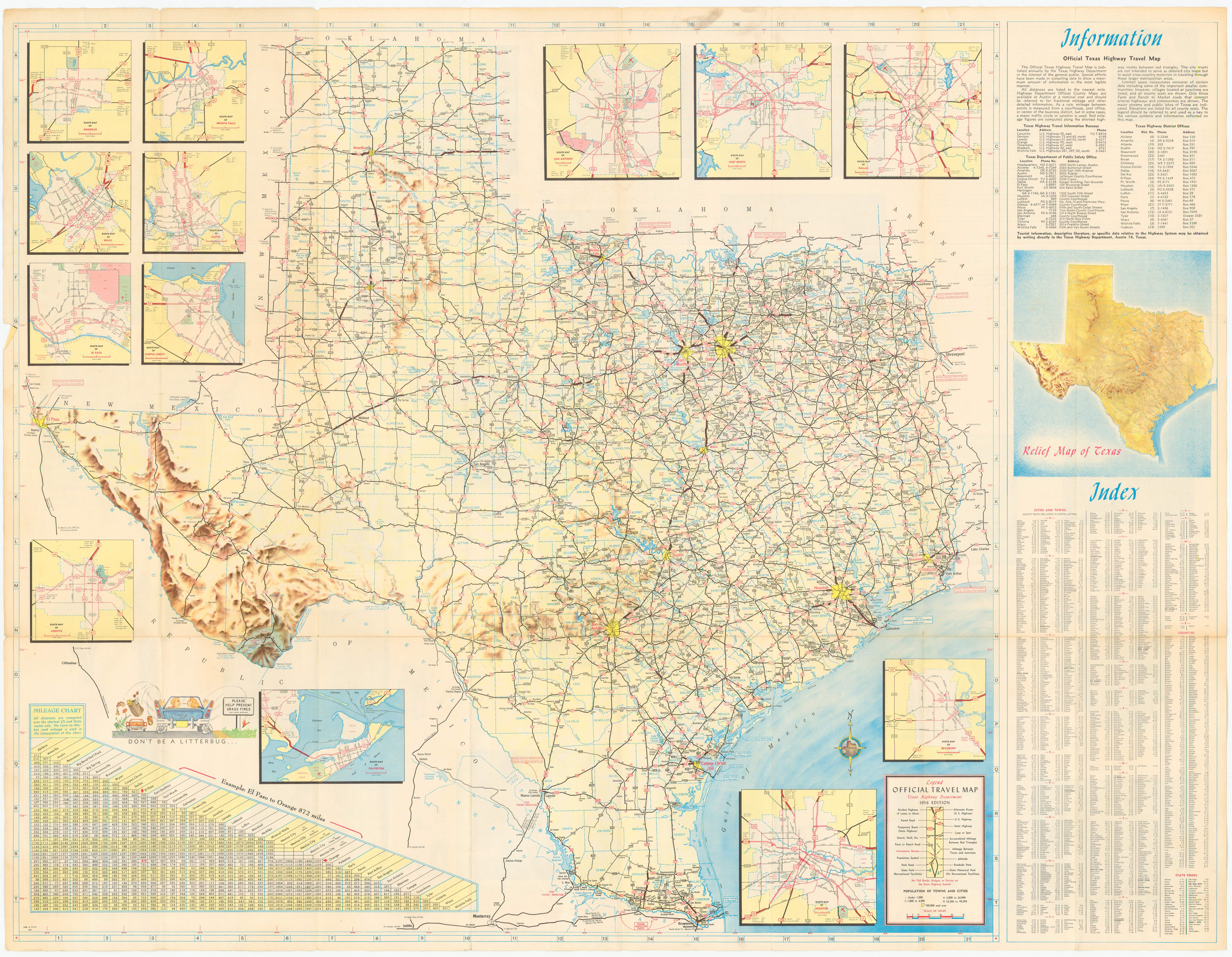
The state road system in 1956, the last year before construction on the Interstate Highway System began

In 1921, Congress amended the Federal Aid to Roads Act of 1916 to require the states to take control of road design, construction, and maintenance of state highways by 1925. As a result, on January 1, 1924, the Texas Highway Department took full control of maintaining the state highways from the counties within which they resided. In 1925, the state legislature granted the highway department the responsibility of surveying, planning, and building highways, and the authorization to acquire new highway rights-of-way by purchasing, or condemning through eminent domain, land required for highway construction.

By 1927, the highway system covered 17,960 miles (28,900 km), of which 96 miles (154 km) were concrete, 1,060 miles (1,710 km) were asphalt, 5,000 miles (8,000 km) were gravel, shell or stone, and 10,000 miles (20,000 km) were clay or soil.

In 1951, a 50-mile (80 km) section of the Gulf Freeway (now I-45) opened, becoming Texas' first urban freeway. In 1957, the state began receiving federal funding for the construction of the Interstate Highway System. The first section of Interstate Highway from county line to county line to open in the state was a 43-mile (69 km) section of I-35 in Bexar County. By 1967, the highway system controlled 66,000 miles (106,000 km) of highway.

In 1984, US 66 was replaced by I-40 and the US 66 designation was removed from the state highway system the following year.

In 1992, the 3,200 miles (5,100 km) of Interstate Highway System in Texas was completed with the opening of a six-mile (9.7 km) section of I-27. In 1997, the Texas Turnpike Authority was merged with TxDOT and independently, the North Texas Turnpike Authority became responsible for toll projects in Collin, Dallas, Denton, and Tarrant counties.

== Types of highways ==
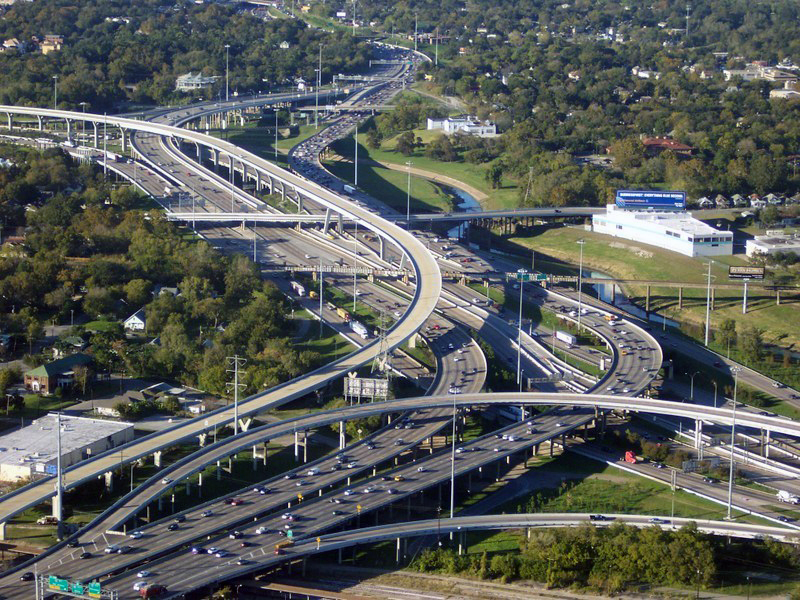
I-10 and I-45 interchange in Houston

=== Interstate Highways ===
A map of all Interstate Highways in Texas

The Interstate Highway System in Texas covers 3,233.4 miles (5,203.7 km) and consists of ten ten primary highways, seven auxiliary highways, and the splitting of both Interstate 35 (I-35) and Interstate 69 into multiple letter-suffixed branches. The Interstate Highway with the longest segment in Texas is I-10 at 880.6 miles (1,417.2 km). The shortest in the state is I-110 at 0.9 miles (1.4 km).

The construction of the Interstate Highway System in Texas actually began well before these routes were designated as Interstate Highways. A 50-mile (80 km) stretch of the Gulf Freeway (I-45) between Galveston and Houston was opened in 1951, eight years before it was designated I-45. It was also the first urban expressway in Texas. In 1962, 43 miles (69 km) of I-35 opened in Bexar County, the first section of Interstate Highway to open from county line to county line in a large metropolitan area. Portions of I-10 west of San Antonio took much longer to complete due to the vast open spaces and lack of nearby labor. The majority of the construction of this section of I-10 occurred in the 1970s and 1980s and was complete by the early 1990s. The section east of San Antonio was completed 20 years earlier in 1972. The opening of a 6-mile (10 km) section of I-27 in 1992 completed the Interstate Highway System in Texas.

Construction is ongoing for an extension of I-69 southward from its original terminus in Indiana through Texas to the Mexican border. When built, I-69 will extend about 650 miles (1,050 km) across Texas, from the Louisiana state line in the Texarkana–Shreveport area to South Texas. Similar to I-35, I-69 splits into three letter-suffixed branches, I-69E, I-69C, and I-69W.

=== U.S. Highways ===
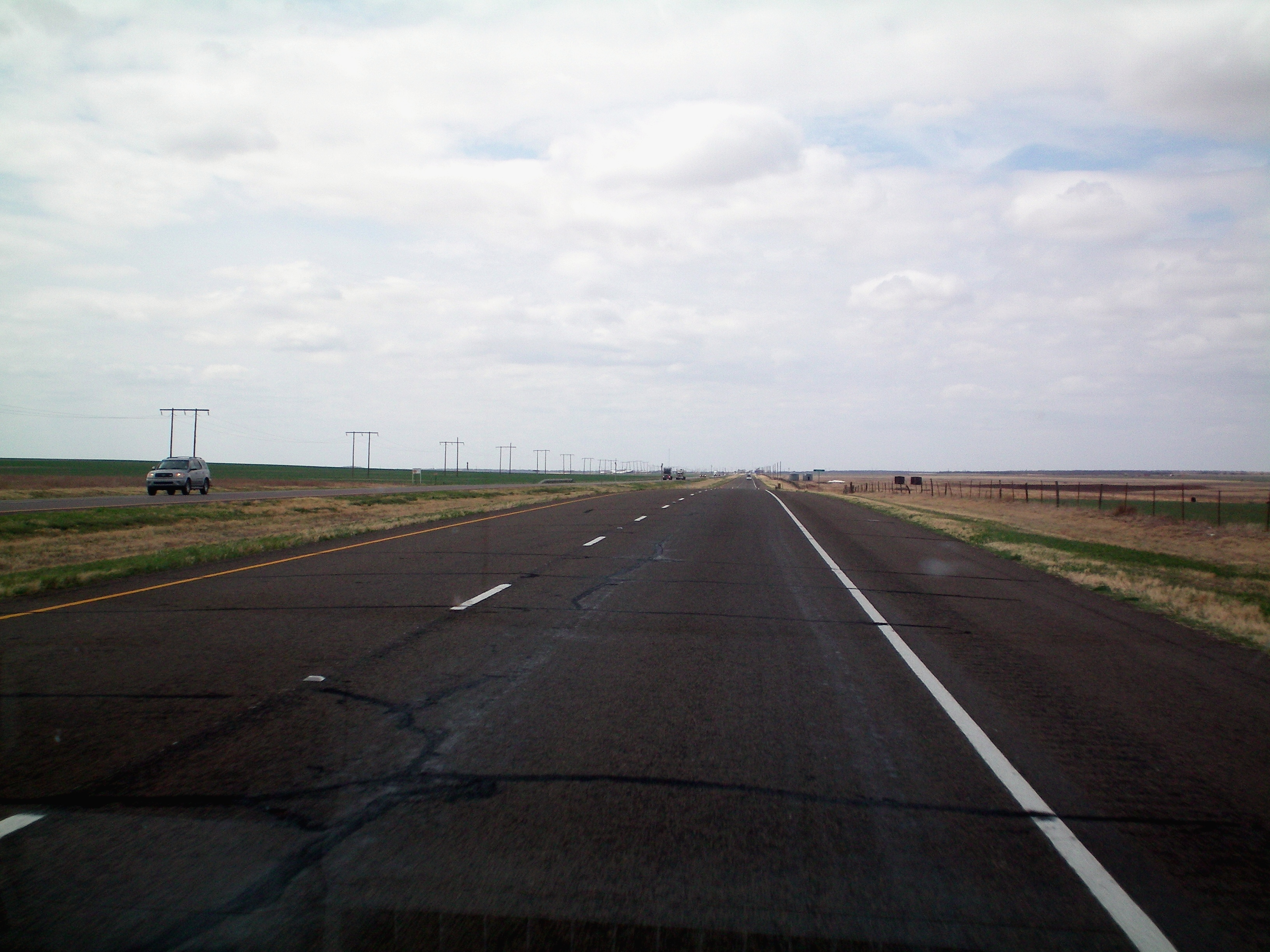
U.S. Route 287 in North Texas

The United States Numbered Highways are a nationwide grid of highways, but unlike the Interstate Highway System, there is no minimum design standard for these highways. This is clearly evident as some stretches of the U.S. Highways in Texas are nothing more than a two-lane rural road, while others are urban freeways. Although the U.S. Highways have been replaced for the most part by Interstate Highways for through traffic, the U.S. Highways still serve as important regional connectors. Several notable examples of U.S. Highways that are built to freeway standards include US 75 and US 80 in Dallas, US 59 and US 290 in Houston, and US 90 and US 281 in San Antonio.

The Interstate Highways have replaced several portions of the U.S. Highway network in Texas and as a result, they have been removed from the State Highway System. Several examples include US 81 from Fort Worth to Laredo in favor of I-35, US 75 from Dallas to Galveston in favor of I-45, and US 80 from Dallas to El Paso in favor of I-10 and I-20.

=== State Highways ===
SH 3,
SH NASA Road 1, and
SH OSR shields

A State Highway (SH) is funded and maintained by the state. State Highways have been assigned numbers between 1 and 365 with a few exceptions. There is also a State Highway 495 (renumbered from Farm to Market Road 495), as well as canceled routes SH 550 (a temporary designation for what is now part of I-169) and SH 824 (a temporary designation for what was later part of SH 24). NASA Road 1 and State Highway OSR are also in the State Highway network. The first 26 state highways were designated in 1917. Highways are not organized by directionality of the highway, instead they are generally numbered as they were when first built in the 1920s and 1930s. Most suffixed routes were eliminated by 1939, though SH 75A existed from 1946 to 1994 to match Oklahoma's SH 75A.

=== State highway loops and spurs ===
Loop, Spur and Beltway shields

State highway loops and spurs are short links in the State Highway network. They are generally numbered chronologically, and the lower numbers are older routes. Thus, spurs and loops are not related to similarly numbered main state highways. Typically, a loop connects two state or national highways, and a spur connects a state highway to a Farm to Market Road or other lower rated road. Many loops are either bypasses around significant portions of populated areas or older bypassed state or national highways. One loop—around Houston—is labeled Beltway 8. The first loops and spurs were defined in 1939; prior to that, the roadways had been suffixed segments of the main state highways of which they branched.

=== Business routes ===

Business Interstate Highway, U.S. Highway, State Highway and Farm to Market Road shields

Business routes are assigned to many old alignments of Interstate Highways, U.S. Highways, State Highways and Farm to Market Roads that have been bypassed. In addition to the numerical designation, a unique lettered suffix is assigned to each business route along the highway—for instance, Business Interstate Highway 40-D and Business Farm to Market Road 1960-A. (Not all routes start from A, and letters are sometimes skipped.) These letters are included on the sign in small print below the number. The sign specifications for business Interstate highways do not include the letter, but it has been added to many signs. Prior to 1991, business routes were assigned loop or spur numbers, but signed as business routes (with a BUSINESS plate above the shield for the main route). In 1991, all the business routes were assigned official designations, and their former loop and spur numbers were eliminated.

=== Farm to Market Roads ===
Farm to Market and Ranch to Market Road shields

Farm to Market Roads generally exist in rural areas. After the city or county acquires right-of-way, TxDOT builds and maintains the road. A number of these roads, generally west of US 281, are designated Ranch to Market Roads, and one—Ranch Road 1—is simply a Ranch Road, serving the LBJ Ranch. Farm to Market Roads were first designated in 1941 and Ranch to Market Roads in 1942. A number of Farm to Market Roads in urban areas were re-designated in 1995 as urban roads but, amid much controversy, the markers were not changed.

=== Park and Recreational Roads ===
Park Road and Recreational Road shields

Park Roads and Recreational Roads serve state or national parks and "recognized recreational areas"; the first ones were defined in 1937 and 1970 respectively. All roads in state parks are maintained by TxDOT, but are generally not numbered.

=== Toll roads ===
Toll Interstate Highway, U.S. Highway and state highway shields

One characteristic of the highways in Texas are its frontage roads; most freeways have continuous frontage roads, one-way in urban areas and two-way in rural areas. Several toll roads have one-way frontage roads—not necessarily continuous—with state highway numbers. Most toll roads are marked with special logos, but TxDOT has adopted a new marker as of 2006 for numbered toll roads.

=== War Highways ===
War Highways were designated from 1942 to 1943. All were cancelled or redesignated by 1947.

== See also ==
- List of Dallas-Fort Worth area freeways
- List of Houston highways
- List of highways in San Antonio
