= Defiance Press & Publishing =

- Founded: 2012
- Founder: David Thomas Roberts
- Country of origin: United States
- Headquarters location: Conroe, Texas, U.S.
- Nonfiction topics: Conservatism
- Imprints: Bluebonnet Kids, Keynote Books, Nicholsan Books, and Yellow Rose Romance

Defiance Press & Publishing is a politically conservative book publisher based in Conroe, Texas that was founded by David Thomas Roberts in 2012.

== History ==
The company was founded by David Thomas Roberts in 2012 to counter liberal publishers, saying:

For a long time the left was the champion of free speech. Look at the McCarthy era and look at the protesters in the sixties, in the Vietnam era. But today I think it’s mostly the conservative voices that are silenced...When you walked into a publishing conference, it was like walking into a Star Wars bar, with those creatures. My god. I couldn’t tell a man from a woman at those events."

In July 2021, the company began publishing a 12-book series Violent But True Bedtime Stories.

In 2023, the company sponsored the "Rally against Censorship" at the Lone Star Convention & Expo Center.
