= Texas Co-op Power =

Magazine

Texas Co-op Power magazine is the largest circulation monthly magazine in Austin, Texas. It goes to more than 1 million homes and businesses and is read by approximately 3 million people. The BPA audited statement for June 2009 put circulation at 1,188,965.

== History and profile ==
Founded in 1944 to assist newly formed electric cooperatives communicate and educate their members on such topics as using electric appliances and electrical safety, the monthly magazine has evolved into a feature publication with separate editions for 59 cooperatives. It is distributed in 227 of Texas’ 254 counties (2009 Directory, Texas Electric Cooperatives).

Texas Co-op Power’s goals are to enhance the quality of life of member-customers in an educational and entertaining format. Recent feature stories have included profiles of the late writer Elmer Kelton, football legend Sammy Baugh and the Quebe Sisters, as well as pieces on wildlife photography, fall gardens and Hurricane Ike.

== Audience ==
The magazine serves rural, small town, and suburban Texans who are members of electric cooperatives. It is published by Texas Electric Cooperatives, a statewide association. Nonmembers may subscribe by contacting the magazine.

== Subject matter ==
Texas Co-op Power is a publication that covers contemporary life in Texas, featuring articles on topics such as culture, history, recreation, nature, gardening, cooking, and travel within the state. It also provides information related to electric utilities and publishes work by Texas-based writers. Its content reflects both the state's historical heritage and its ongoing social and economic development.

Each subscribing cooperative may have as many as eight pages in the center of the magazine for local information and features.

== Books ==
Texas Co-op Power also publishes cookbooks and posters. The most recent cookbook is 60 Years of Home Cooking [2006, Texas Electric Cooperatives]. In addition to reprinting recipes published in the magazine, it describes the evolution of rural cooking as modern appliances such as microwaves and blenders gradually supplanted ice boxes and wood stoves.

== Archives ==
The archives of Texas Co-op Power reside at Texas Electric Cooperative headquarters on the 24th floor of the Westgate building, 1122 Colorado Street, Austin, TX. PDFs of the issues from 2004 to 2009 are online at www.texascooppower.com. The magazine's historic records are catalogued and available at the Dolph Briscoe Center for American History, University of Texas, Austin, TX.
