= Scurlock Publishing Company =

The Scurlock Publishing Company is a publishing and printing corporation located in Texarkana, Texas, that publishes a magazine and books related to American frontier history and the material culture of the 18th and 19th century. Its catalog includes the Muzzleloader, a national magazine devoted to the sport of muzzleloading, and The Book of Buckskinning.

This family owned and operated private company was founded as Rebel Publishing Company in 1974 by Oran H. Scurlock, Jr. and B. R. Hughes. The first issue of the Muzzleloader was published in March/April 1974. The idea for the magazine came about while Scurlock and Hughes were at the local shooting range during the monthly shoot of the Piney Woods Muzzleloaders, because there were few sources of information for black powder firearms in the early 1970s. The focus being on American history, and the reenactment thereof, it led to the publication of The Book of Buckskinning in 1981 (ISBN 0-9605666-0-0), ten chapters written by ten authors on different aspects of frontier living commonly known as buckskinning.

As of 2006, Scurlock Publishing produced eight books in the Buckskinning series, as well, as many other books on Colonial arms, Colonial and frontier clothing, gunsmithing and living history. The publisher is William H. Scurlock (born ca. 1958).
