= Texas Millionaires Chorus =

American all-male a cappella chorus

The Texas Millionaires Chorus is a men's a cappella chorus based in Fort Worth, Texas. A member of the Southwestern District of the Barbershop Harmony Society, the Millionaires have been performing throughout the Dallas/Fort Worth Metroplex for over 50 years. From 1951 to 1998, they were known as the Cowtown Chorus.

== Beginnings ==
In March 1951, while copy editor of the Fort Worth Press newspaper, Barney Morris, a former member of the Corpus Christi, Texas chapter, ran various articles inviting men to join a new barbershop chapter. This attracted a nucleus of approximately 35 men to form a temporary local chapter called the Cowtown Chorus that included several service men from Carswell Air Force Base, with previous singing experience from their home town chapters.

Mr. Morris petitioned the Barbershop Harmony Society for a temporary charter. It was issued on July 5, 1951, and the chorus had 34 men. Meetings were held each Monday evening at the downtown YMCA, radio station KWBU, and at the City Recreation Hall on Vickery Street. The Fort Worth chapter was sponsored by the Dallas 'Big D' chapter. Fort Worth was issued a permanent charter on July 5, 1952 with 48 men in the chorus.

== History ==
The Fort Worth chapter reached the "Century Club" of 100 members in 1959, then peaked with 104 members in 1960 under the leadership of President Glenn Hutton and Vice President Max Gwathmy.

From 1957 through 1982, the membership fluctuated from 33 to 49 members. Since 1982, membership has been 50 to 79 men.

After years as a mid B-level chorus in the Southwestern District, the Cowtown Chorus Phil McShan as director. McShan had been singing for several years with the International Champion Vocal Majority, and immediately the chorus saw a marked improvement in their performance level. The chorus approved and adopted a new name in 1997, the Texas Millionaires Chorus.

They scored a 66.3% average in 1997, the first contest with McShan directing, moving up to a 75.7% in 1998. The climb continued to a 79.2% in 1999, a 79.8% in 2000, and an 81.8% in 2001. After making an impact in their first few contests, the newly renamed Texas Millionaires leveled off for a few years, hovering at 2nd/3rd place in the district, right below the cutoff for a wild card invitation to the International competition.

== Scarecrows ==
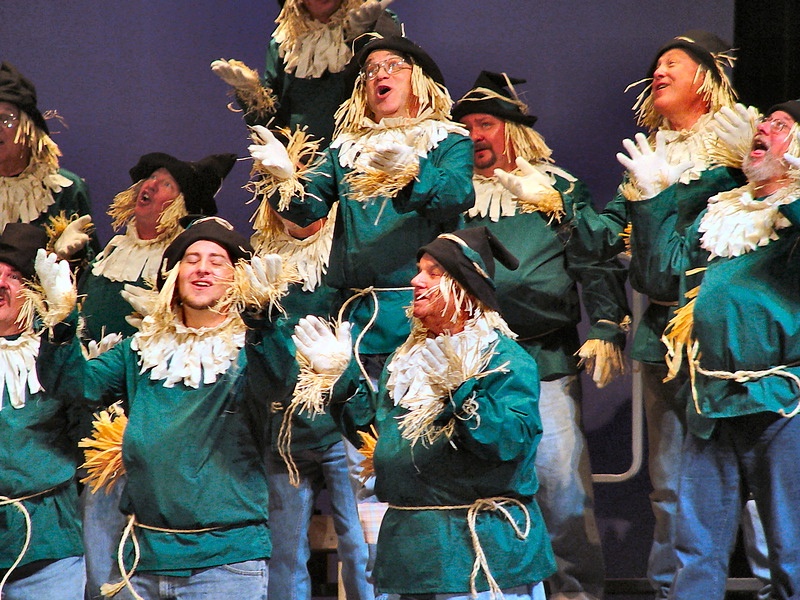
The Texas Millionaires "scarecrow" package

In 2004, the Millionaires began to evaluate what it might take for them to score high enough to qualify for the International competition. The idea of a theatrical package was agreed upon, with the chorus performing as scarecrows, singing If I Only Had a Brain from The Wizard of Oz, and a parody uptune about blackbirds. Cindy Hansen, who had done several gold medal winning visual packages in recent years, was the choreographer. In October 2004, the Millionaires competed in Richardson, Texas at district, and again placed third, scoring an 82.2% average, by far the best score in the chapter's history. The chorus received a wild card invitation to the International chorus contest in Salt Lake City for July 2005.

== Salt Lake City ==
The July 2005 International Chorus contest in Salt Lake City was a new experiment. 12 wild card choruses competed against each other on Thursday of the convention week. From those 12, 6 were selected to compete in the international chorus finals on Saturday. The Texas Millionaires were among the only choruses competing who were on their first trip to International. They made the finals and the "scarecrows" competed on Saturday, finishing 17th.

== Director changes ==
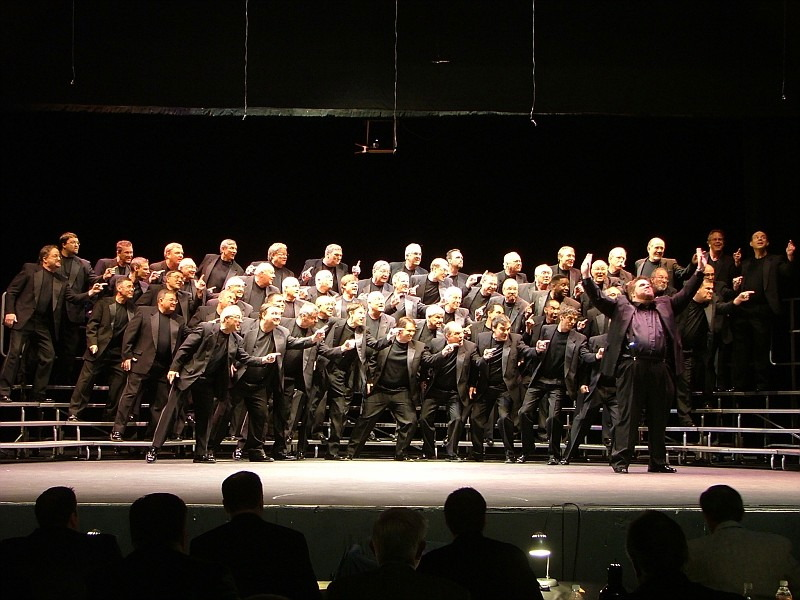
The Texas Millionaires Chorus, October 2006

In May 2005, director McShan retired, citing a growing family and his responsibilities in the Vocal Majority. After a short search, assistant director Tom Jackson took the reins as director. Jackson is a music educator himself, having earned a Bachelor of Music Education and a Master of Music in Choral Conducting from Texas Christian University. He has also won 4 gold medals singing bass in the Vocal Majority. In 2012, after a merger with another Chorus, Mark Holdeman stepped in as the director. He had been a former member, coach and assistant director of the Texas Milliionaires. In 2015 Holdeman stepped own and the chorus opted to have his wife, Lindsay Chartier, step in as the director, a position she currently holds.

== Recent competitions ==
The chorus competed in Corpus Christi, Texas on October 27, 2006, taking second place in the Southwestern District and earning a wild card invitation to the 2007 International convention in Denver, Colorado in July 2007, where they placed 24th. At the 2008 International chorus contest, held in Nashville, Tennessee, they placed 18th. They opted out of the 2009 contest in Anaheim, California because the Vocal Majority from nearby Dallas was competing.
