= Texas Border Coalition =

The Texas Border Coalition (TBC) is a group of elected officials and business leaders located along the border of Mexico and the U.S. state of Texas who make policy recommendations to help the Texas-Mexico border region grow and prosper economically. TBC is non-partisan and seeks to help Texas border communities speak with one voice on areas of agreement. The group primarily focuses on immigration and ports of entry, transportation, health care and education and workforce development.

TBC first rose to national prominence on May 16, 2008, when they filed a class action lawsuit against Michael Chertoff (Department of Homeland Security) and Robert Janson (US Customs and Border Protection) alleging government abuses in construction of the border fence.

Since then, TBC has been an active participant in state and federal policy debates that affect border communities. Recent initiatives have included attempts to dispel the myth of violence spilling over to the Texas side of the Texas-Mexico border and pushing for more personnel and improved infrastructure at land ports of entry.

== See also ==
- Mexico–United States border
- Port of entry
