= Texas Highway Patrol Association =

- Type: Charity group
- Founded: 1991
- Headquarters: Austin, Texas, United States

Texas Highway Patrol Association and Museum (THPA or THPM) is a charity group with its administrative offices in Austin, Texas. It maintains a museum in San Antonio and raises a very small amount of money, relative to the amounts donated, for deceased patrol officers. It is not affiliated with the Texas Department of Public Safety.

According to the THPA website, the organization began in 1991. The papers filed with the Texas Attorney General state that the date of incorporation was July 8, 1992, with the organization doing business beginning on the following day. KPRC-TV stated that it was founded in 1993. Lane Denton, the founder, used to be the executive director of the DPS Officer's Association. A jury ruled that Denton used $67,211 of the money from that association to give to a personal friend. This resulted in two felony convictions. Denton was given a six-year probation sentence. During that period he started the THPA family of organizations.

== Organization ==
The charity consists of three components: The Texas Highway Patrol Association, the Texas Highway Patrol Museum, and THPA Services, Inc. The association is a 501c6 group that is a membership association for highway patrol officers. It has its headquarters in a house in Austin, Texas. The museum is a non-profit organization based in San Antonio, Texas. THPA Services is a private for profit company that sells magazines and advertisements. All three groups have the same board of directors. Most employees are shared between the entities.

The group has five offices in the state of Texas. The group has a telemarketing division which, throughout Texas, has hundreds of workers. From 2004 to 2009, the telemarketing generated almost $12 million.

On December 14, 2011 the Texas Attorney General filed on behalf of the State of Texas a Temporary Restraining Order, a Temporary Injunction, and Permanent Injunction against the Texas High Patrol Association (THPA), Texas Highway Patrol Association, THPA Services, Inc., Timothy Tierney, Kenneth Lane Denton, Mark Lockridge, Steve Jenkins, Ruben Villalva, Jr., Ted Riojas, Fred Riojas, Gregg Greer, James Colunga, and Robert Bernard, Jr.

The Attorney General alleges in their lawsuit that the Texas Highway Patrol Association misled the public regarding the relationships between the Association, Museum and THPA Services Inc. The Texas Highway Patrol Association Hall of Fame and Museum is a 501(c)(3) public charity, but the Texas Highway Patrol Association is a 501(c)(6) non-profit labor or trade group organization. THPA Services Inc., is a for profit corporation that provides membership and other services to police membership associations and other private law enforcement organizations.

The museum is located in a one-story brick building at St. Mary's Street and South Alamo Street, in proximity to Downtown San Antonio. The museum is located in near the Alamo and the San Antonio Riverwalk. In 2011 John Tedesco of the San Antonio Express-News said that the museum does not have very many visitors.

In 2006 the group received $1,876,637 in donations. $1,135,631 was given to employees. Leah Napoliello, an employee of the Houston Better Business Bureau, said that this was "very excessive, and that's a very high salary for a relatively low income." The Better Business Bureau of Houston recommended against donating to the charity.

The State of Texas Attorney General further alleges that THPA makes claims regarding the services and benefits provided by their organization to their members and to the public that are overstated, false, or misleading. It is the conclusion of the Texas Attorney General that the defendants named in the suit engaged in false, misleading and deceptive acts and practices in the solicitation and acceptance of funds from the public representing that such funds would be used for the specific designated charitable purposes. Charitable funds were instead fraudulently used for Defendants' personal gain. It further alleges that members of THPA staff and Board of Directors have failed to exercise a degree of care in the conduct of their fiduciary duties, and breached their statutory fiduciary duties and their common law charitable trust fiduciary duties.
