= Texas State Guard Commanding General's Individual Award =

Military decoration

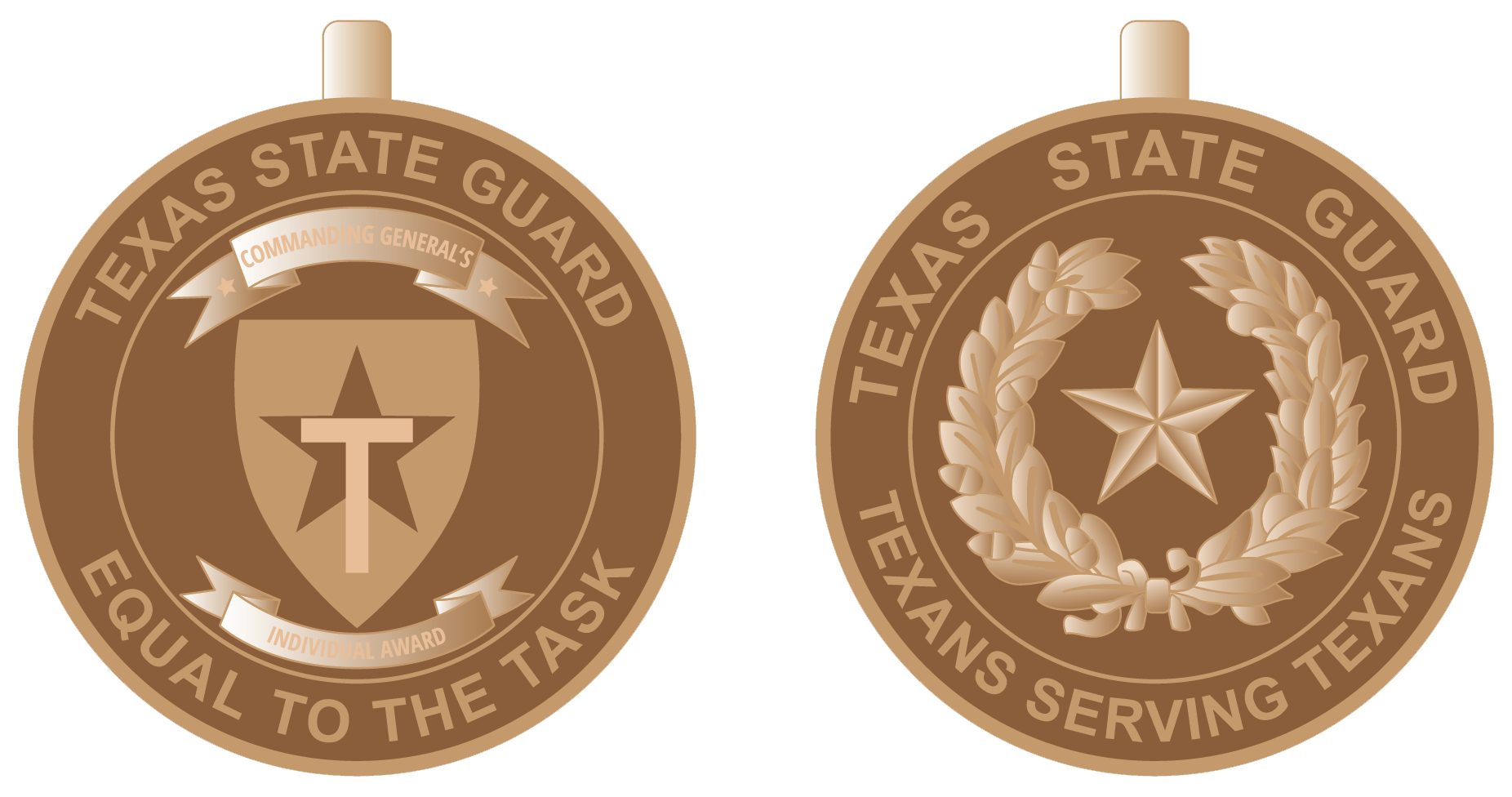
- Type: Military decoration
- Awarded for: Exceptional Performance
- Presented by: Texas Military Department
- Eligibility: Texas State Guard
- Status: Currently issued
- Established: May 12, 2021
- Service Ribbon

Precedence
- Next (higher): Texas State Guard Achievement Medal
- Next (lower): Texas State Guard Good Conduct Medal

The Texas State Guard Commanding General's Individual Award is the twelfth highest military decoration that may be conferred to a service member of the Texas State Guard.

== Eligibility ==
Any Texas State Guard commander grade O-5 and higher may issue this award to an individual at any Texas State Guard function or activity for exceptional performance as either a pocket award or through recommendation by unit commanders.

== Authority ==
TXSG Regulation 1000.01 dated 12 May 2021 upgraded the award from a ribbon to a medal.

== Description ==
The medal pendant is of bronze, 1-1/4 inches in diameter. On the obverse side of the pendant is the centered seal of the Texas State Guard. The seal is a shield on which is a recessed five-pointed star, one point up, over which is the raised letter, "T". At the top of the seal is a banner reading “COMMANDING GENERAL’S”, and at the bottom of the seal, a banner reading, “INDIVIDUAL AWARD”. The seal and banners are encircled by the words, "TEXAS STATE GUARD" on the upper arc and "EQUAL TO THE TASK" along the lower arc. On the reverse side of the pendant is a five-pointed raised star, one point up, 3/8 of an inch in diameter surrounded by a wreath formed by an olive branch on the right and a live oak branch on the left, surrounded by the words "TEXAS STATE GUARD" along the upper arc and "TEXANS SERVING TEXANS" along the lower arc, in raised letters.

== Ribbon ==
The pendant is suspended by a ring from a rayon moiré ribbon 1-3/8 inches long and 1-3/8 inches and wide, composed of three vertical stripes of Green #67129 (3/32 inches), Orange #67110 (1-3/16 inches), and Green #67129 (3/32 inches).

== Device ==
A bronze oak leaf cluster award device, is conferred for second and succeeding decorations. A silver leaf cluster is worn in lieu of five bronze leaves. Silver leaves are worn to the wearer's right of a bronze leaf.

== See also ==
- Awards and decorations of the Texas Military
- Awards and decorations of the Texas government
- Texas Military Forces
- Texas Military Department
- List of conflicts involving the Texas Military
