= Texas Municipal Retirement System =

Provides retirement benefits for cities

The Texas Municipal Retirement System (TMRS) is a statewide retirement system that provides retirement, disability, and death benefits for employees of participating Texas municipalities. TMRS was established in 1947 by Texas state law and is administered in accordance with the Texas Municipal Retirement System Act (Texas Government Code, Title 8, Subtitle G). Although established under state law, TMRS receives no state funding. The System offers a choice of benefits so that each participating city can design a plan to suit its needs and budget. Each city's plan is funded independently by that city. Retirement benefits for employees of participating cities are paid from the employees’ contributions, city contributions, and the System's investment income.

== Distinguishing Features of the System ==
TMRS administers a program for almost 1,000 Texas cities, providing retirement, disability, and survivor benefits to active and retired municipal employees of participating Texas cities. Distinguishing features of the System are:

- TMRS is a statewide retirement system that cities may elect to join
- TMRS is a “hybrid” cash-balance defined benefit retirement plan rather than a traditional, formula-based defined benefit plan
- TMRS does not receive any state funds and does not administer a health care plan
- Benefits are based on a Member’s account balance at retirement. The retirement benefit is funded through mandatory employee contributions, city contributions, and investment income
- Investment income pays approximately 70% of an employee’s retirement benefit

Conservative Plan Features - TMRS’ Investment Return Assumption is 6.75%. Each city's unfunded liability is amortized over a closed period of no more than 20 years. Each Member's benefits are advance funded over their working career. Contribution “holidays” are not allowed; every city must pay its required contribution.

Funded Status - The funded status (ratio) of TMRS, as a system, was 89.4% as of 12/31/2024. This funded ratio has trended upward over the past few years.

== Investments ==
TMRS administered $43.2 billion in assets as of December 31, 2024. The Investments Department at TMRS follows these Total Portfolio Performance Objectives:

- Achieve a Total Rate of Return, over rolling five-year periods, consistent with the assumed long-term rate of return on TMRS assets adopted by the board (currently 6.75%)
- Exceed an appropriate benchmark reflective of asset class participation over rolling five-year periods (i.e., Policy Index)

Diversification has been, and continues to be, implemented through a deliberate multi-year process. The current asset allocation strategy is expected to meet the long-term total return objective of 6.75%, consistent with the actuarial interest rate assumption for the plan. A detailed summary of investment operations, including performance of different asset classes and diversification progress, is found in the Investment Section of the Comprehensive Annual Financial Report.

== Governance ==
The TMRS Act provides that the administration of TMRS is entrusted to a six-member Board of Trustees, appointed by the Governor with the advice and consent of the Texas Senate. Board members serve on a volunteer basis and are employed by a TMRS-participating city. Per the Texas Constitution, Trustees continue to perform the duties of their office until a successor has been duly qualified. Board members serve staggered, six-year terms. The Board oversees the administration of TMRS and exercises fiduciary responsibility for investments.

== Location ==
TMRS is headquartered at 2717 Perseverance Drive, Suite 300, in Austin, Texas. Business hours are 8:00 a.m. to 5:00 p.m., Monday - Friday. The Member Service Center number is 800-924-8677.
