= Texas Fair Trade Coalition =

The Texas Fair Trade Coalition (TFTC) is a coalition of labor unions, environmental advocacy organizations, consumer groups, family farm advocacy organizations, faith organizations, professors and students that promotes democratic control over fiscal and social policies, social justice, workers' rights and livable wages, and sustainable development in Texas and worldwide through improvements to trade policy.

TFTC was instrumental in getting specific information on the presidential candidates' trade policy positions during the 2008 election through questionnaires. Now President Barack Obama commented to the Texas Fair Trade Coalition as reported in Reuters, that he would only support the Panama trade agreement "only if it does not bear the flaws of other NAFTA-style agreements."

The Texas Fair Trade Coalition also works on local issues including advocating for "sweat-free" city ordinances. Marc Jacobson, director of TFTC, said that 50-60 cities have passed ordinances that require city government to buy textiles and laundry services from companies that do not practice the worst forms of “sweat shop” worker abuse. The group is advocating for a similar ordinance in Dallas, Texas.

TFTC also plans a variety of educational events around trade policy.
