= Toll bridges, tunnels, and ferries in Texas =

Toll bridges, tunnels, and ferries in Texas lists all toll bridges, toll tunnels, and toll ferries in the US state of Texas.

== Toll bridges ==
- Laredo- Juarez-Lincoln International Bridge
- Laredo- Gateway to the Americas International Bridge
- Laredo- Colombia-Solidarity International Bridge
- Laredo- World Trade International Bridge
- Mountain Creek Lake Bridge
- Sam Houston Ship Channel Bridge
- San Luis Pass-Vacek Toll Bridge
- Gateway Bridge
- B and M Bridge
- Free Trade Bridge
- Veterans International Bridge
- B and P Bridge
- Pharr-Reynosa Bridge
- McAllen-Hidalgo-Reynosa Bridge
- Rio Grande City-Camargo Bridge
- Roma-Ciudad Miguel Aleman Bridge
- Eagle Pass Bridge #1
- Eagle Pass Bridge #2
- Del Rio-Ciudad Acuna International Bridge
- La Linda Bridge
- Presidio Bridge
- Ysleta-Zaragosa Bridge
- Good Neighbor Bridge
- Paso Del Norte Bridge

== Toll tunnels ==
- Addison Airport Toll Tunnel

== Toll ferries ==
- Los Ebanos Ferry
