= Texas County & District Retirement System =

State benefits agency in Texas, US

Created in 1967 by the Texas Legislature, the Texas County & District Retirement System (TCDRS) works with county and district employers to provide retirement, disability and survivor benefits to Texans. The system receives no funding from the State of Texas. Each plan is funded independently by the county or district and its employees. TCDRS net assets were $45 billion as of Dec. 31, 2021, and paid out $1.9 billion in benefits in 2021.

== Plan structure ==
Each county and district that participates in TCDRS maintains its own customized plan of benefits. This gives employers the flexibility and local control to select and pay for benefits based on their needs and budget. Employers review their plans annually and have the option to raise or lower benefits to control costs. Employees save for their own retirement over the length of their careers. TCDRS benefits are based on an employee's total savings balance, which includes interest and employer matching contributions. This structure prevents benefit manipulation—or “benefit spiking”—sometimes found in plans using final average salary benefit formulas. Benefits are funded by each county or district and its employees. Each employer must pay 100% of its required contribution each year. This ensures the necessary money is saved and avoids pushing retirement costs onto future generations of workers.

== Governance ==
A nine-member board of trustees appointed by the Texas Governor and confirmed by the Texas Senate governs TCDRS policies and operations. Trustees must be current members or retirees of the system. The board has oversight of all system operations including annual budget, policy determination, legislative proposals and investment policy.

== Investments ==
TCDRS is invested in a broadly diversified portfolio, which reduces total exposure to losses from any single asset class or investment.

== Benefits ==
How the plan works:

- A percentage of the employee's paycheck is deposited into his or her TCDRS account. That percentage, ranging from 4% to 7%, is set by the employer.
- The savings grow at an annual, compounded rate of 7%.
- Employees who retire receive a lifetime benefit that is based on the final account balance and employer matching.
