= Texas Soaring Association =

The Texas Soaring Association is a gliding club located 30 miles (48 km) south of Dallas Fort Worth airport in Midlothian, Texas.

Established in 1947, it was the site of the 2008 World Class Nationals Soaring Competition, held July 22–31, 2008. The club operates from their own gliderport, FAA designation TA11, with a 4000 ft grass north–south runway with a narrow 3000 ft paved section, and a 1000 ft grass crosswind runway.

One of the oldest and largest clubs in the country, Texas Soaring Association has over 150 members ranging from teenagers to veteran pilots with decades of experience.
