= Kettle Restaurants =

American restaurant chain

- Type: Private
- Industry: Food
- Founded: 1968
- Headquarters: Nacogdoches, Texas,

Kettle Restaurants is a Texas-based American restaurant chain.

The first location was opened by founder Harry Chambers, Sr. and his brother, Danny, in 1968 in Nacogdoches, Texas. He gained experience managing Toddle House restaurants in Baton Rouge while obtaining an engineering degree at LSU. Soon they opened additional locations. The chain began offering franchise locations some years later and reached a peak of over 265 locations (combined total of company owned + franchisee owned restaurants). These were concentrated in the southern half of the United States, from Florida west to New Mexico. The brothers sold the Houston-based chain and 119 locations (predominantly located in Texas, Oklahoma, and Louisiana) to private equity investors Stephen Portis and Eric Porten in September 1995. This move took the company from a publicly registered company to a private one. Most of the restaurants have since closed. As of 2008, there were 21 locations in Texas, Oklahoma, New Mexico, Arizona, and Tennessee. As of April 2024, the company operates 3 locations in Arizona, and Texas.

In 2016, officials from the United States Department of Labor’s Wage and Hour Division investigated several restaurants in Austin, Texas. Among the restaurants accused of wage and hour violations was a Kettle Restaurant at 2617 South Interstate 35 in Austin.

The Tucson location at 748 West 22nd Street failed food safety inspections at least twice in 2018.
