= USS Texas =

Four warships of the U.S. Navy have been named the USS Texas for the State of Texas:

- USS Texas (1892) was a pre-dreadnought battleship that was in commission from 1895 to 1911.
- USS Texas (BB-35) is a New York-class dreadnought battleship that was in commission from 1914 to 1948. In 1948, she was decommissioned and immediately became a museum ship near Houston.
- USS Texas (CGN-39) was in commission from 1977 to 1993. She was the second Virginia-class nuclear-powered guided-missile cruiser.
- USS Texas (SSN-775) was commissioned in September 2006, and she is in active service in the U.S. Navy. She is the second nuclear submarine of the Virginia class.

== See also ==
- USS Texan
- CSS Texas
