= Texas Fund Trapping Notice =

In Mechanics lien law a Texas Fund Trapping Notice is a preliminary notice that parties on construction projects who are not directly contracted with the owner send in order to preserve the right to file a mechanics lien in the event of nonpayment in Texas. This document is called a Fund Trapping Notice because its purpose is to inform the party making payment of the value of a contract to ensure that they retain sufficient funds to pay the party furnishing labor or materials.

There are two types of Texas notices that fall into the category of Fund Trapping Notices: the Two Month Notice and the Three Month Notice. Parties contracted with the owner are not required to send any notices. Those contracted with the general contractor, must send the Three Month Notice. Those contracted with anyone else, such as a subcontractor must send both a Two Month and Three Month Notice.
