= Texans for Fiscal Accountability =

Texans for Fiscal Accountability is a political action committee linked to consulting firm Murphy Turner and Associates.

== Background ==
Texans for Fiscal Accountability is a political action committee set up before the 2012 primary. Beginning in 2012 the group engaged in campaign activities according to subscription news website Capitol Insider.

== Funding ==
According to the Texas Ethics Commission, Texans for Fiscal Accountability has received contributions from Urban Rural Community Conservation Political action committee and four individuals.

== Action against Murphy Turner ==
Michael Quinn Sullivan filed the name Texans with Fiscal Accountability with the state of Texas, and then issued a cease and desist letter to Murphy Tuner and Associates after learning of Texans for Fiscal Accountability's activities.

Texans for Fiscal Accountability is not affiliated with Empower Texans.
