= Texas Civil Service Testing =

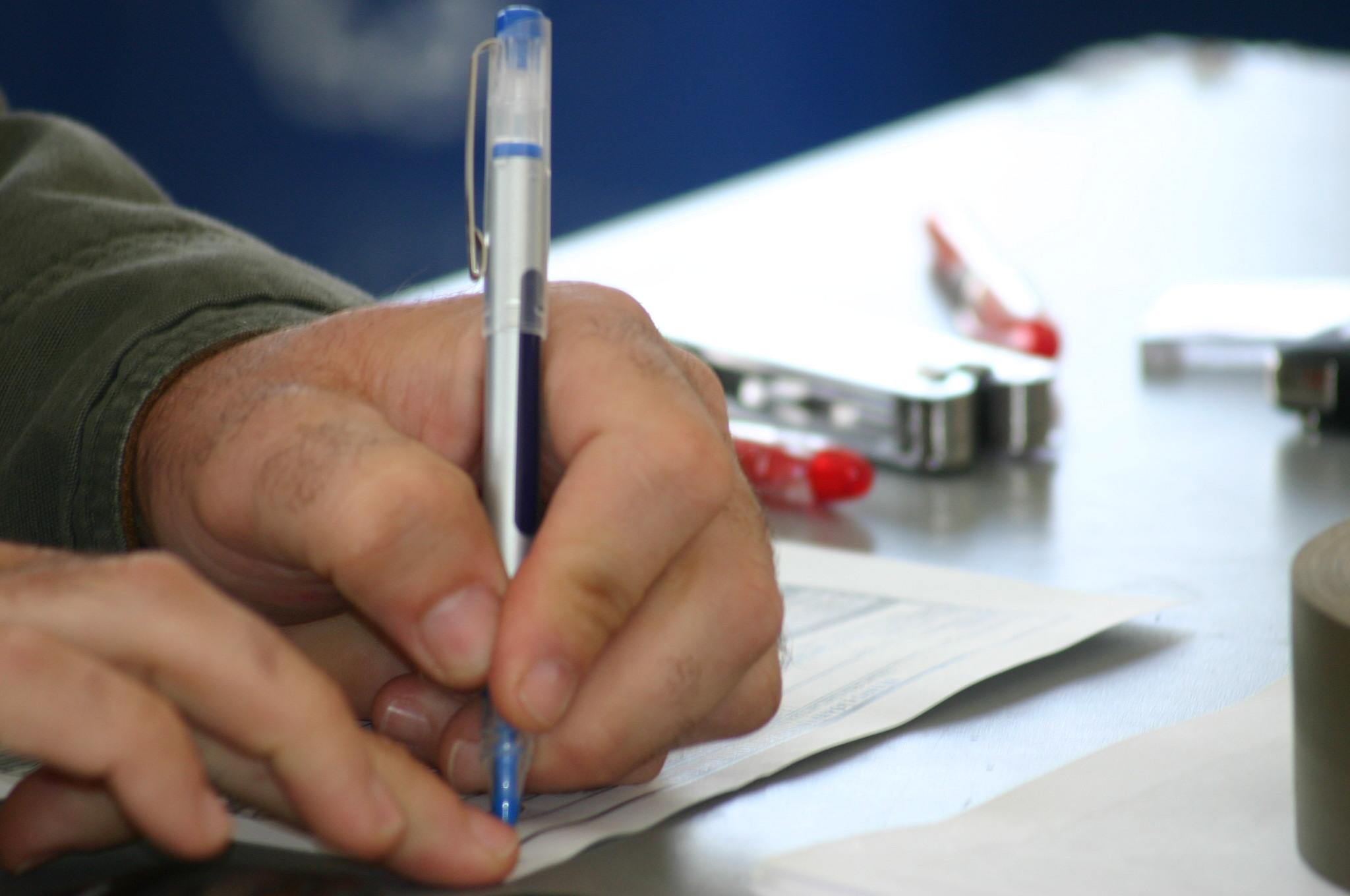
US Army 52864 Blue ink on the inspection sheet indicates to the students that they are a "go" during the sling load hands-on testing in the Camp Robertson Training Area Oct. 8

The Texas civil service testing process is a prerequisite to both fire and police sector positions as a way of ensuring an unbiased selection process. Civil service examinations consist of basic and/or advance arithmetic, money handling, word problems, and interpretation of graphs and statistics and focuses an abundant deal language skills. After the exam is administered, a chronologically ordered list is compiled based on candidate scores.

Civil service testing was intended as an alternative to the patronage system.

== Qualifications of a civil service department ==
In order to be considered as a civil service department:

- A city must have a population of 10,000 or more, as determined either

      by the most recent federal decennial census, or
      by a more recent annual population estimate from the Texas demographer under Chapter 468.   

- The city must pay its police department, its fire department or both (143.002(a)(1)(B)).
- At least 10 percent of registered voters in the city must have signed a petition to adopt Texas Chapter 143 (143.002(a)(1)(A)). A majority of votes is sufficient (143.004(c)).
- Subsection 143.002(c) of provides that a civil service department will not be affected if the municipality’s population changes to no longer meet the population requirement. This appears to apply starting when the election to adopt occurs.
- If at least one year has passed since the city adopted Texas Chapter 143, then a petition to require a popular vote to reverse that adoption may be validated by vote of at least 10 percent of registered voters in the city (143.004(e)) who also comprise 20 percent of the number of voters who voted in the most recent municipal election. If it is validated, the item to reverse adoption must appear on at the next municipal general election ballot. (143.004(d)). A majority of votes is sufficient (143.004(c)).˜˜˜˜

== Current issues ==
In 2013, City of Austin fire department underwent an investigation from the US department of justice in regards of alleged discrimination against minorities and their hiring process. The Fire Department has been “engaged in a pattern or practice of discrimination against Hispanics and African Americans with respect to employment opportunities in sworn positions.”

In 2009, The Austin Fire Department fired down in its ranks to promote 2 untested lieutenants to newly created Assistant Chief positions, passing over a significant number of more experienced Captains, Battalion Chiefs, and Division Chiefs. The firm representing 2 long time AFD officers and the emergency responders for equality (an organization founded by concerned AFD fire fighters) to challenge AFD’s use of race in deciding whom to appoint to the new assistant chief position. Following mediation, the parties reached an amicable settlement awarding plaintiffs $850 thousand in damages and attorney fees. In addition to injunctive relieve.

In November 2011, the Austin Fire Department spent close to $1 million to hire 80 new employees in responses to the discriminating allegations. The civil service test is intended to reduce the process of the Spoil System, but a promotion hinders on other aspects than that of a test score. There are allegations that subclasses of applications are at a disadvantage when it comes to the test.

== See also ==
- Civil service commission
- competitive examination
- Public utilities commission
- Spoils system
- public administration on a merit system
