= Fort Worth Dallas Birthing Project =

The Fort Worth/Dallas Birthing Project is a project which connects volunteers, called "SisterFriends", with high-risk, pregnant teenagers in North Texas, with the aim of reducing the area's infant mortality rate. Volunteers provide emotional and practical support during pregnancy and for one year after birth. Since the program began in 1997, it has helped more than 140 mothers, mainly in the African-American and Hispanic communities of Tarrant County, Texas, where the infant mortality rate is higher than the state and national averages.

The project also runs the Aintie-Tia Program which trains volunteers to support African-American women between 18 and 35 during and after pregnancy with pre- and post-natal education and assistance during labor. Funding is provided by the University of North Texas Health Science Center at Fort Worth and the Amon G. Carter Foundation.

In 2008, the National Institutes of Health funded a study into the effects of the program on birth outcomes.
