= Daily Deal =

Daily Deal may refer to:

- Deal of the day (ecommerce)
- The Deal (magazine)
