= Texas Mini GP Series =

The Texas Mini GP Series is an American organization that promotes and hosts small motorcycle road races in Texas. Most races are held at local kart tracks, but others are organized in conjunction with the Central Motorcycle Roadracing Association at larger tracks like Oak Hill Raceway and Texas World Speedway.

Many well known riders and actors have raced with the TMGPS, including Nicky Hayden, Ben Spies, Logan Young, Will Gruy, Joe Prussiano, Phillip Fisher and Griff Allen.

In the beginning, the ride of choice was the Yamaha YSR50; but today the pits are littered with everything from YSR's and NSR's to XR100's, TTR125's, and Groms.

Popular bikes are KX65's and KLX110's fitted with 12” tires on custom rims. Mitas and PMT and two most popular tire makers, although Bridgestone, Dunlop, and Pirelli now offer tires in this size as well. Newer bikes by OVHALE are bringing back GP style frames which run 10” tires.

Classes are run in Endurance and Sprint races. 4-6 Hr Endurance races typically held at each event with 6-8 lap Sprint races on Sunday.

The various classes run in 2020 were as follows:

Endurance classes:

- GROM
- Formula 7 – Novice
- Formula 7 – Expert
- Formula 6
- Formula 5

Sprint Classes:

- Supersport
- Superbike
- Scooter
- Formula 7 - Novice
- Formula 7 - Expert
- Formula 7 - Lightweight
- Formula 7 - Heavyweight
- Formula 6 - Novice
- Formula 6 - Expert
- Formula 6 - Lightweight
- Formula 6 - Heavyweight
- Formula 5 - Novice
- Formula 5 - Expert
- Formula 5 - Lightweight ***New
- Formula 5 - Heavyweight ***New
- Dinosaurs
- Double D
- Ladies
- GROM
- GP F6 ***New Name
- GP F7 ***New Name
- 12 & Under
- Unlimited
- Backwards - Novice
- Backwards - Expert
- Jr. Motard
- Motard - Novice
- Motard - Expert
- Pit Bike 50
