= Killing of Doris Angleton =

Texas (USA) socialite and murder victim

Doris Angleton
- Doris Angleton
- Born: Doris Elizabeth McGown; April 11, 1951
- Died: April 16, 1997 (aged 46); Houston, Texas, U.S.
- Cause of death: Gunshot wounds
- Other name: Doris Beck
- Education: University of Texas

Doris Elizabeth Angleton (née McGown; (also Beck) April 11, 1951 – April 16, 1997) was an American socialite and murder victim. Her husband, Robert Angleton, had been accused of planning the crime. His brother, Roger Nicholas Angleton, was arrested in possession of a contract for a murder in exchange for $100,000 in addition to cassettes containing audio recordings supposedly of conversations between himself and Robert planning the murder of a woman named Doris in exchange for money. Roger killed himself in custody, after writing a suicide note in which he admitted to killing his sister-in-law and claimed his brother had no involvement. Robert was found not guilty by a Houston jury in 1999.

== Early life ==
Doris Elizabeth McGown was the first child born to Alfred Randolph McGown, a Dow Chemical engineer, and his wife, Ann McGown (née Bain). She grew up in Lake Jackson, Texas, and had one sibling, Steven Randolph McGown. She graduated from the University of Texas at Austin with a degree in speech pathology. After graduation, she began a career as a schoolteacher, and later became a sales representative for a pharmaceutical firm.

== Marriages ==
In 1976, McGown met William Beck, a representative for an office products company. They married and moved to Clear Lake City, a suburb of Houston. She met Robert Angleton, a successful bookmaker, at a bar on Houston's West Loop when she was 28 years old. According to Robert, he and Doris met because Beck, her husband, was a client of his bookmaking business. Both Robert and Doris, although already married, were attracted to each other, and eventually divorced their spouses; they married in 1982. On August 1, 1984, Doris gave birth to twins, Nicole and Alessandra.

Robert earned an estimated $2 million a year by running a sports betting scheme. He managed to do this by becoming a police informant and reporting his rivals to the Houston Police Department. Robert later moved his family to the wealthy River Oaks area of Houston.

Although her friends believed that she was happy, Doris had reportedly told others that she wanted out of her marriage when she started talking to others in online chat rooms. She began an online and then in-person affair with a man from New Jersey. In February 1997, Doris initiated divorce proceedings, seeking fifty percent of the assets she shared with Robert. Robert had offered her half of his purported estate or $1.5 million. Doris suspected more wealth existed and threatened to turn him in to the Internal Revenue Service in an attempt to gain more of his estate during the divorce.

== Murder ==
On April 16, 1997, Robert expressed concern when Doris failed to show up for their twin daughters' softball game. After the game, he drove the girls home and found the front door ajar, at which point he called the police. An officer discovered Doris's body. She had sustained multiple gunshot wounds to the face and chest.

Around the time of the murder, Doris's brother-in-law, Roger Angleton, had been arrested in California on unrelated charges. He missed his April 16 court date in that case. On April 21, he was stopped at the Dallas/Fort Worth International Airport with two guns in his luggage, and fled before being arrested. Police searched Roger's abandoned suitcase, which revealed him to be Doris's killer. Roger was eventually found by police in the Las Vegas city jail, having been arrested for providing false identification to police. He died after cutting himself in a Houston prison cell more than fifty times with a disposable razor. He left behind a suicide note clearing his brother of the murder. Robert was later found not guilty in his wife's death.

Robert's income was investigated. As it was earned via an illegal sports betting operation, the U.S. Department of Justice indicted and jailed him. While awaiting trial, Robert fled to the Netherlands, where the Dutch government apprehended him. A Dutch court ruled that he could not be extradited on a charge related to the murder of his wife because he had already been found not guilty. However, they ruled that he could be extradited on the tax evasion charges.

He was subsequently convicted of tax evasion and passport fraud and was sentenced to twelve years in prison. He was incarcerated in the Federal Correctional Institution, Terminal Island in San Pedro, Los Angeles. He was released on January 27, 2012, whereupon he was indicted for his wife's murder a second time, this time in federal court. Shortly thereafter he went on the run.
