= Texas Bureau of Child and Animal Protection =

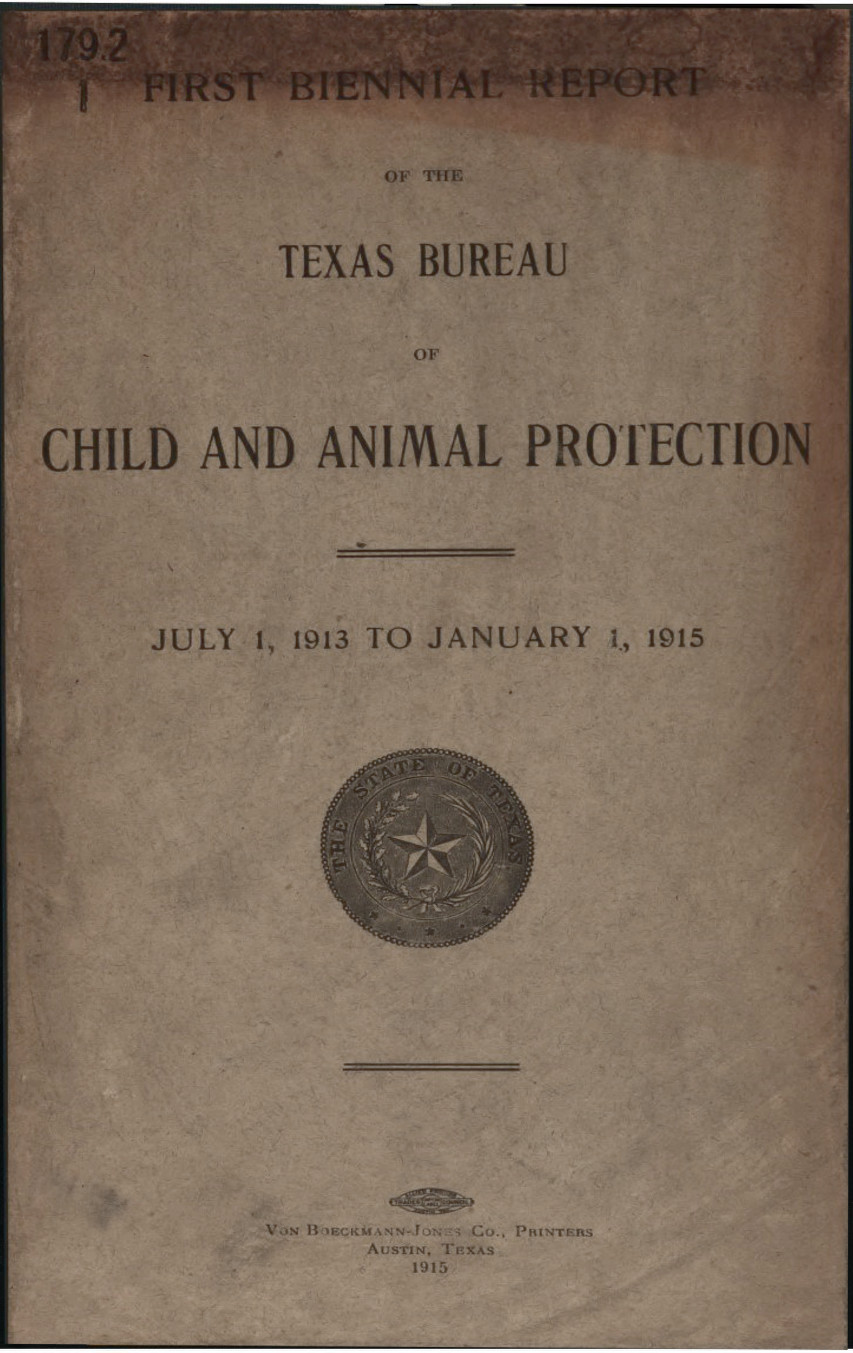

The Texas Bureau of Child and Animal Protection is (about) the earliest documented form of child protection. The Bureau was created by the 33rd Texas Legislature by adopting HB-540 on March 29, 1913, go become effective on July 1, 1913. This appears to be one of the earliest known forms of Child and Animal Protection in the state.

The legislators:

Makes it the duty of said Bureau to secure the enforcement of the laws for the protection of wrongs to children and dumb animals as now defined and as hereafter may be defined by law, to appoint local and state agents to assist in this work, to assist the organization of district and county societies and to give them representation in the State Bureau, to aid such societies and agents in the enforcement of the laws for the prevention of wrongs to children and dumb animals as prescribed by law now existing or which may hereafter exist, and to promote the growth of education and sentiment favorable to the protection of children and dumb animals.
