= Women's Shelter of South Texas =

American non-profit organization

The Women's Shelter of South Texas was established in 1978 to provide emergency shelter and support for victims of domestic violence. Services expanded in 1993 to include survivors of sexual assault. New facilities were built in 1994 that allows up to 65 clients. In 1995, the Batterers Intervention and Prevention Program (BIPP) was established. In 1987 the agency expanded to provide services to rural areas in Alice, Beeville, Kingsville, and Sinton. The Shelter wants to include offices and a full staff in each location. The organization continues to educate and prevent sexual assault in South Texas.

== Programs ==
=== Batterers Intervention and Prevention ===
Batterers Intervention and Prevention Program (BIPP) is intended to promote safety for victims of domestic violence. There are men's, women's, and Spanish-speaking groups that offer aid to victims. In most cases, the BIPP becomes a mandatory court-order for domestic violence perpetrators.

=== Clinical Counseling ===
Clinical Counseling is offered to clients by providing educational and supportive aid in an individual or group setting. Services offered to children include play therapy, after-school and Saturday support groups.

=== Community Education ===
Community Education is available in the agency's service area. Presentations and training events are intended to raise awareness of domestic and sexual violence throughout the community.

=== Emergency Shelter ===
The organization has a variety of programs to serve the community needs. There is an Emergency Shelter that provides shelter to women and their children. The shelter operates 24 hours daily throughout the year.

=== Legal Advocacy Services ===
Legal Advocacy Services are available to individuals to discuss their particular situation and needs, answer questions and provide appropriate information. Court accompaniment is also provided to clients by staff and volunteers. Areas of assistance and information include Emergency Protective Orders, Protective Orders, Police Reports, Crime Victims Compensation, Divorce and Child Custody, Child Support, Battered Immigrant Woman assistance under the Violence Against Women Act and the VINE program (Victim Information Notification Everyday).

=== Primary Prevention ===
Primary Prevention invites the whole community to examine the root causes of domestic and sexual violence prevention. Primary prevention also seeks find out new information, new experiences and new perspectives to end domestic violence. The Coastal Bend Coordinated Community Response Coalition (CBCCRC) on Domestic Violence and Sexual Assault is part of the primary prevention. The partnership of the CBCCRC and Women's Shelter of South Texas has worked to meet the needs of victims, hold offenders accountable, and to educate the Coastal Bend community on preventing domestic violence and sexual assault.

=== Rape Crisis Service ===
The Rape Crisis Service utilizes volunteers to provide on-call support for rape victims. Individual and group counseling is also offered to victims for long-term effects of the assault victim. Counseling is offered to families and friends to address their concerns.

=== Rural Outreach Services ===
Rural Outreach services are available in rural areas that include safety planning, peer counseling, community education, emergency shelter transportation and legal advocacy. Transportation is provided to shelter and safe houses for victims fleeing abuse. The agency is works with law enforcement to ensure safe passages for shelter victims.

=== Youth Services ===
Youth Services are provided for child victims of domestic and sexual violence. Support services include counseling, play therapy for young children, mentoring, family activities, age-appropriate activities, and an eight-week summer Kids Camp. The shelter provides education on health, safety, and education for victims of domestic violence.

=== Staff ===
The Women's Shelter is operated by full and part-time employees who serve as managing staff, administration, case managers, and more. Volunteers must undergo 20 hours of training before working at the Shelter.

== Contact Information ==
To contact the Women's Shelter of South Texas the following address is available

Women's Shelter of South Texas
P.O. Box 3368
Corpus Christi, TX 78463-3368

24-hour Domestic Violence Crisis Line & Emergency Shelter: 361-881-8888 or 1-800-580-4878
