= List of Houston highways =

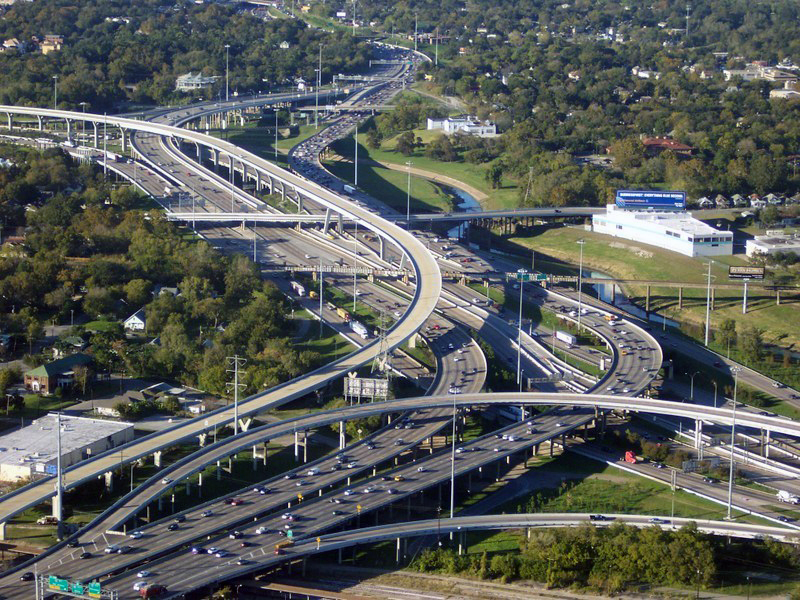
Interstate 10/U.S. Route 90 - Interstate 45 interchange northwest of downtown Houston.

This is a list of highways in the Houston–Pasadena–The Woodlands metropolitan area.

== Freeways ==
=== Present ===
Designation	Common name	Year of First Freeway Section	Maximum width: mainlanes (HOV)	Maximum Traffic Count, 2001 (AADT)	Maximum Traffic Count, 2009 (AADT)	Maximum Traffic Count, 2012 (AADT)
I-10	Baytown-East Freeway	1953	10	225,640	195,000	168,000
I-10	Katy Freeway	1956	26(4)	238,520	268,000	360,000
I-45	Gulf Freeway	1948	8(1)	269,570	266,000	245,000
I-45	North Freeway	1959	10(1)	291,470	317,000	312,000
I-69 / US 59	Eastex Freeway	1953	10(1)	211,860	195,000	205,000
I-69 / US 59	Southwest Freeway	1961	13(1)	379,550	329,000	318,000
I-610	610 Loop	1952	10	293,460	288,000	292,000
Sam Houston Tollway	Beltway 8	1982	9	202,900	189,000	203,410**
Fort Bend Tollway	Fort Bend Parkway Toll Road	2004	4		9,471**	
Hardy Toll Road		1987	6	59,220	61,000	63,000
Westpark Tollway	Fort Bend Westpark Tollway	2004	4		119,385**	
US 90	Crosby Freeway	1991	6	31,090	46,000	40,000
US 290	Northwest Freeway	1975	8(1)	262,970	230,000	239,000
Spur 5	Spur 5	1988	6	54,240	37,000	33,000
Spur 330	Decker Drive	2001	6	32,890	37,000	47,000
Spur 527	The Downtown Split	1961	6*	93,410	64,000	65,000
SH 99 / SH 99 Toll	Grand Parkway	1994	4	36,200	68,000	47,000
SH 146	Baytown Freeway	1996	8	74,670	73,000	76,000
SH 225	La Porte Freeway	1966	8	152,780	133,000	113,000
SH 249 / Tomball Tollway	Tomball Parkway	1990	8	119,780	142,000	151,000
SH 288	South Freeway	1980	8	178,490	172,000	163,000
FM 1764	Emmett F. Lowry Expressway		4	48,050	40,000	35,000
** For these toll roads, this represents the highest AADT as measured at a toll booth, but not necessarily the highest traffic at any point along the toll road.

=== Future ===
- Red Bluff Freeway - planned from State Highway 146 southeast of Houston to Beltway 8. Only frontage roads have been built.
- SH 99 Toll - Sections A, B, and C of the Grand Parkway are in various stages of the planning process.
- Spur 5 - south-southeast of downtown. The mainlanes planned to be built from its present terminus near University Drive (adjacent to the University of Houston) to south of Beltway 8.
- Fort Bend Tollway - The Fort Bend Tollway is planned to eventually be extended from its northern terminus at US 90A to the southwest corner of the 610 Loop.
- Hardy Toll Road - The Hardy Toll Road has a proposal to be extended from its southern terminus at the North Loop to Downtown Houston.
- Fort Bend Westpark Tollway - The Fort Bend section of the Westpark Tollway, known as the Fort Bend Westpark Tollway, will eventually be extended west to the growing suburb of Fulshear. It will then turn north and end at IH-10 around Pederson Road.

== Limited-access highways ==
=== Present ===
- Allen Parkway - Between I-45 and Shepherd Drive, a distance of 2.3 miles (3.7 km), Allen Parkway is a limited access parkway.
- Grand Parkway - Parts of section D (south of the Westpark Tollway) are now being brought up to full freeway standards.
- Memorial Drive - From Houston Street to just west of Shepherd Drive, a distance of 2.3 miles (3.7 km), Memorial Drive is a limited-access parkway with exits at Heights Blvd./Waugh Drive and Shepherd Drive.
- U.S. Highway 90 Alternate — South Main Street — south-southwest of downtown from I-610 to near the Southwest Freeway.
- I-69 / US 59 - From the Harris-Fort Bend county line to the Harris-Montgomery county line for a total distance of 75 miles. Interstate 69 will travel from the U.S.–Mexico border in Brownsville, TX to the U.S.–Canada border in Port Huron, MI when completed in the future. US 59 travels from the U.S.–Mexico border in Laredo, TX to the U.S.–Canada border near Lancaster, MN. 35 miles of US 59 have been designated and dual signed as I-69/US 59 northeast of Downtown Houston. 28 miles of US 59 have been designated and dual signed as I-69/US 59 southwest of Downtown Houston. 12 miles of US 59 have been designated and dual signed as I-69/US 59 through Downtown Houston.

== Gallery ==
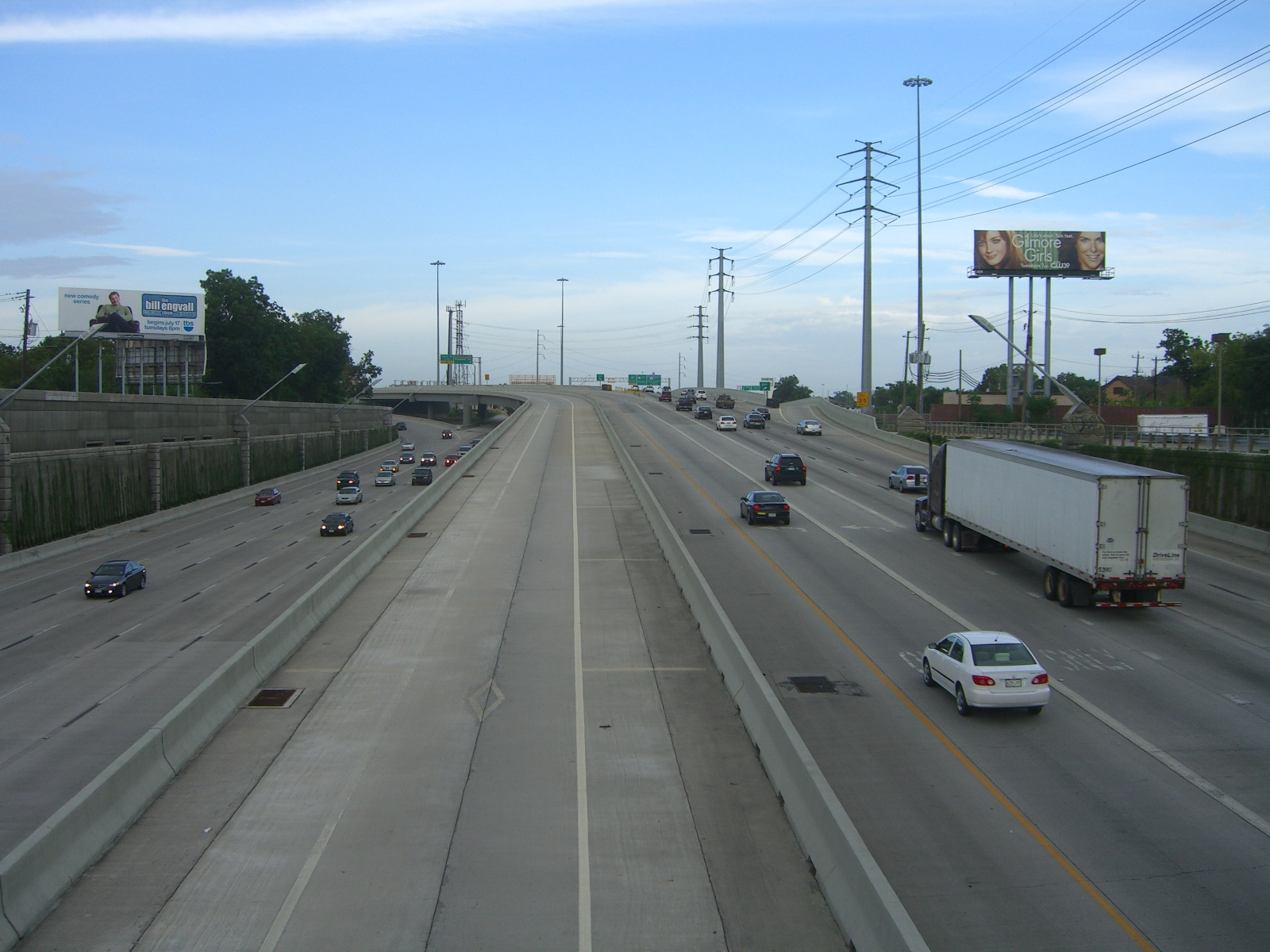
I-69/US 59 in Houston looking east

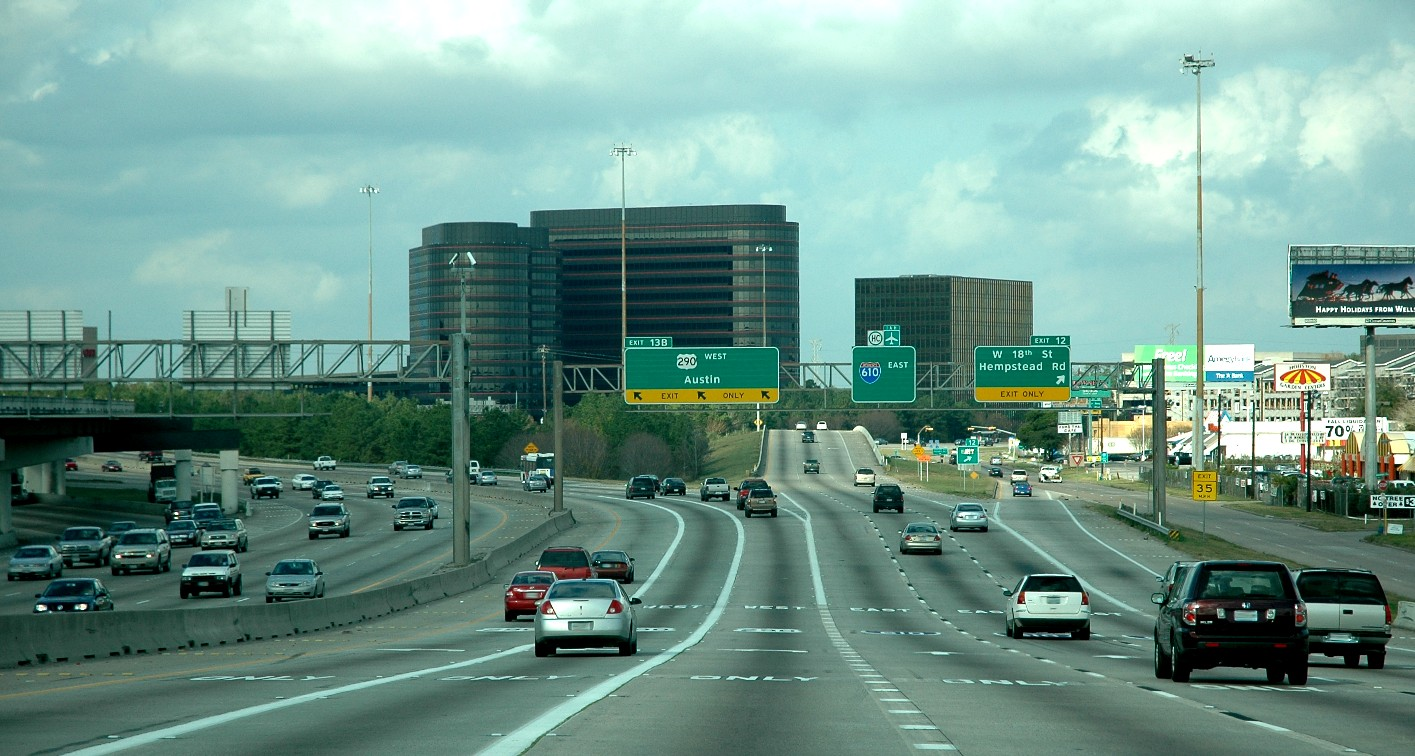
U.S. Highway 290 intersection with Interstate 610 in Houston

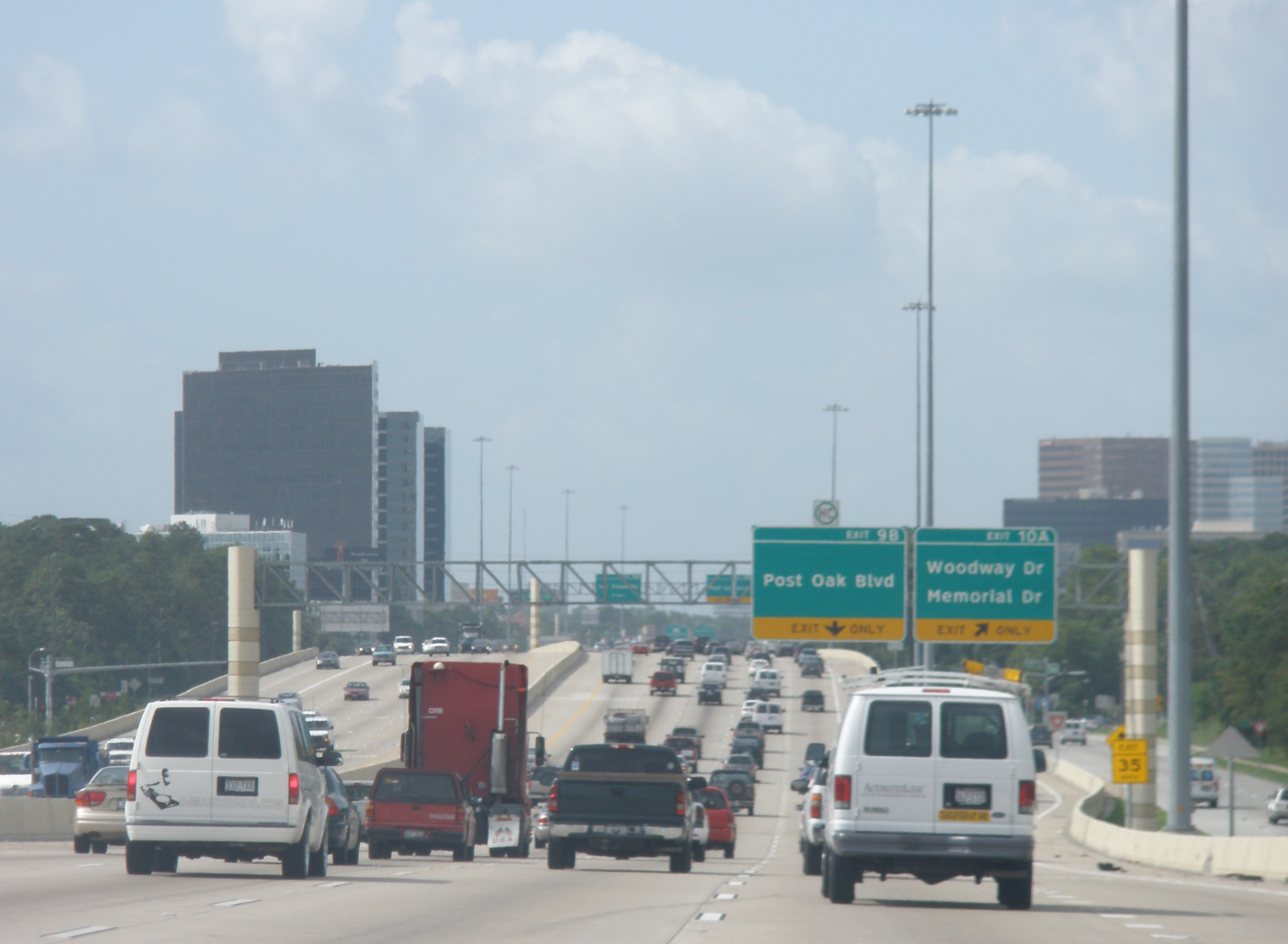
I-610 "West Loop South" just south from I-10 west
