= Texas Junior Golf Tour =

Texas golf tour for ages 8-25

The goals of the Texas Junior Golf Tour (TGJT) is to prepare junior golfers, male and female, for national competitions while assisting and educating members on elite junior golf opportunities to enhance golf and academic scholarship opportunities. The TJGT is a regional tour in Texas that offers 85 competitive junior golf tournaments for national and international contestants.

== Overview ==
The TJGT was founded in Austin in 1989 when parents and coaches of high school golfers realized there was a need for a higher level regional junior golf tour for their children in the Fall and Winter to supplement the high school golf season. TJGT is focused on golfers ages 12–18, however, throughout the years, the tour has created the 'Elite Mini Tour' (ages 8–12) and the TCAT (Texas Collegiate Amateur Tour) (ages 19–25). Although those sub tours have far fewer events, they are still highly competitive. The most attractive aspect of the tour is that TJGT and AJGA (American Junior Golf Association) have networked such that TJGT tournaments offer AJGA performance based entry. Also, TJGT tournaments are ranked nationally by AJGA, Golfweek, and Junior Golf Scoreboard. Despite it being a state tour, there are members from all over the country and international members. A few countries that are represented are Mexico, Scotland, Venezuela, Ecuador, Canada, and Korea. There is a select board of directors composed of ex-college coaches and parents of distinguished players that makes many of the financial decisions, endorsement deals, and obtaining the sites where the tournaments will be held. Some endorsements include Titleist, Oakley, Supreme Golf, and Galleria Dallas, and the Texas Association of Golf Coaches.

TJGT utilizes a points system. The top 15 finishers in each tournament receive points (the amount is based on what place one took in the tournament and the magnitude of the tournament i.e.: regular versus major versus invitational). At the end of the year, there is a tournament of champions where the top point leaders will play one final tournament. These points also determine the player of the year and who makes the All Tour Team. This All Tour Team gets recognition from many college coaches and helps vault them into the eyes of top division 1 programs.

== Alumni ==
As many golfers graduate this tour and go on to play college golf, there are some who have made it to the PGA and LPGA. Notables include Jhonattan Vegas and Stacy Lewis, both winners on the professional level. Notable collegiate players include Bronson Burgoon, who was a major factor in the NCAA Division One Championship Texas A&M team.

== Tournament opportunities ==
The Texas Junior Golf Tour offers high competition tournaments all year long throughout Texas. While most are located around Houston, Dallas, Austin, and San Antonio, there are plenty of tournaments throughout other areas of Texas. The tour has grown from having 8 tournaments to 85 tournaments per year. The most unusual aspect of the TJGT is that it offers tournaments throughout the fall and winter months. College coaches like this because kids show their love and desire for the game when playing in the cold and rainy months. Of the 85 tournaments offered, 5 of them are elite invitational tournaments and 11 major tournaments. These provide even greater competition for the junior golfers. Tournaments are held at may different locations throughout Texas. Including Barton Creek Resort and Spa, Horseshoe Bay Resort, TPC Las Colinas, The Woodlands Country Club, University of Texas Golf Club, The Traditions Club at Texas A&M, and many more.

== College golf ==
This tour provides kids exposure to college coaches from across the United States. As a result of this, TJGT has had more than 3300 TJGT graduates who have gone on to play collegiate golf. With obtaining collegiate golf scholarships as a main goal of the tour, the staff presses to give kids all the college exposure that they need. Signees have ranged from Oklahoma State to small NAIA and NJCAA schools. No matter the magnitude of the golf program at these schools, TJGT helped give players the opportunity needed to allow them to play at the collegiate level.

== Competing/similar tours ==
The most competitive tour with TJGT is the American Junior Golf Association (AJGA). This is a national tour with 6 tournaments in Texas that draws the best of the best. Alumni of this tour include Tiger Woods, Phil Mickelson, and Anthony Kim. For statewide tours, Texas Legends Junior Tour (TLJT) is the most competitive. The Legends Junior Tour has 12 golf tournaments throughout the state of Texas and is home to such prestigious events as the HP Byron Nelson Junior Championship, Texas Cup Invitational, Jackie Burke Cup, George Hannon Junior Invitational and Texas State Junior Championship.
