= Frontier Fiesta =

At the University of Houston in April

- Frequency: Annually in the Spring
- Location: University of Houston
- Inaugurated: 1940, 1941, 1947-1959
- Most recent: 1991–2019, 2021–
- Website: uh.edu/fiesta

Frontier Fiesta is a three-day event at the University of Houston that takes place on campus every spring semester, usually in the last weekend of March to the first weekend in April. Student groups perform a variety of shows, host carnival booths and put on multicultural performances, participate in a large cook-off competition, and free concerts from well-known performers.

Money raised from Frontier Fiesta goes to ten scholarships offered to incoming freshmen. At its peak from 1946 through 1959, the Frontier Fiesta received national attention by drawing huge crowds of up to 200,000 people and was profiled in Life magazine.

As of 2025, Frontier Fiesta is still an active "student–run, student–led festival hosted by the University of Houston to promote scholarship, community, and education in the University of Houston students, staff, and faculty, as well as in the Houston community." Frontier Fiesta exhibits talents of the University of Houston student body. "Each year a piece of the University of Houston campus is transformed into a fully functional town called 'Fiesta City.' Frontier Fiesta features free live concerts each night, variety shows by student organizations, carnival booths, multicultural performances, and a BBQ Cook–Off and Bake Fiesta."

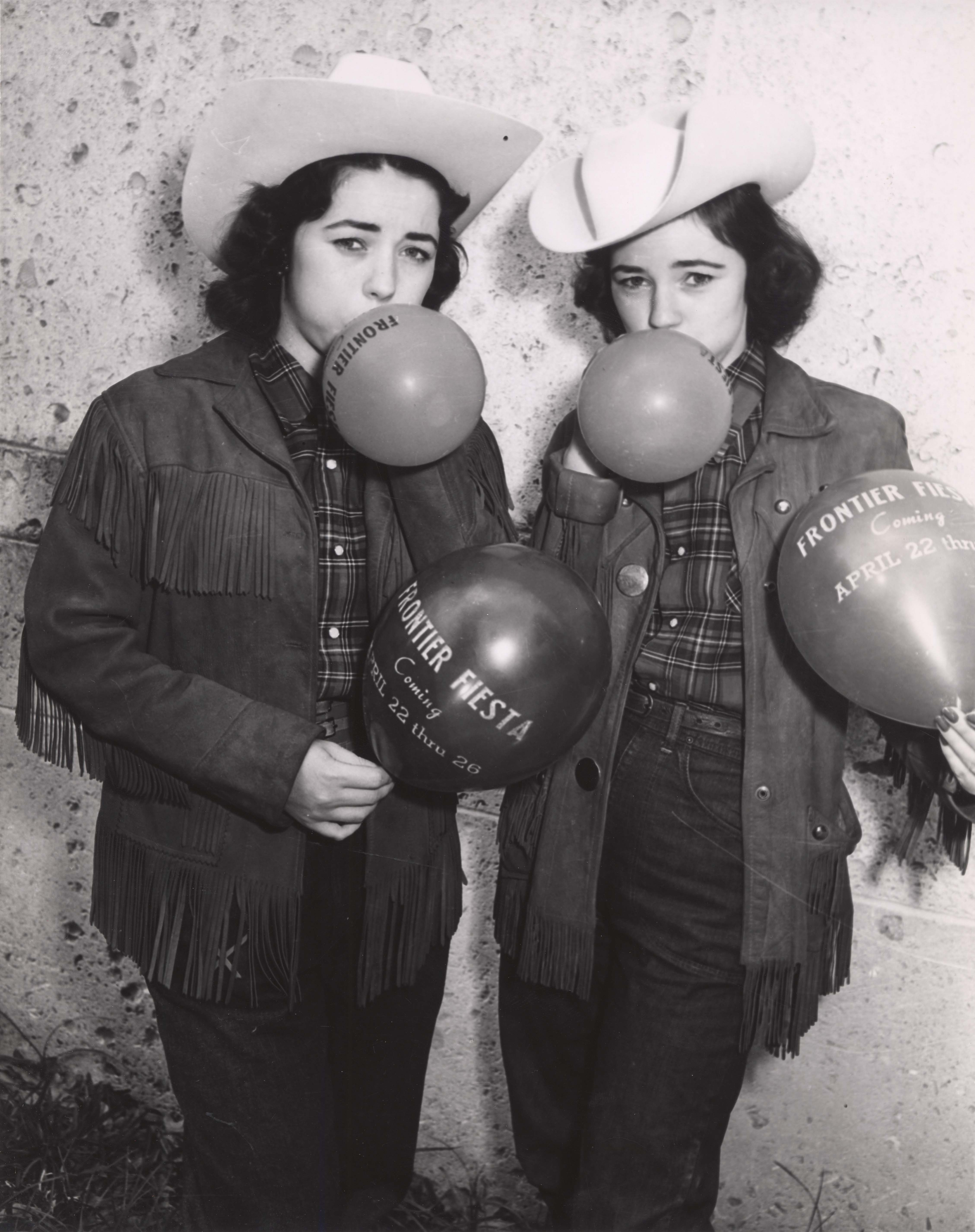
Balloons Depicting Frontier Fiesta April 22–26 in the 1950s

== History ==
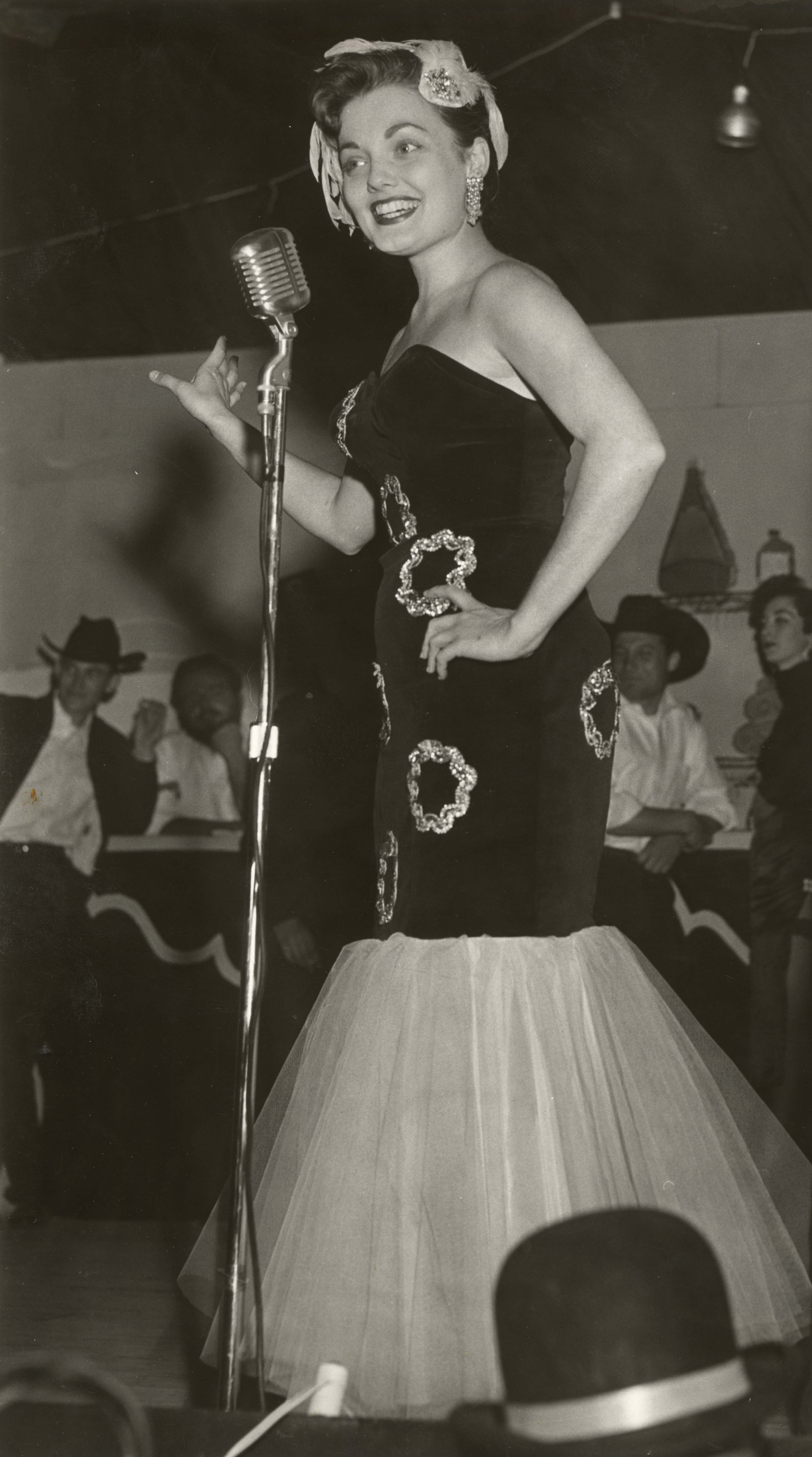
Jenna Coy Huddleston at the Tombstone Theater, one of the "Top Acts" during Frontier Fiesta 1956

In 1940, a group of students started a tradition known as Frontier Fiesta. This annual event had variety shows performed by students and concerts and was intended to bring together University of Houston students and the Houston community. The tradition grew tremendously over the next few years and became hugely popular, and Houston mayors often declared "Fiesta City" as an official "town" for the week. Hollywood stars such as Humphrey Bogart, James Garner, Anne Baxter, Kenny Rogers, and Patsy Swayze were attracted to the annual event. Life magazine once dubbed it, "The Greatest College Show on Earth". It also drew attention for only accepting Confederate money.

The annual tradition became too large and involved as the event was having a considerable impact academically for the students involved. Due to this, Frontier Fiesta was discontinued after the Frontier Fiesta of 1959.

In 1992, a group of students worked to bring back the tradition of Frontier Fiesta, and to this day it is again an annual tradition at the University of Houston. The Frontier Fiesta Association is the student-led group that plans and runs the event. However, the university's staging of the event has been criticized by various groups.

The COVID-19 pandemic caused officials to scrap the 2020 event and defer to 2021.

== Variety Shows ==
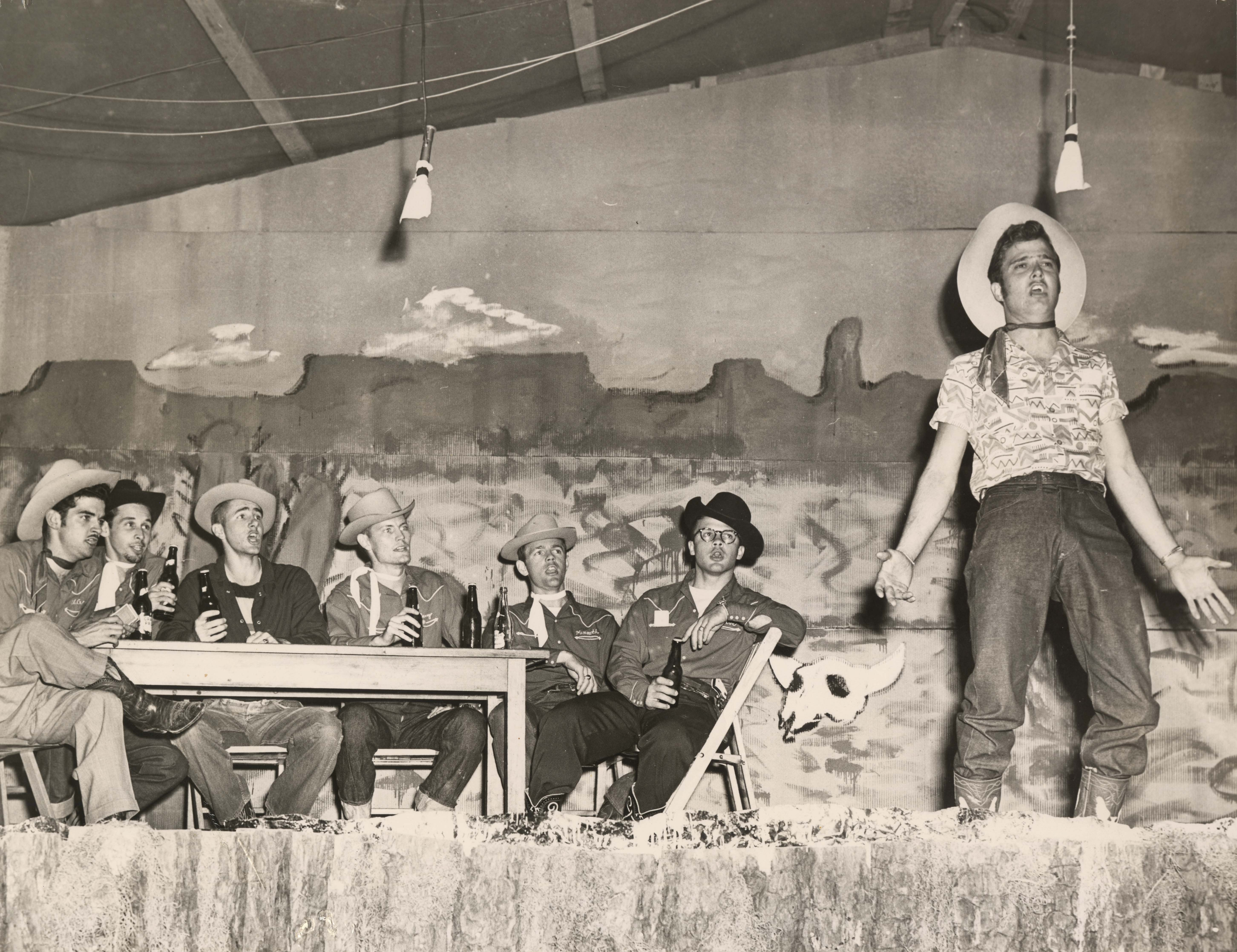
Student performs on stage at Frontier Fiesta in the 1950s

One of the main features of Frontier Fiesta are the variety shows. These shows, hosted by student groups, are 30 minute long shows that include singing and dancing. These shows are judged in an individual competition as groups compete for the coveted Joe Koppel Award (named for the second chairman of Frontier Fiesta in 1941), which is awarded to the best overall show.

In addition to the show itself, the student groups construct elaborate "fronts" which act as an entrance to their tent for the performance. The fronts line the main midway of Frontier Fiesta, effectively becoming "Fiesta City". They are usually constructed in a theme to match that of the show. For example, an Old West jailhouse may be the front for a show that centers around a jailbreak.

Frontier Fiesta was originally Western themed and most of the fronts and shows were done in an Old West style (country music and dancing were the norm). As the years have gone by and as the student groups participating in the event have become more diverse, Frontier Fiesta has deviated from its Old West heritage and become more current.

== Cook off ==
After shows, student groups, alumni groups and other cook off teams host various cook off sites, where their patrons can enjoy the remainder of the evening eating, drinking and listening to music at their tent. These sites are usually privately run and an invitation or an entry fee is required for participation. Individual schools also host cook off sites for students and alumni, such as the Bauer College of Business and the Architecture School.

Frontier Fiesta boasts a "world class cook off" where several cook off teams compete in five food categories: Chicken, Ribs, Brisket, Beans and Fajitas. In addition, a baking contest is held where cookies and other desserts can compete for awards. A cash prize is awarded for the winners in the brisket category.

== Concerts ==
After the revival of Frontier Fiesta in 1992, free concerts were added to cap off each night at Frontier Fiesta. Popular entertainers such as Jerry Jeff Walker, Doug Supernaw, Robert Earl Keen, Cory Morrow, and Roger Creager have been known to grace the stage.

Each year the Fiesta Committee is given a significant budget and asked to bring in talent that will be widely accepted and well liked. In past years, Tejano bands such as Los Palominos, hip-hop entertainers such as T.I., The Clipse, and alternative rock bands such as Cobra Starship, along with some lesser known bands and have been a part of the Fiesta tradition.

In 2014, performers included B.o.B, A Great Big World, and Love and Theft.

== Other Events ==
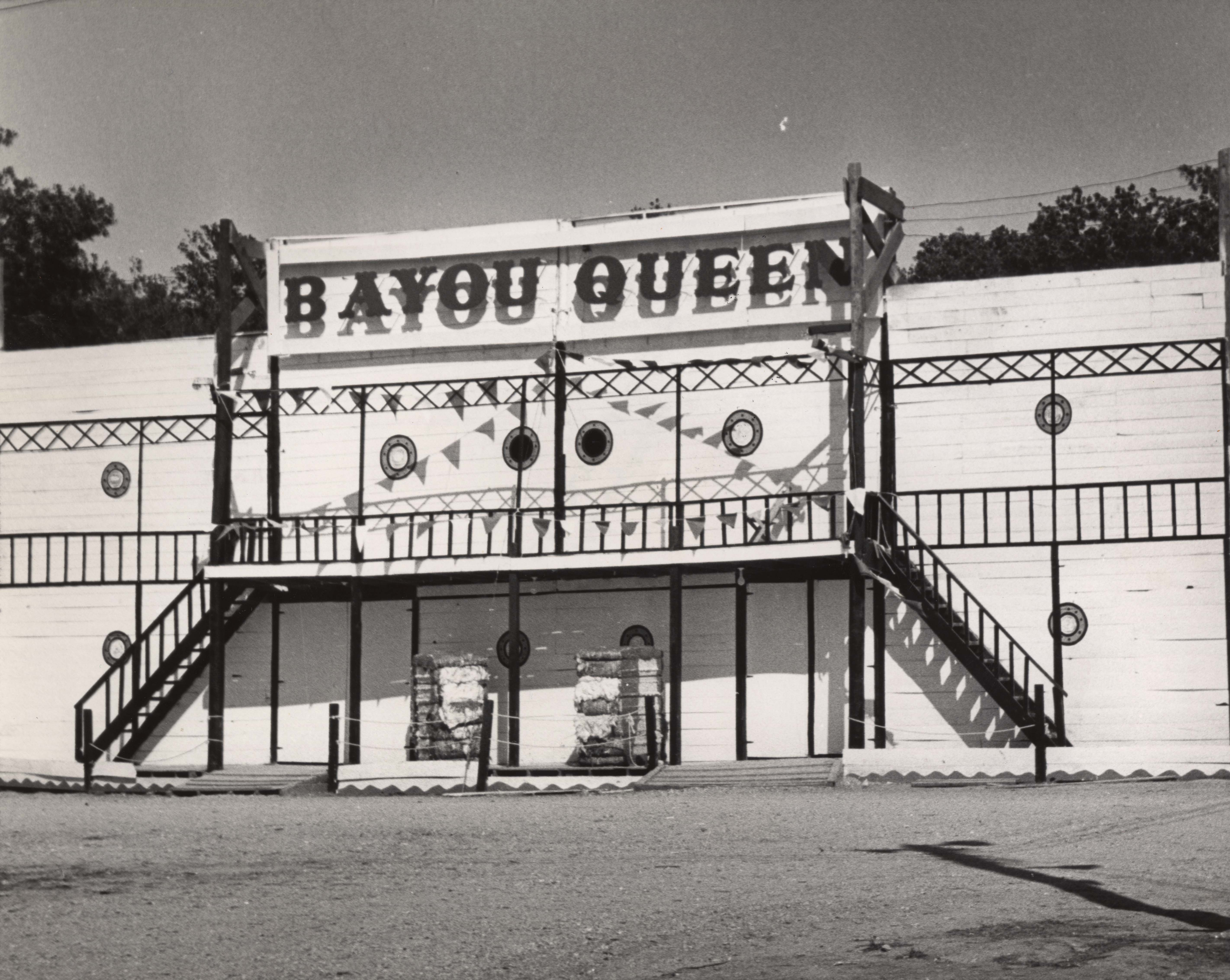
Bayou Queen booth, 1950s

In addition to the main events, Frontier Fiesta is a place where students, alumni and community members can come and enjoy carnival rides, carnival games (some hosted by student groups), a silent auction and exhibits.

Saturday afternoons usually have a "family day" scheduled where parents can bring their children for special events, demonstrations and a petting zoo.

- Beard-growing Contest
- Annie Oakley Contest
- Date Auction
- Silent Auction
- Little Wrangler Day

== Scholarships ==
A focus of Frontier Fiesta is to raise money for scholarships. The Frontier Fiesta Association awards ten scholarships to incoming freshmen based on academics and community service. As of 2008, Frontier Fiesta has awarded over $70,000 in scholarships. In 2008, Frontier Fiesta granted $10,000 to UH students.

In addition there are two students that are appointed "Mr." and "Miss" Frontier Fiesta for the subsequent year. Mr. and Miss Frontier Fiesta are the students that personally raised the greatest amount of money for student scholarships during the festival.

== Frontier Fiesta Gallery, 1950s ==
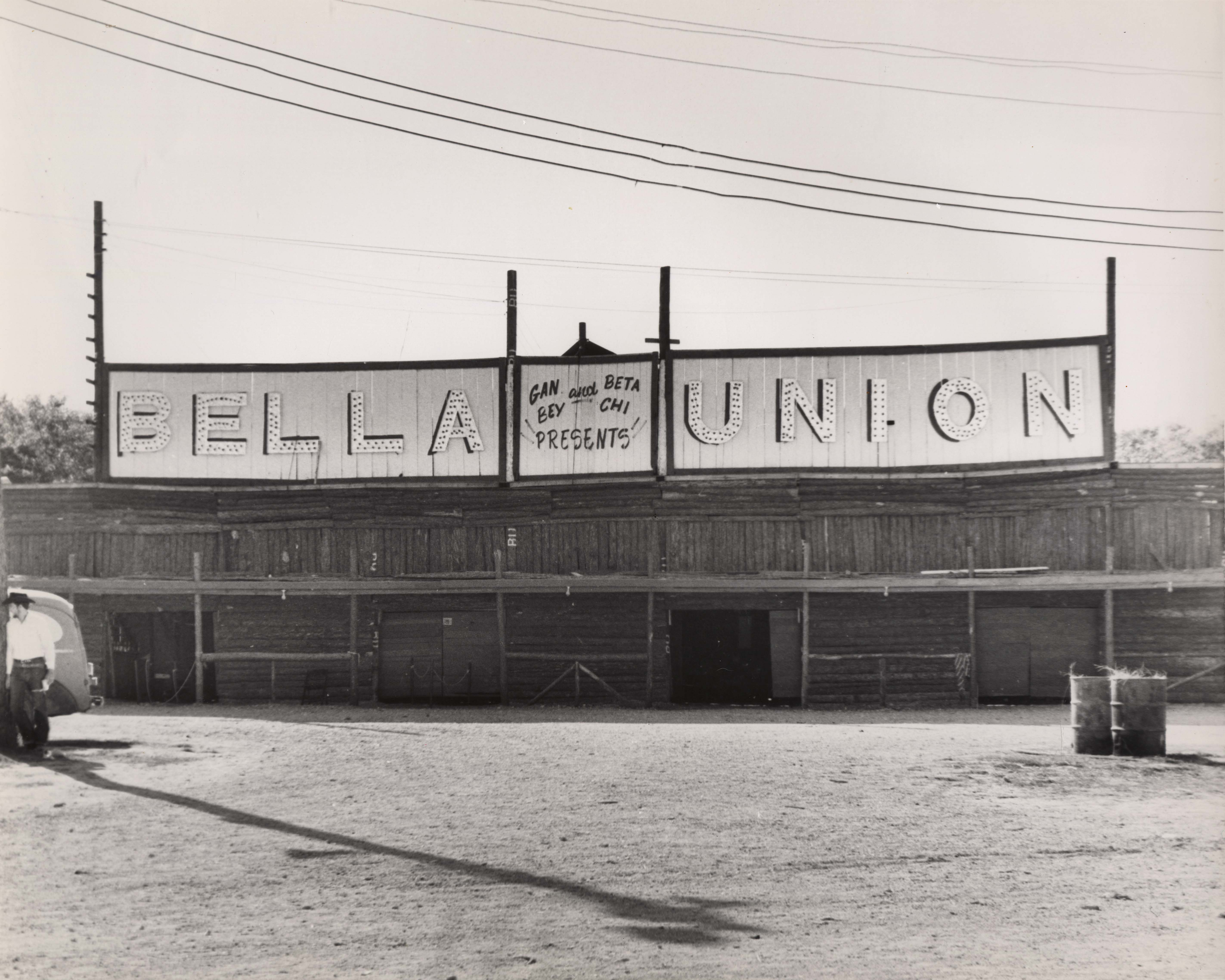
Bella Union

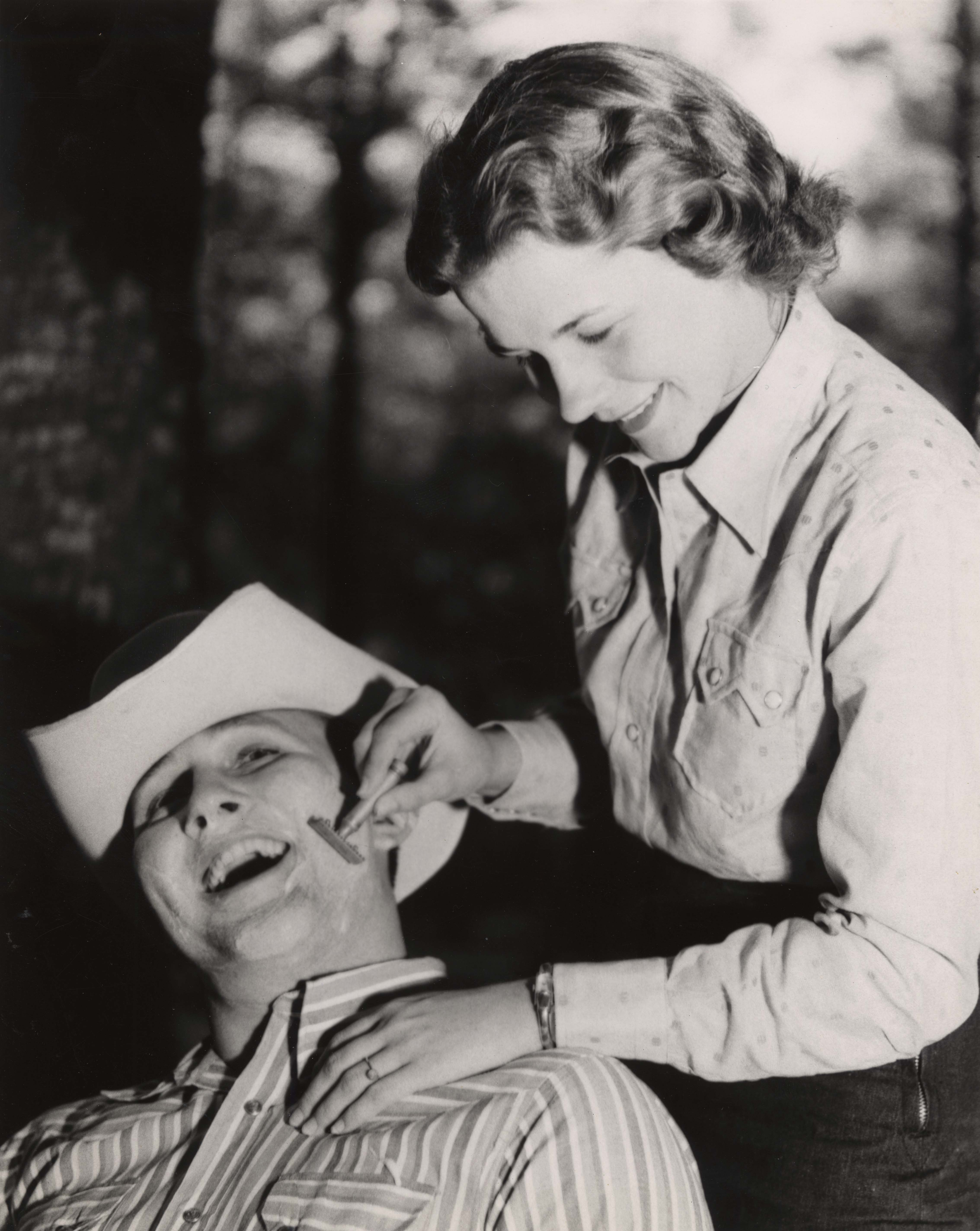
Clean Shaven, A student smiles as his beard removal is almost complete

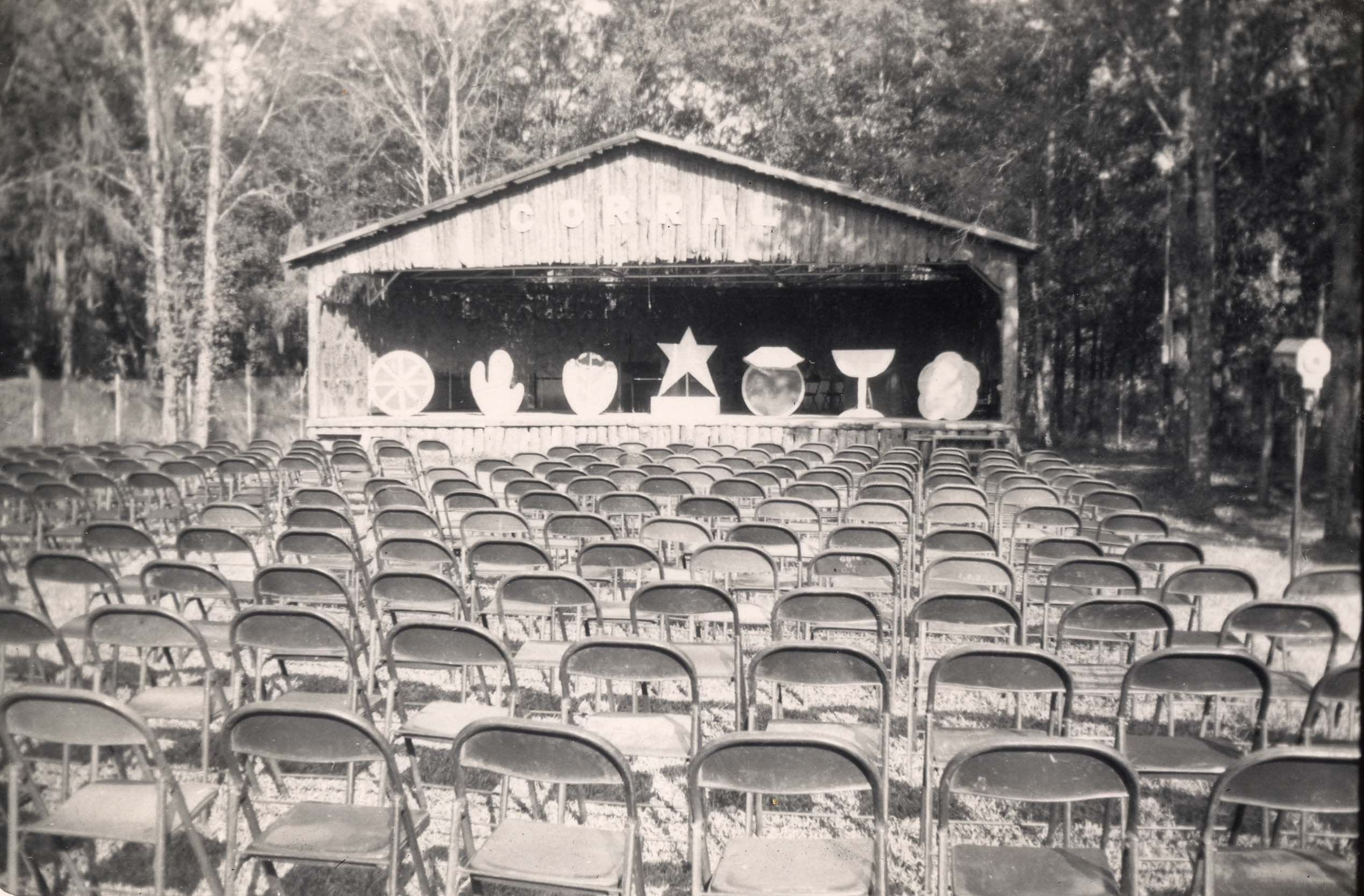
Corral stage

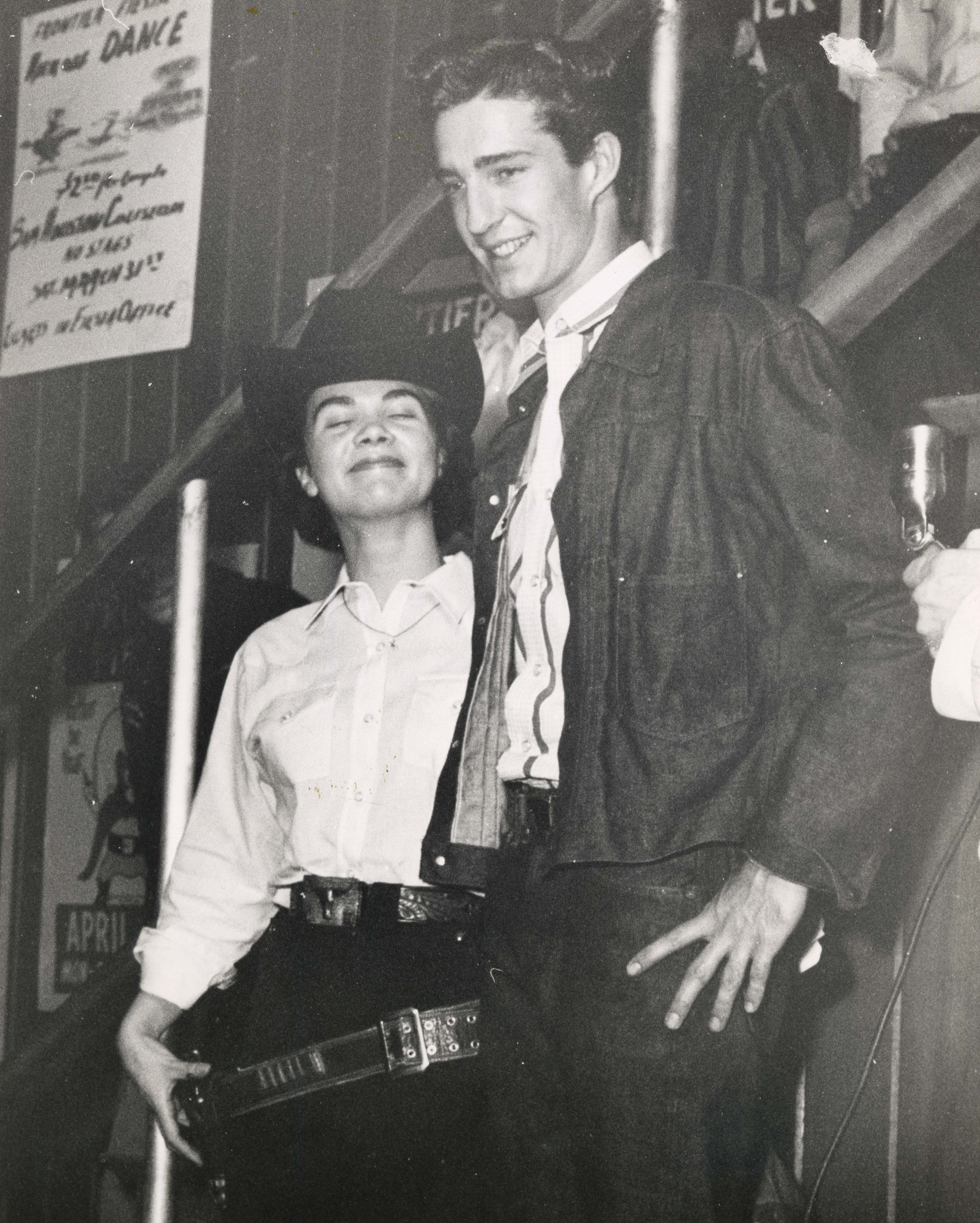
Couple in costume

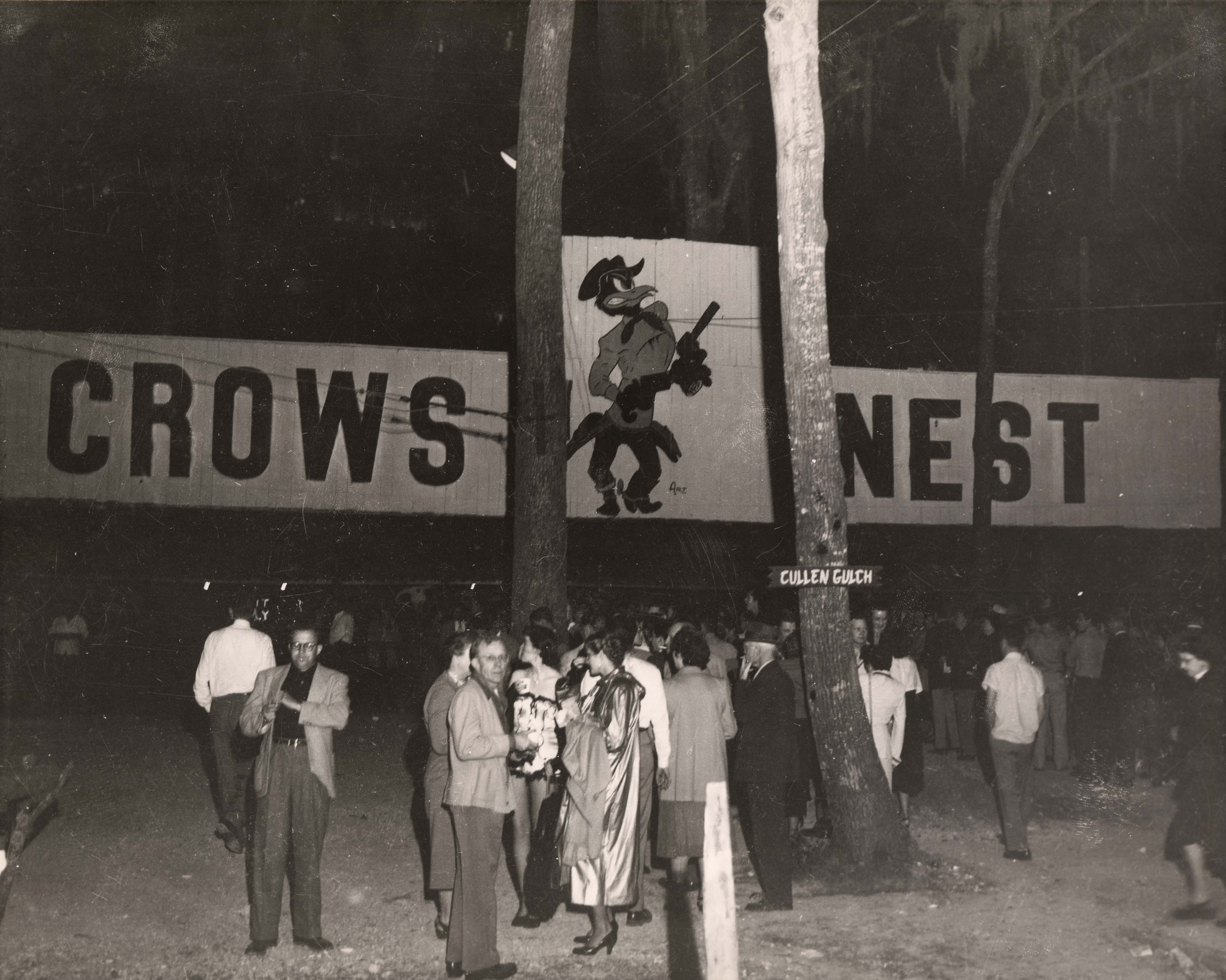
Crows Nest

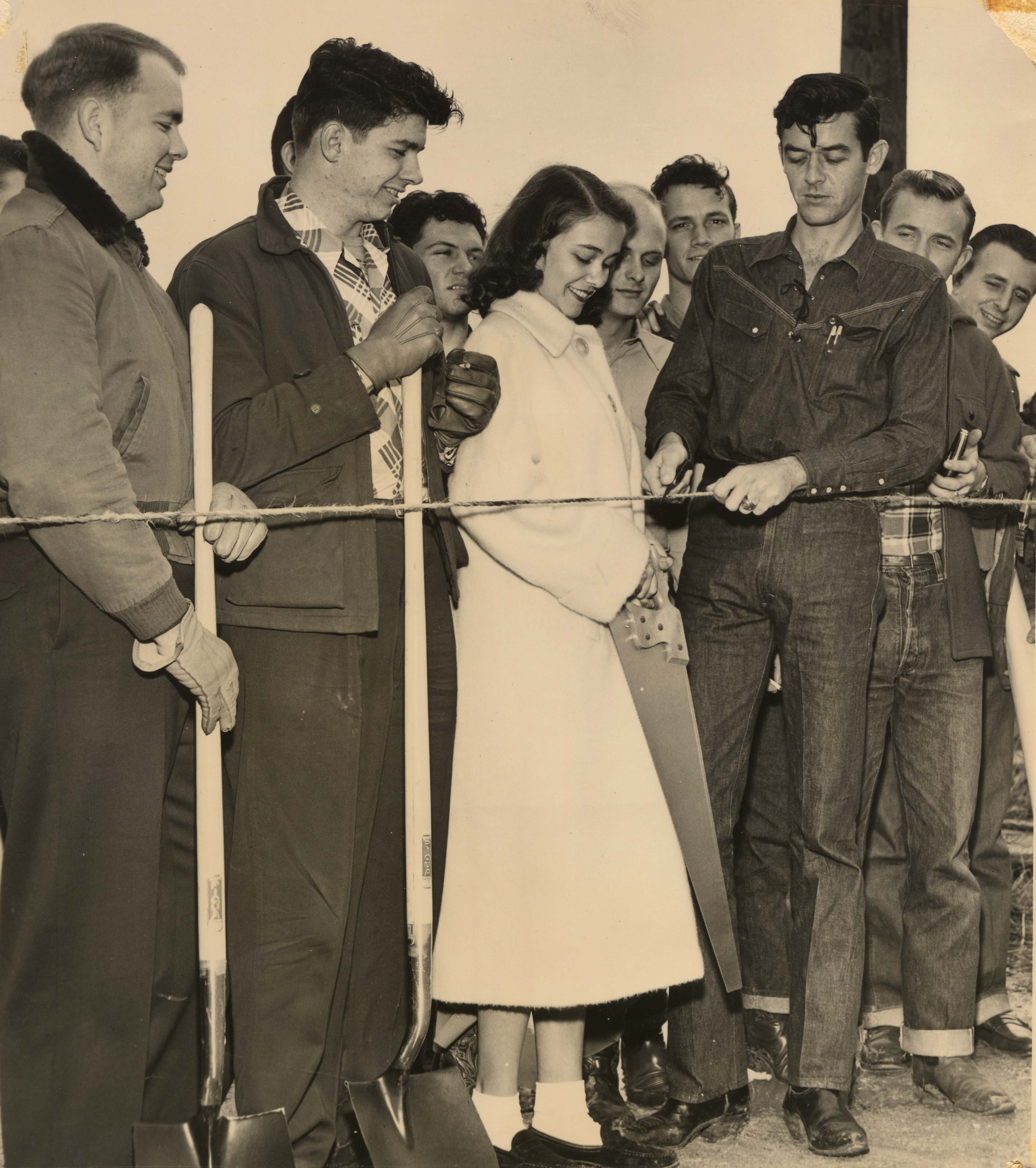
Cutting rope

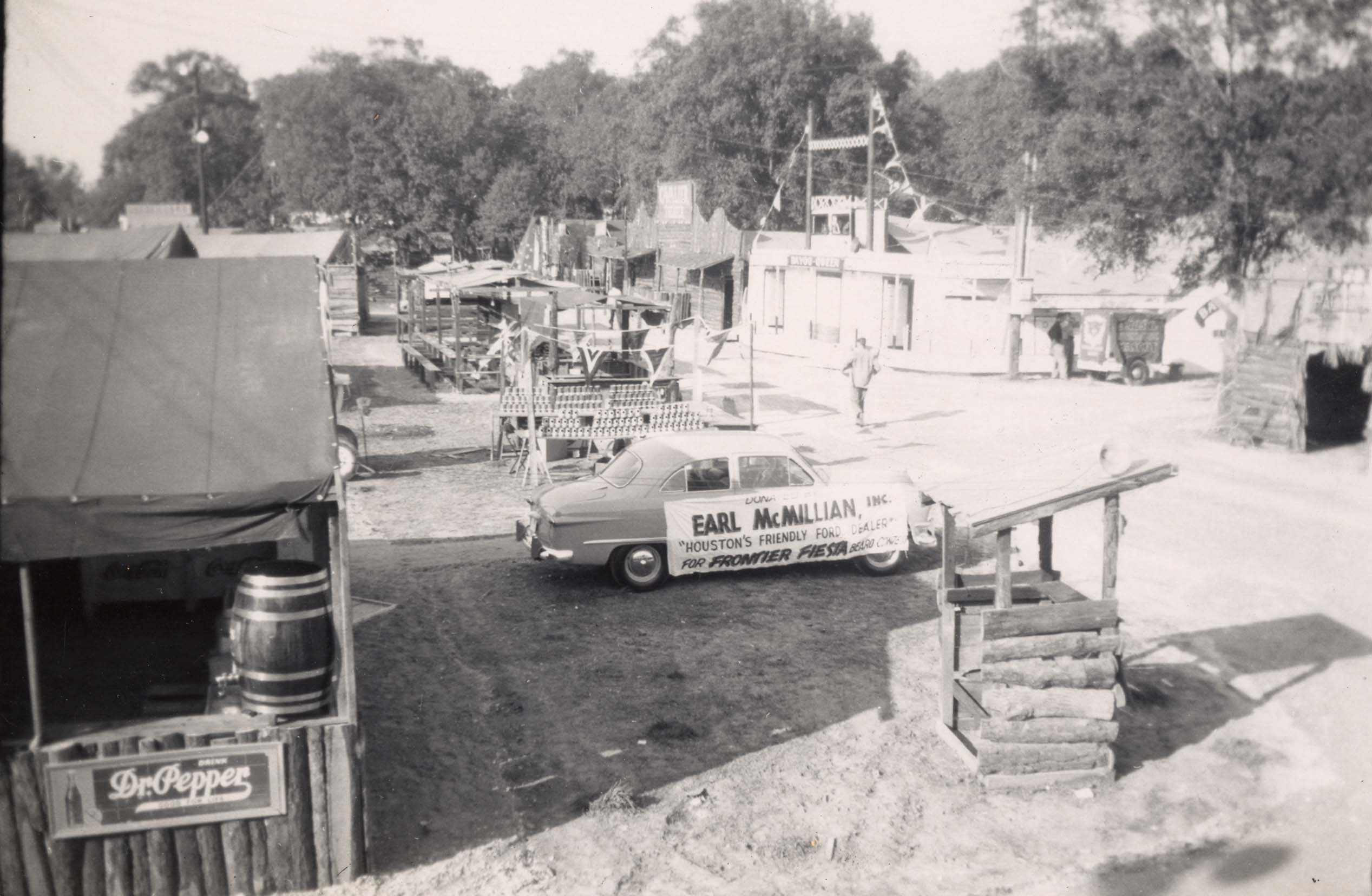
Earl McMillian, Inc. car

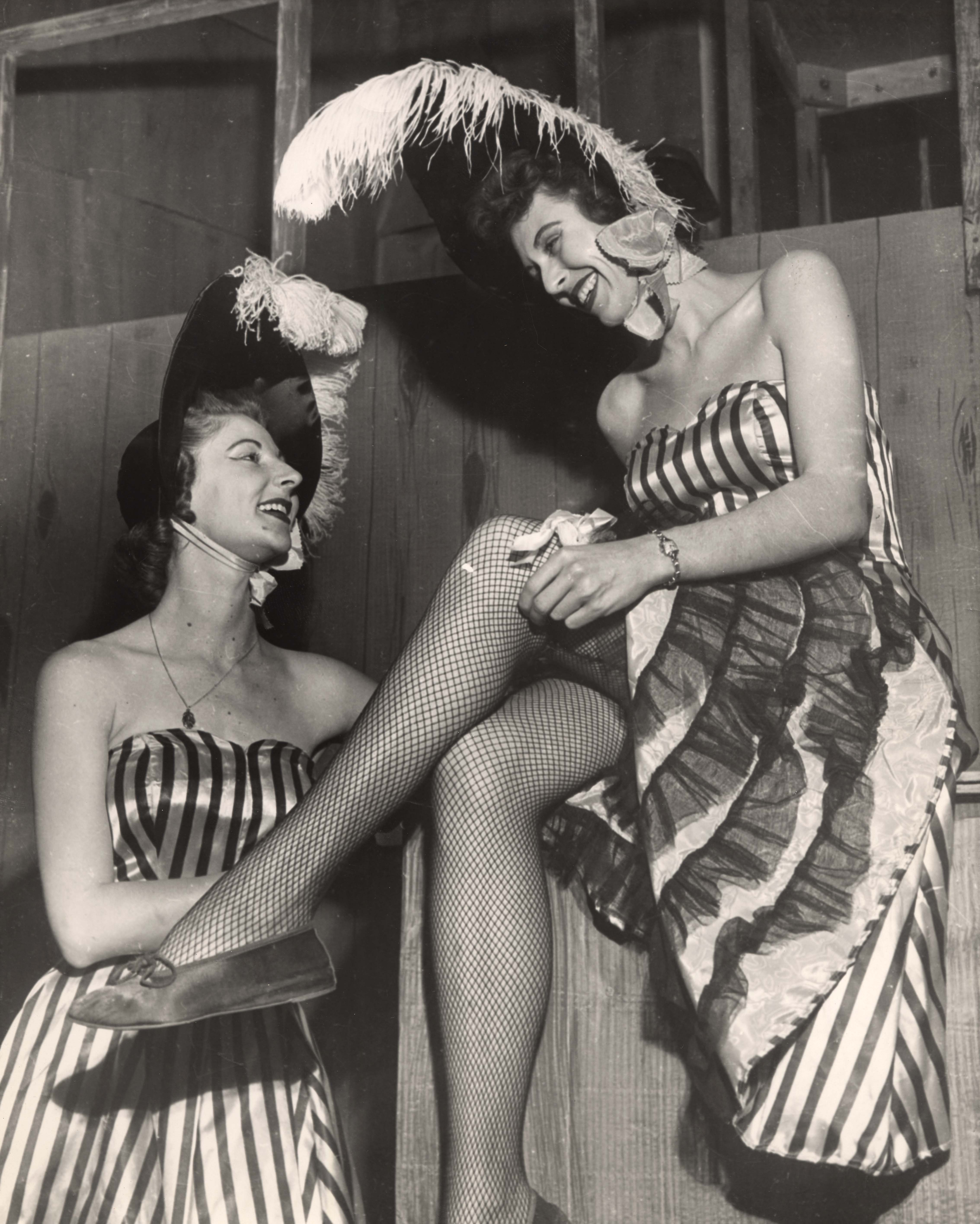
Fancy Dresses

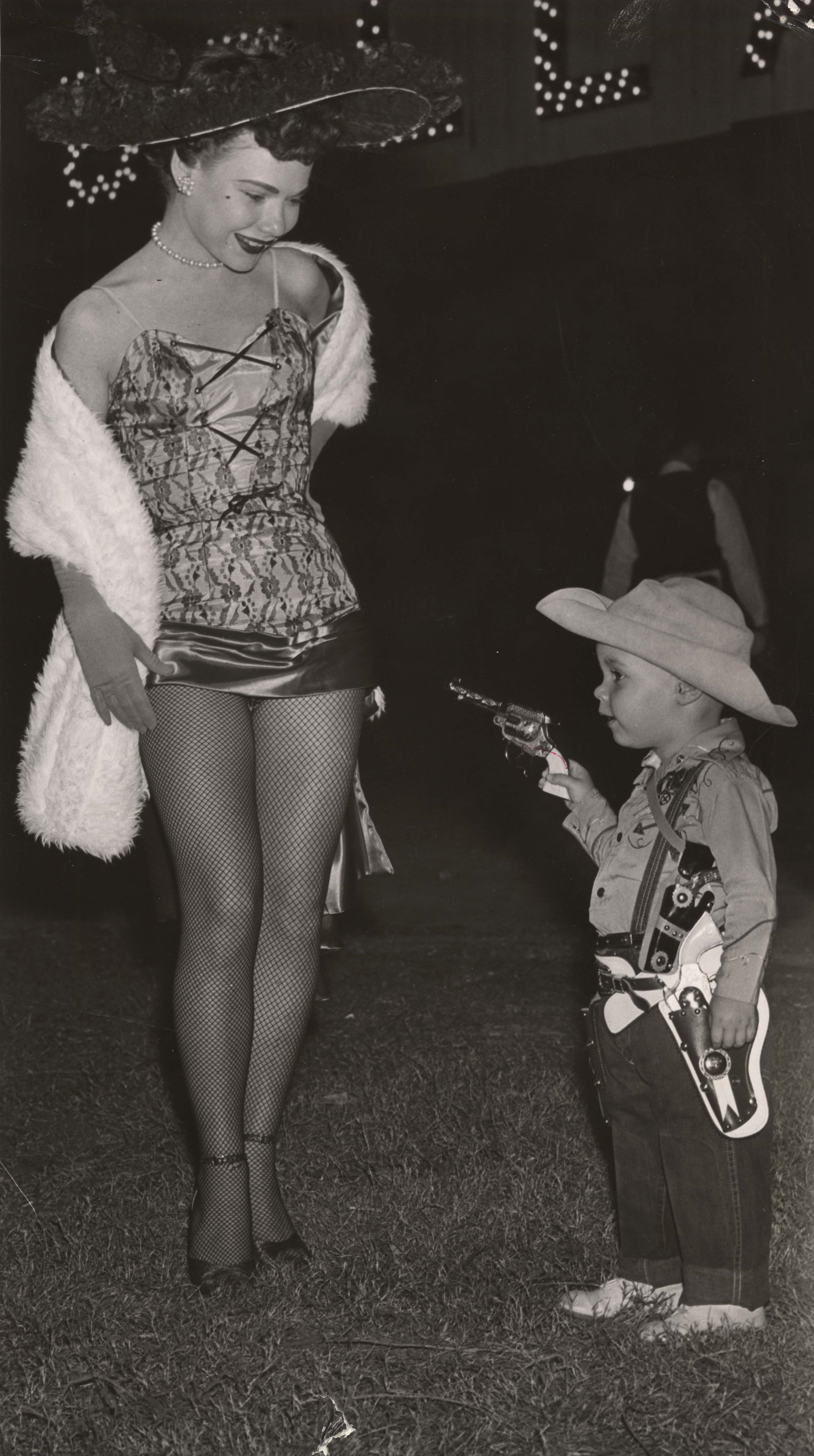
Female performer with boy

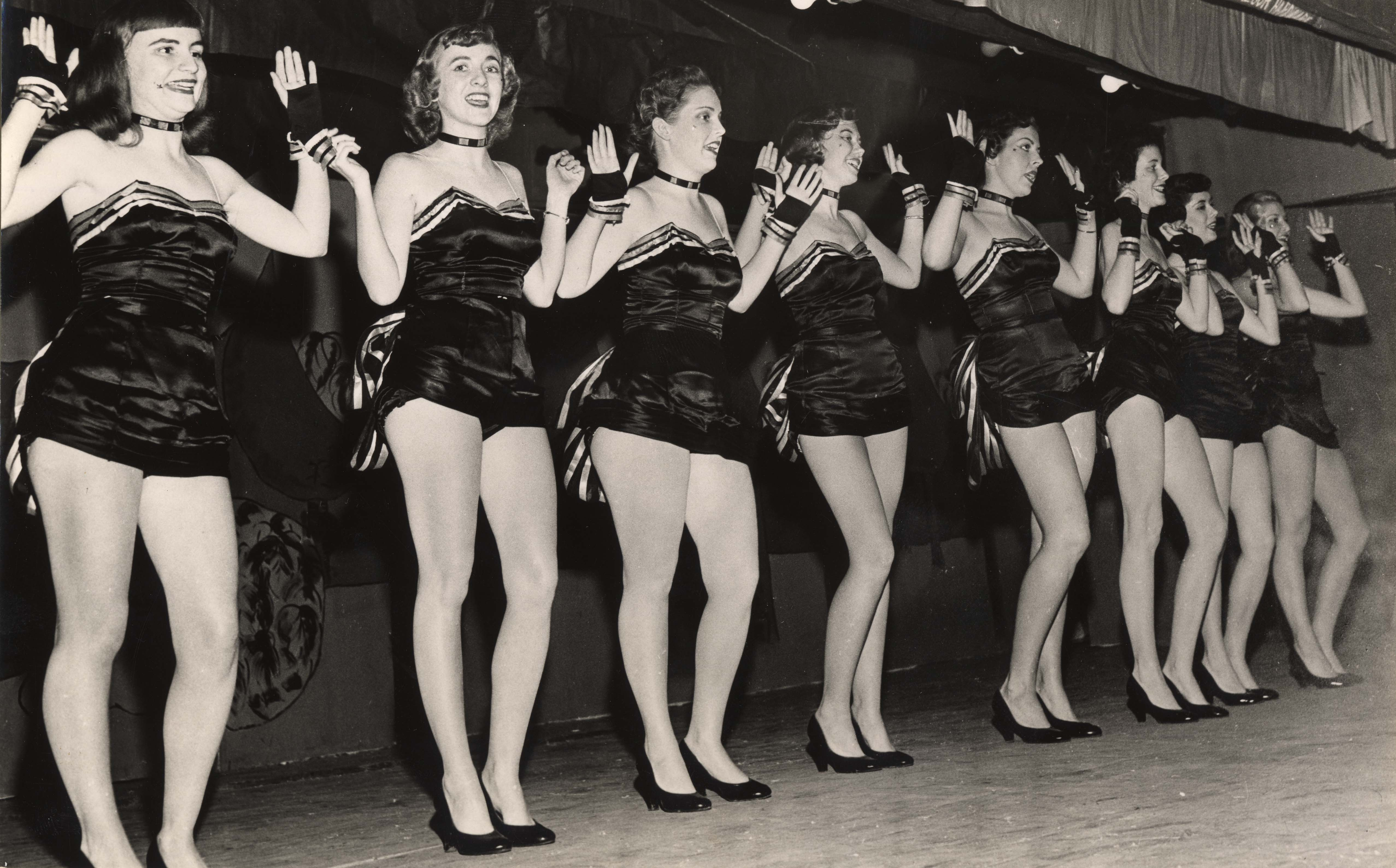
Female performers dancing

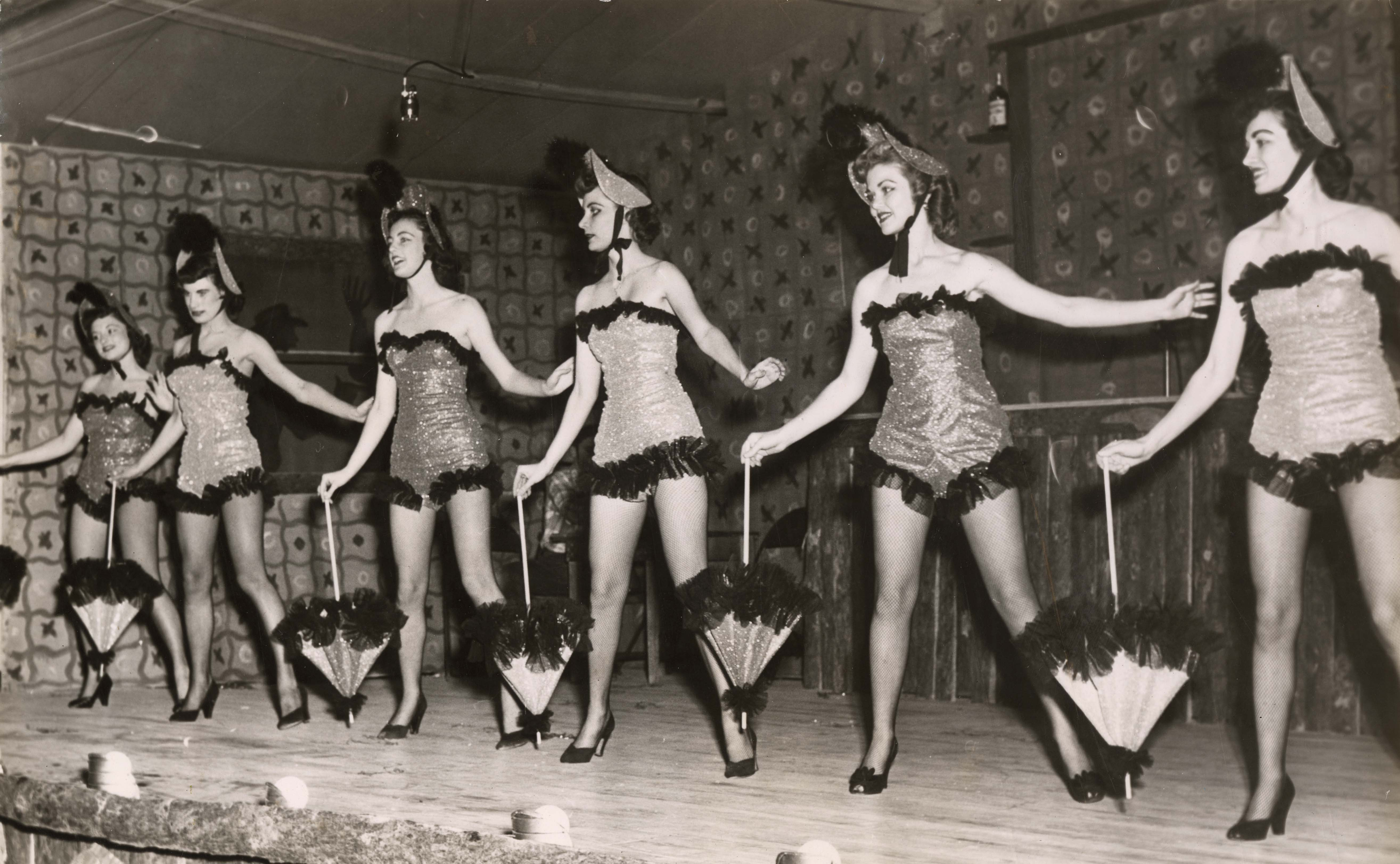
Female performers with parasols

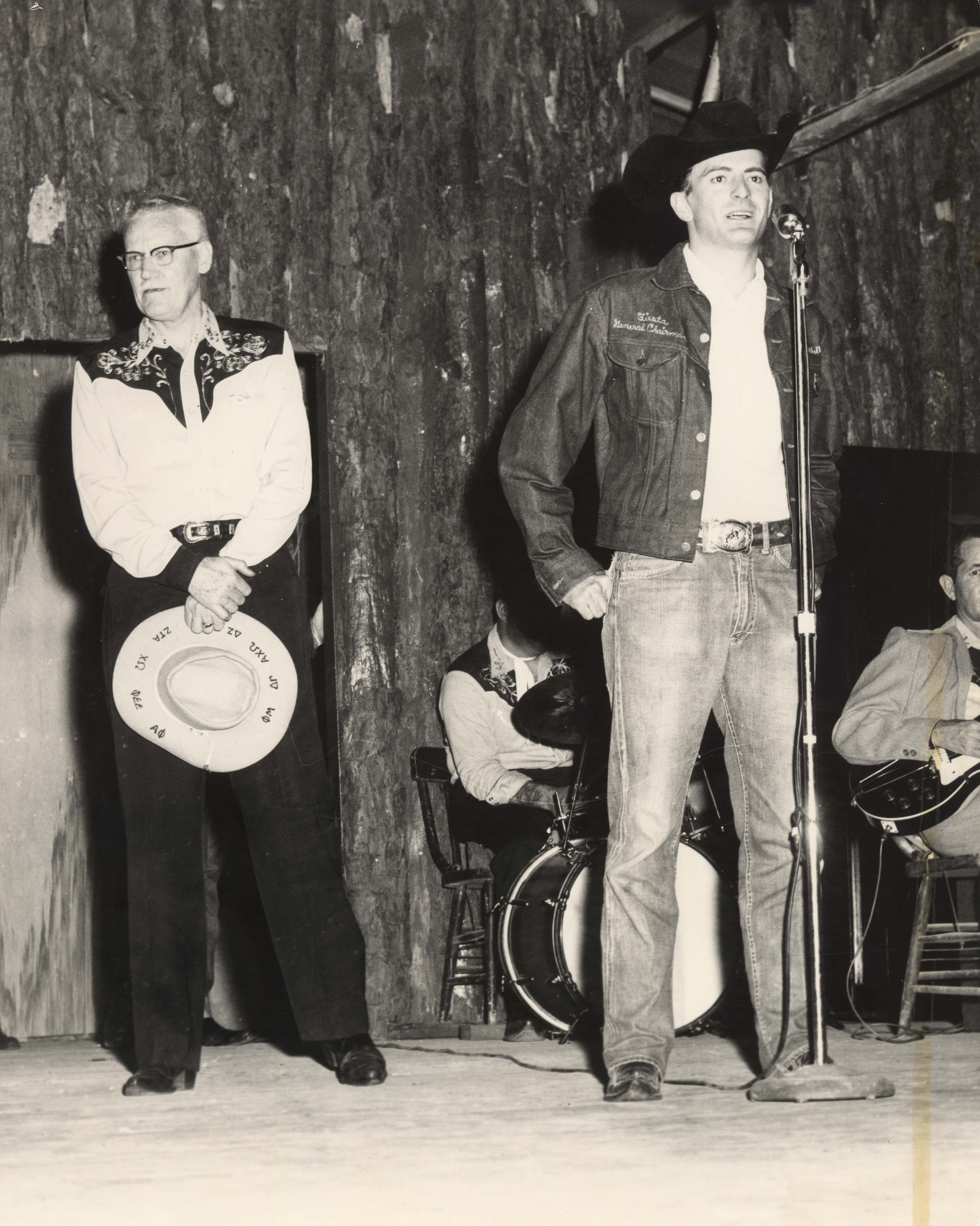
Fiesta General Chairman

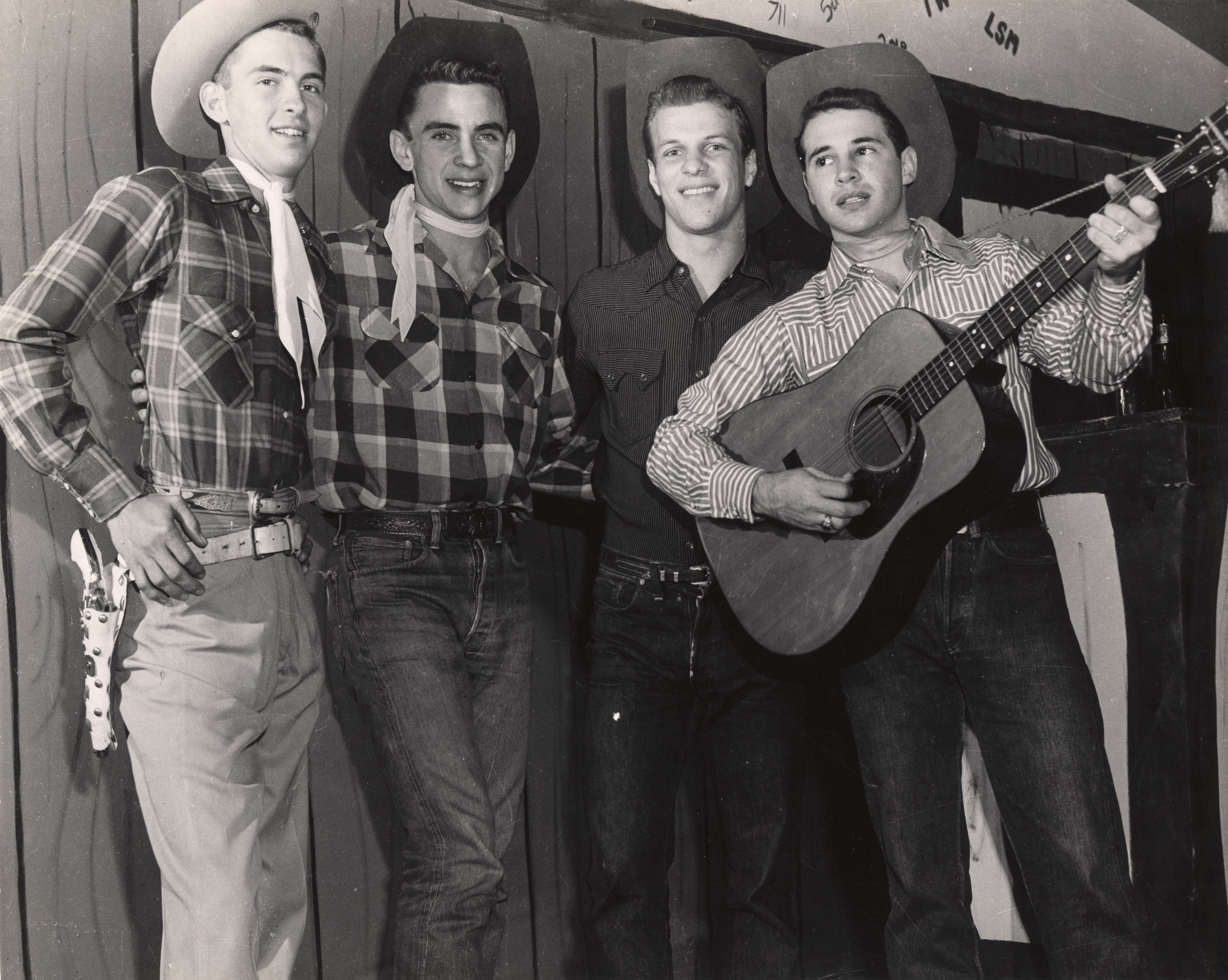
Four students with guitar, Four male students dressed as cowboys. The one on the right holds a guitar.

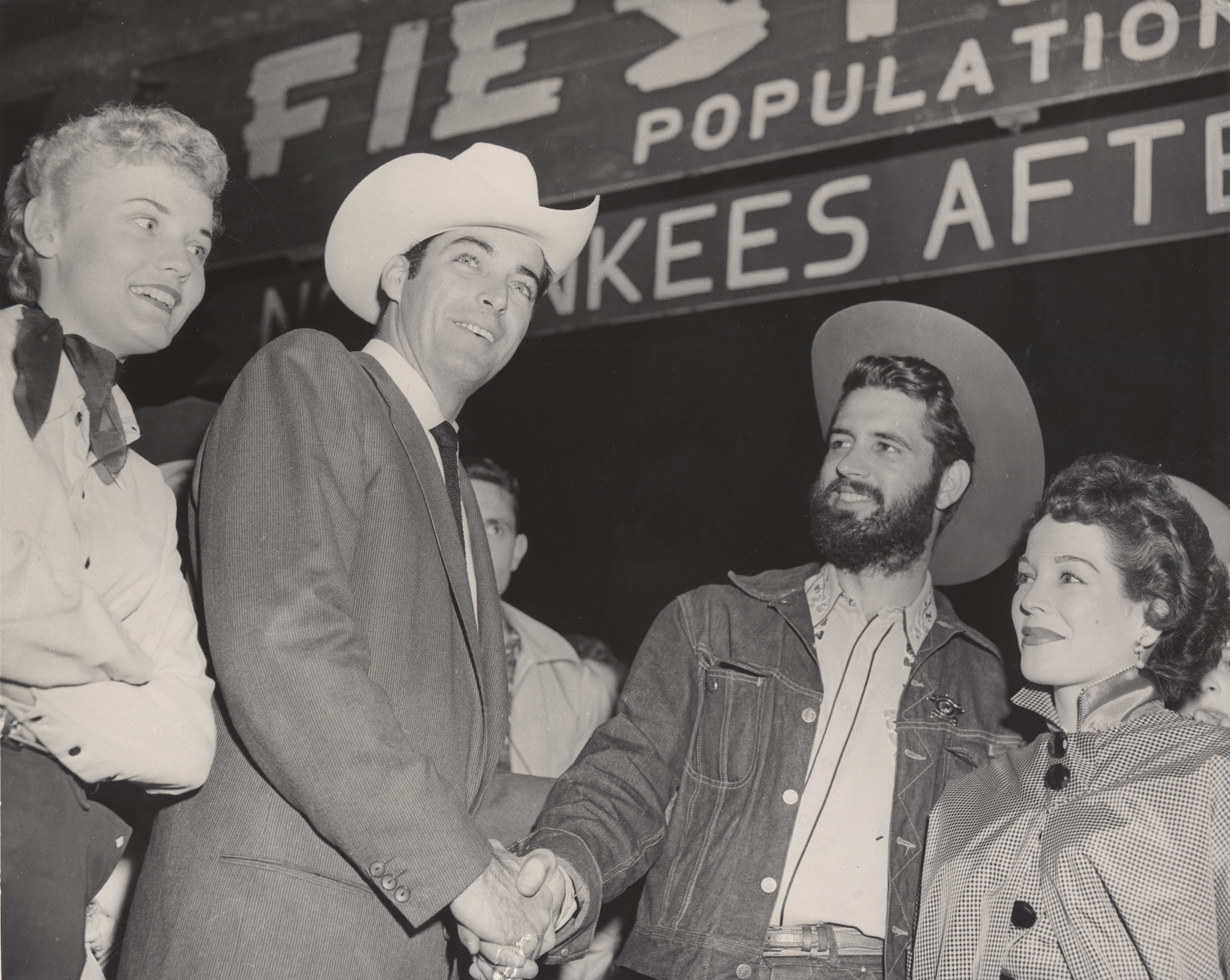
Handshake at Frontier Fiesta sign, Two students shake hands in front of a Frontier Fiesta sign.

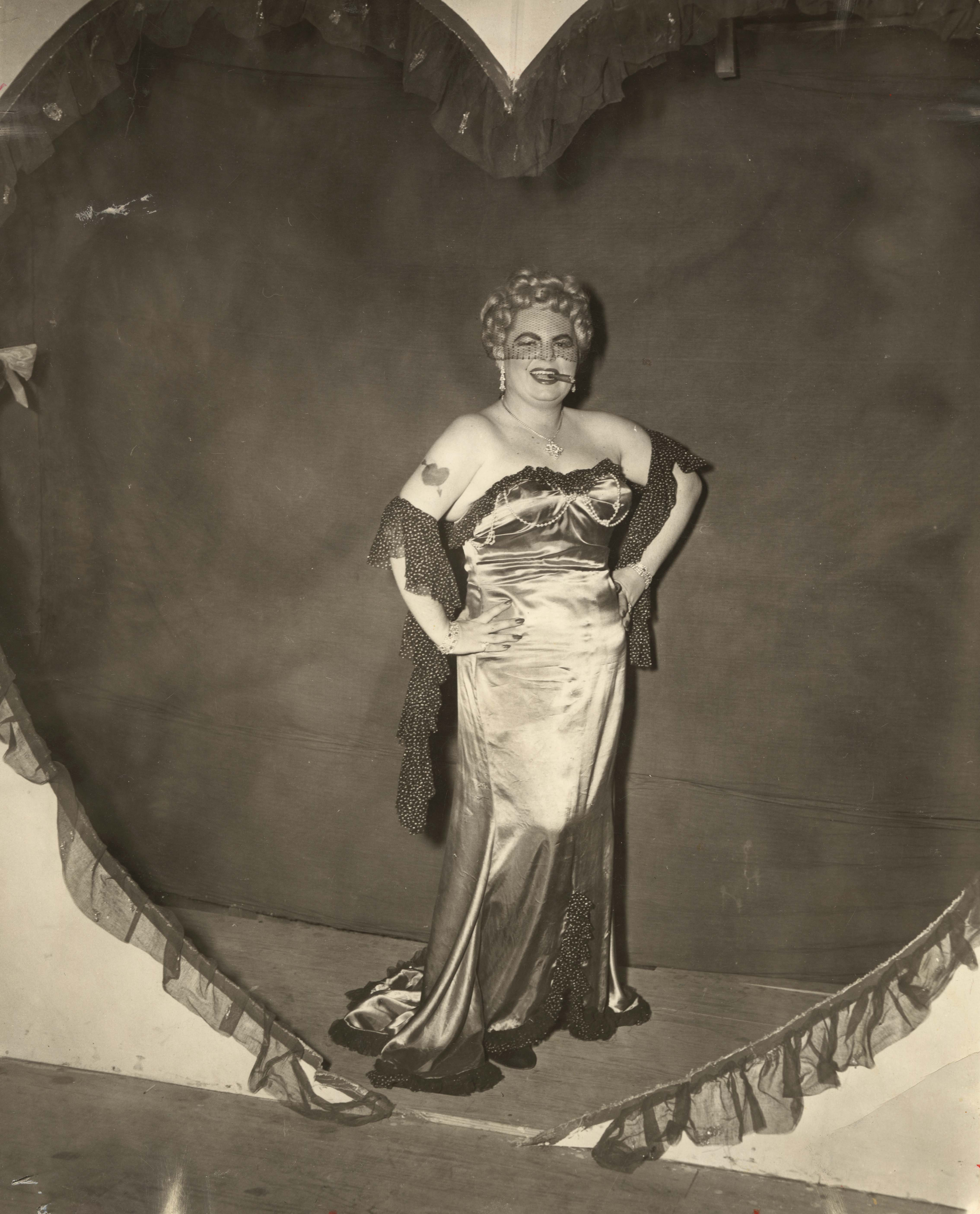
Heart-Shaped Doorway, Student in costume standing in a heart-shaped doorway at Frontier Fiesta.

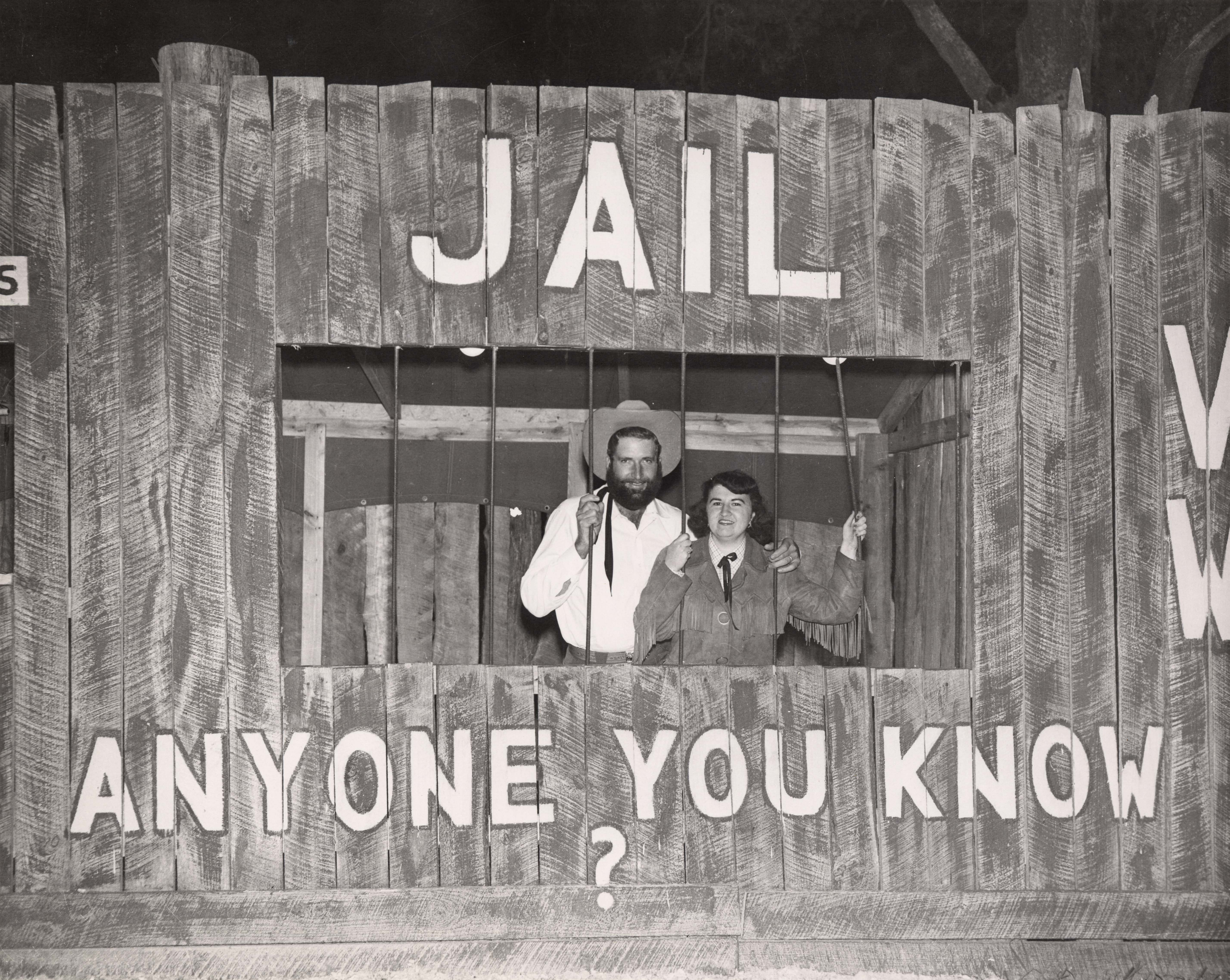
Jail, Students in a mock jail cell at Frontier Fiesta.

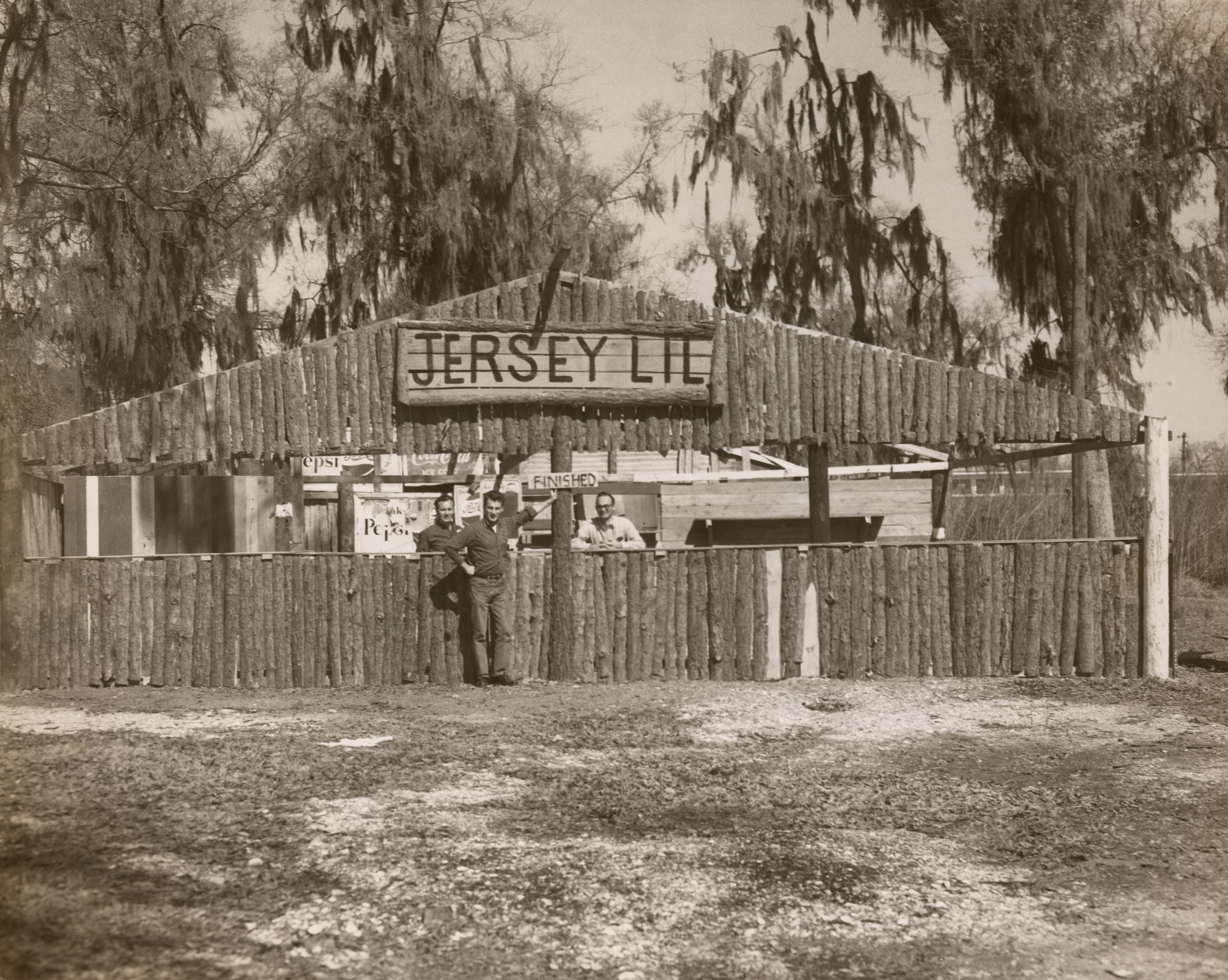
Jersey Lil, Booth named "Jersey Lil" at Frontier Fiesta.

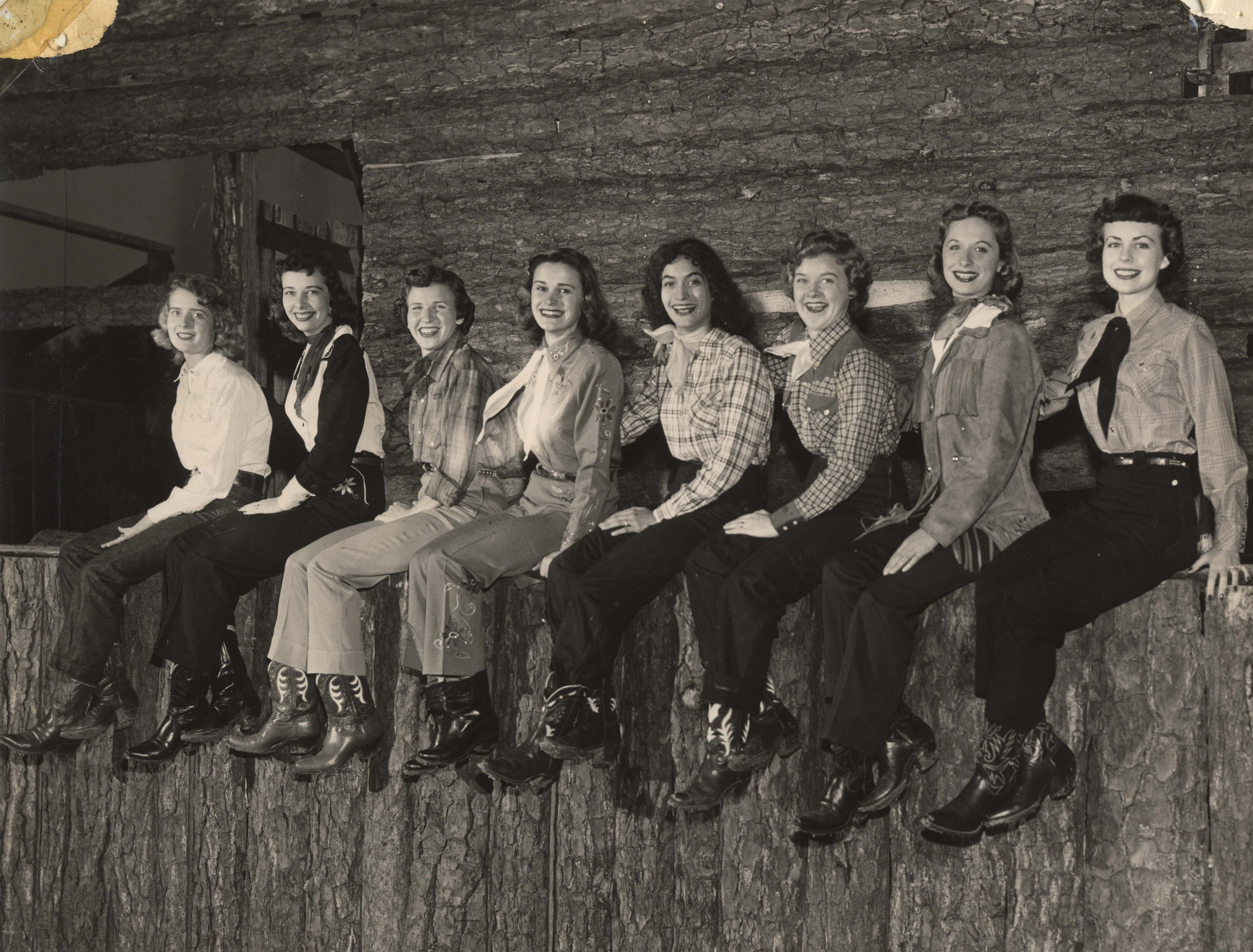
Lineup, Female students in western garb, sitting on a wall.

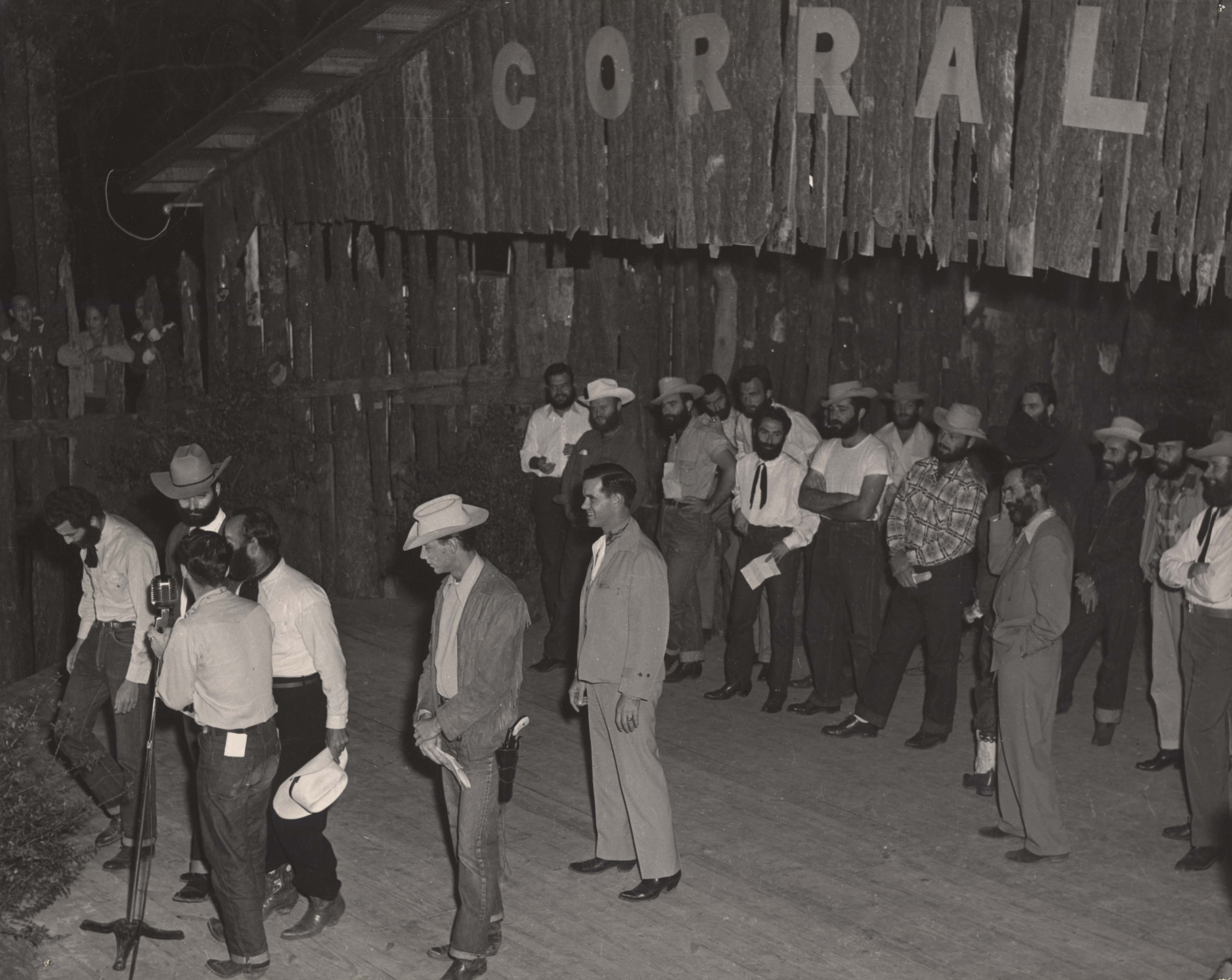
On stage at Corral, Male students on the Corral stage at Frontier Fiesta.

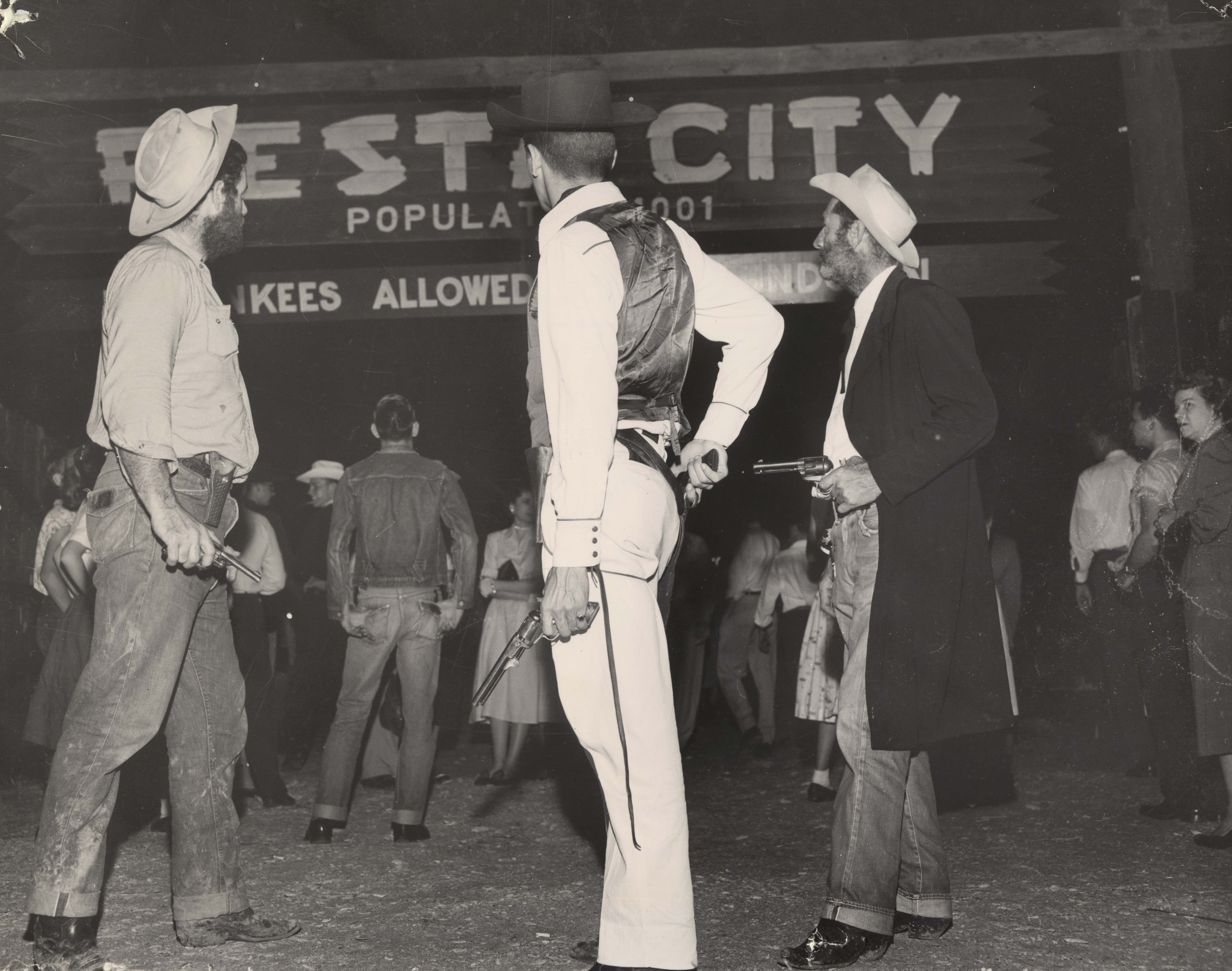
Outlaws at the Gate, Students dressed as outlaws near the Fiesta City gate.

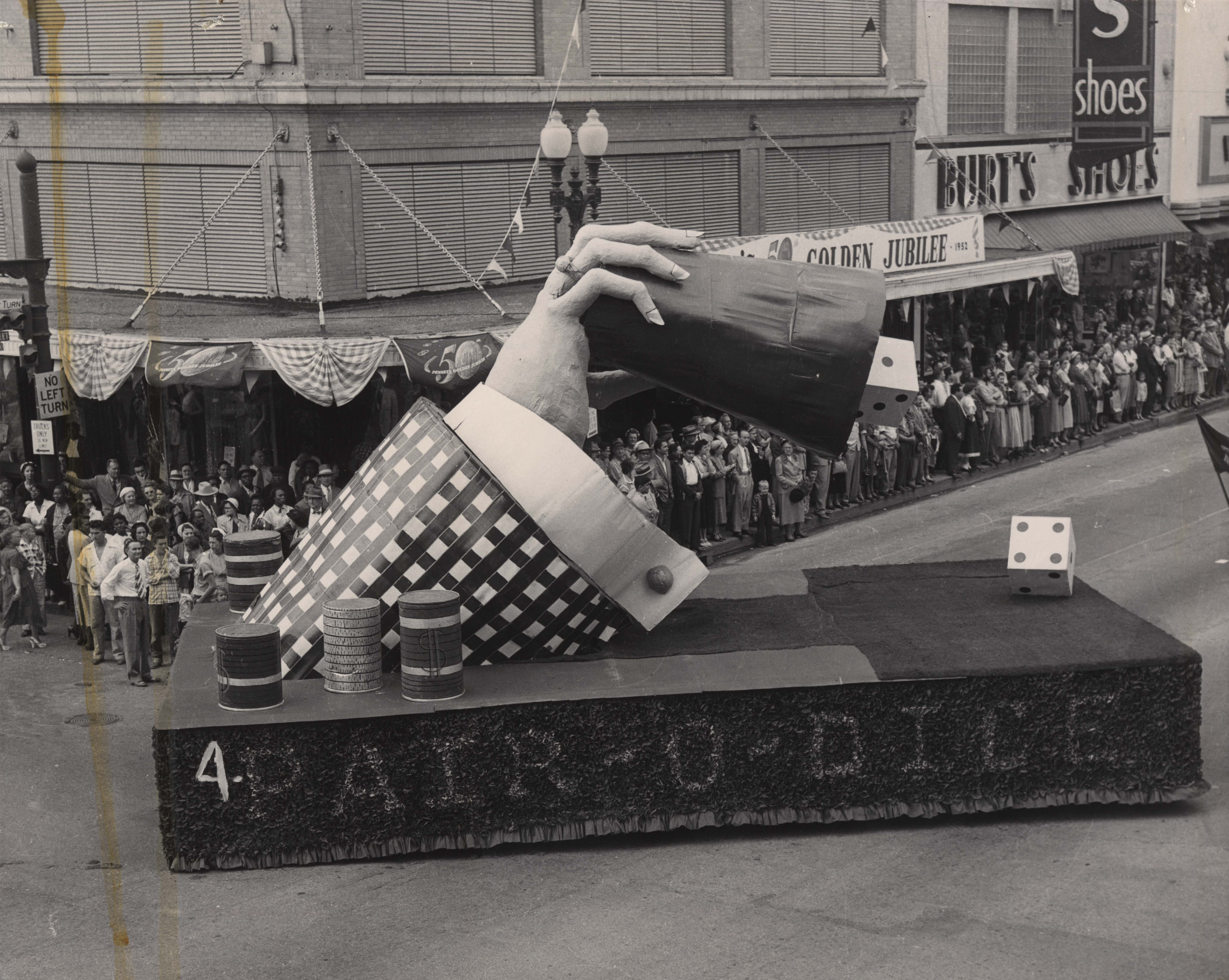
Pair-O-Dice float.

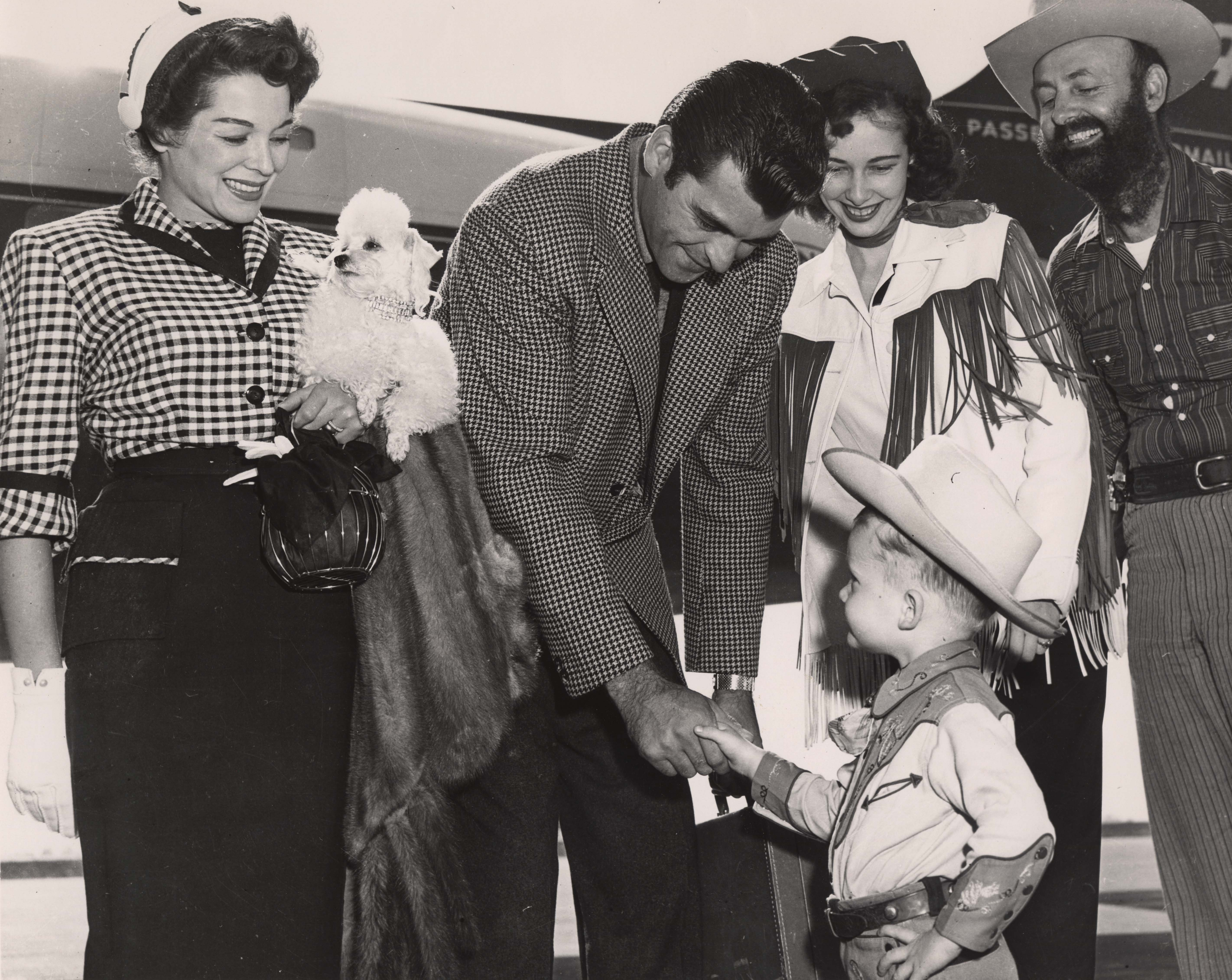
Shaking hands with a boy

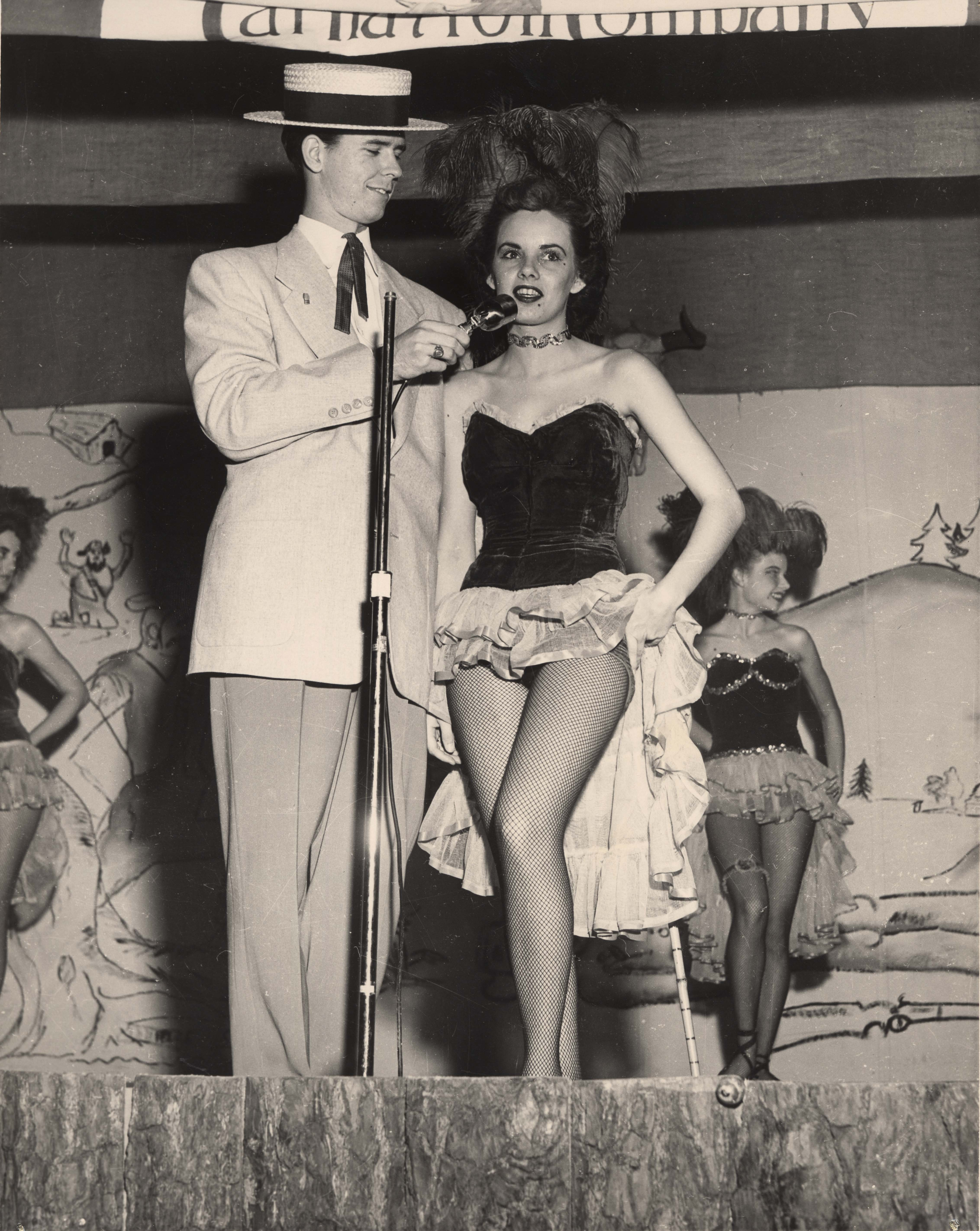
Sharing the Mic, Two performers share the microphone

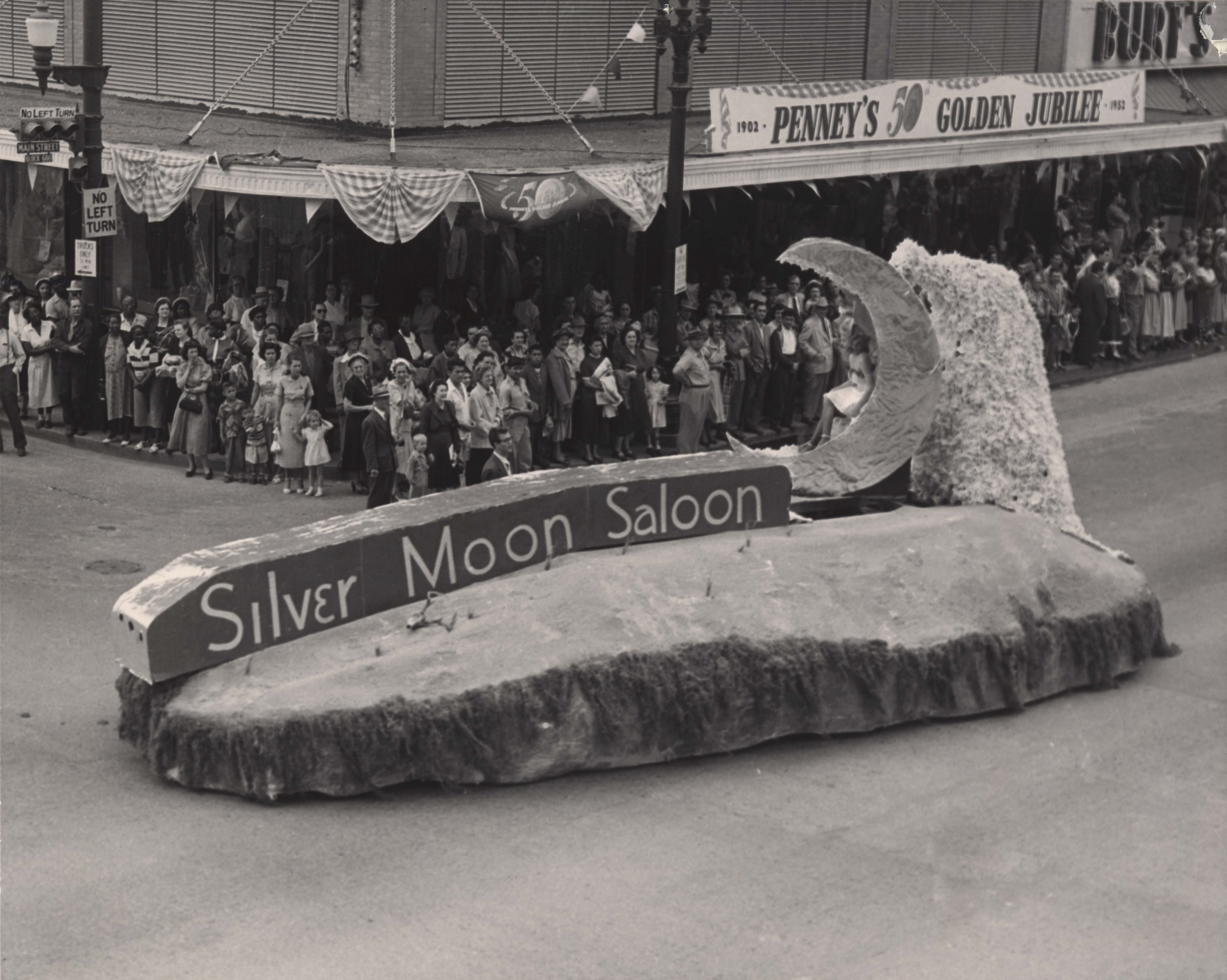
Silver Moon Saloon float

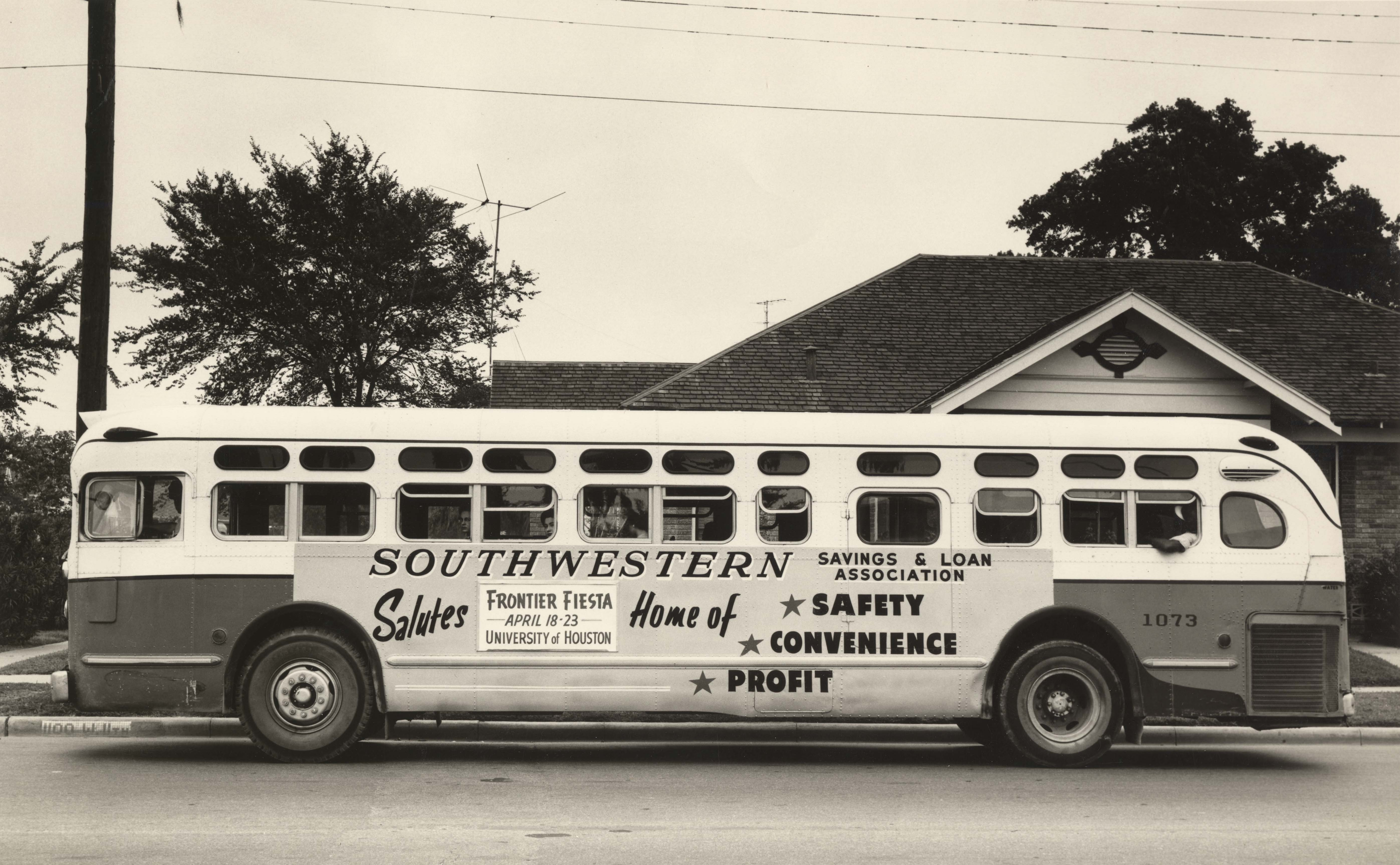
Southwestern Savings & Loan Association bus, Bus with advertisement for Southwestern Savings & Loan Association

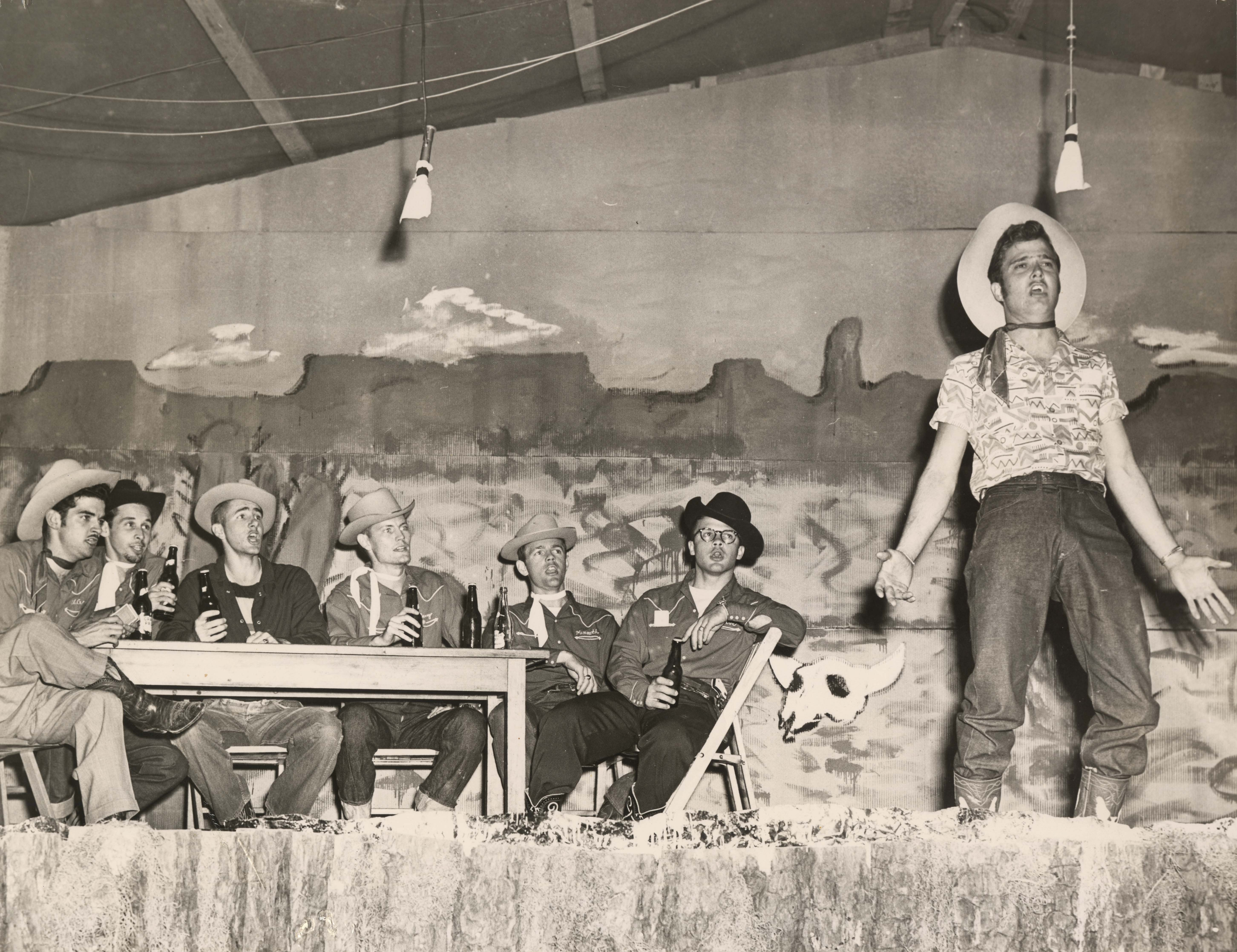
Stage Show

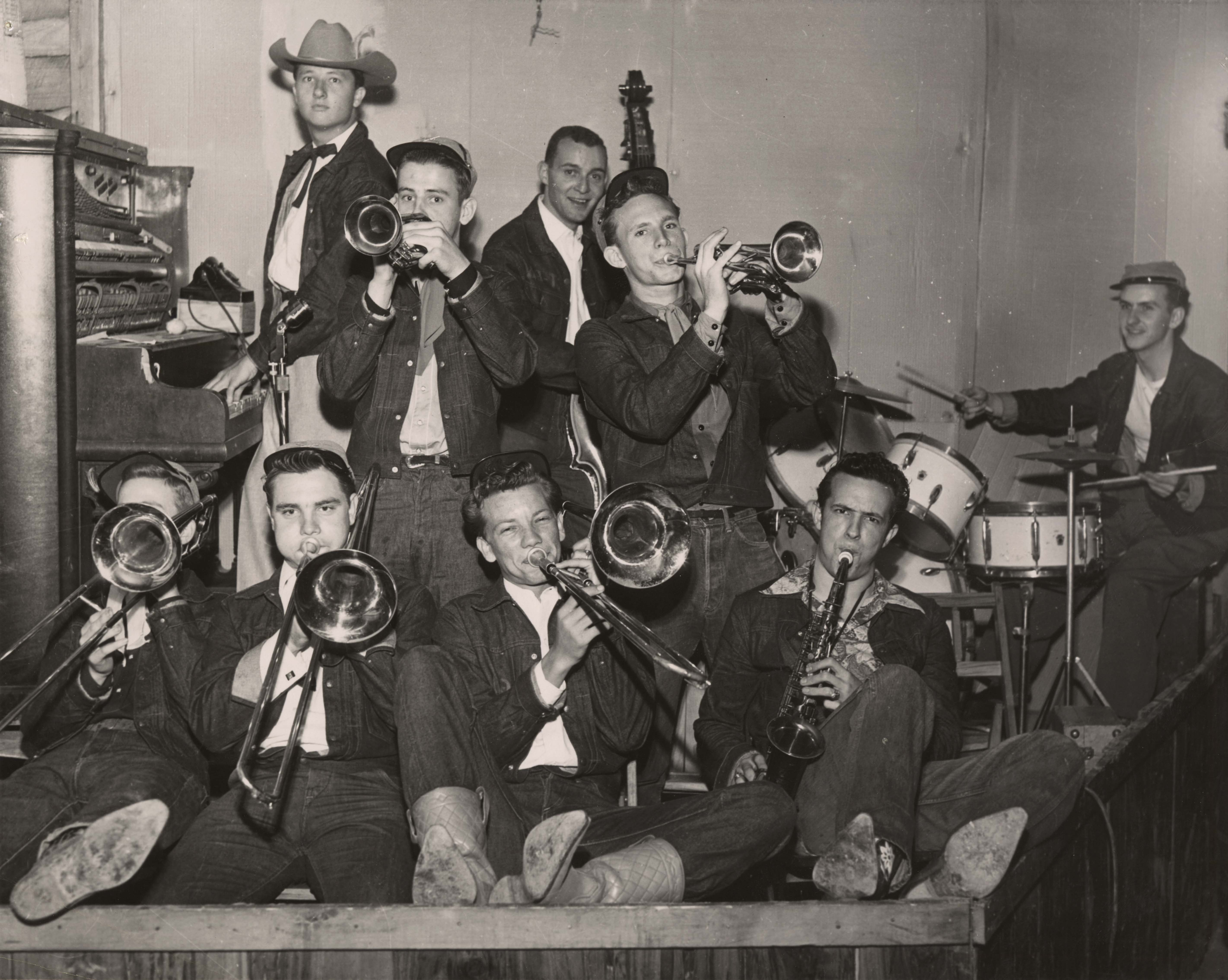
Student Band

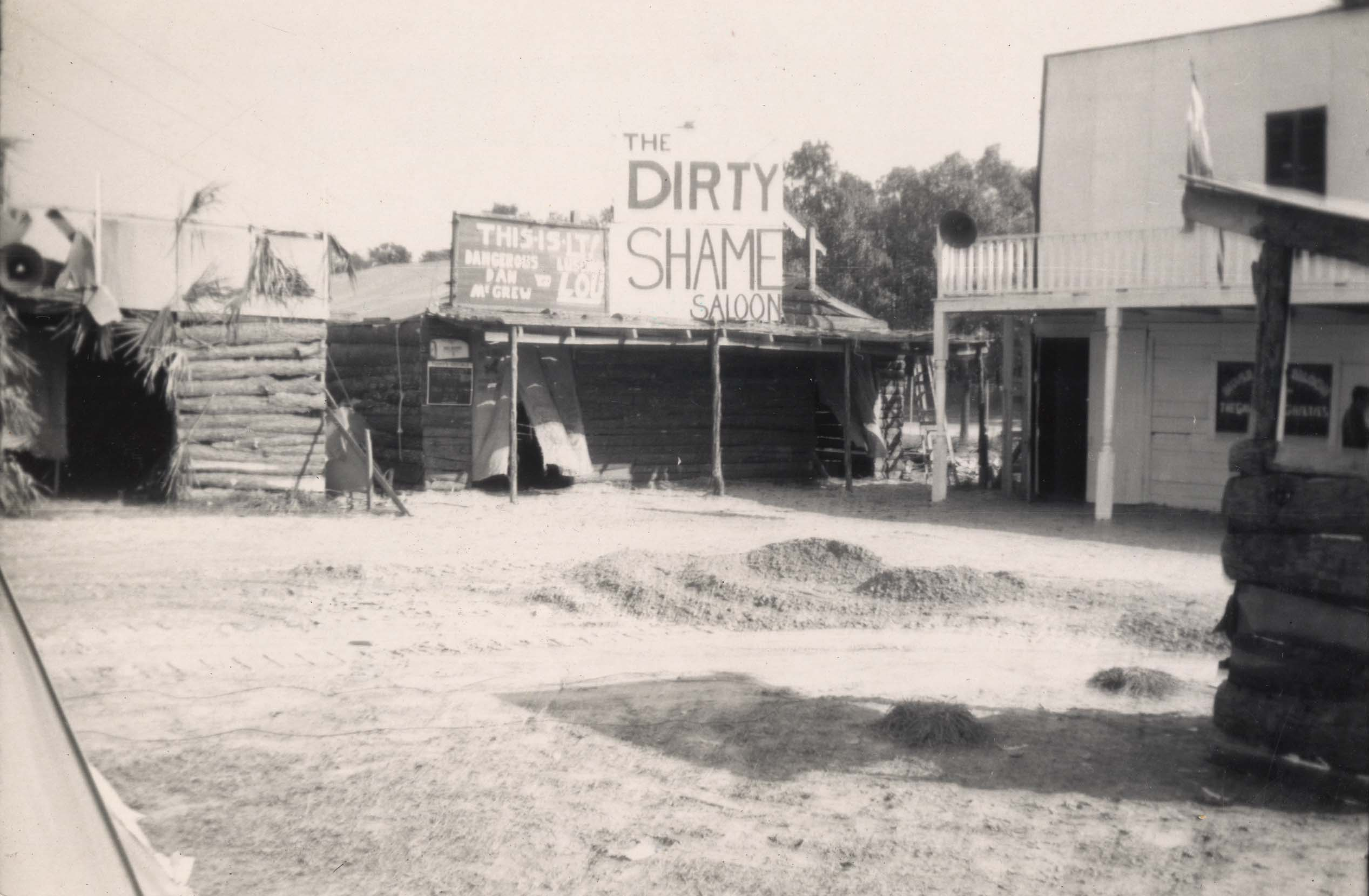
The Dirty Shame Saloon

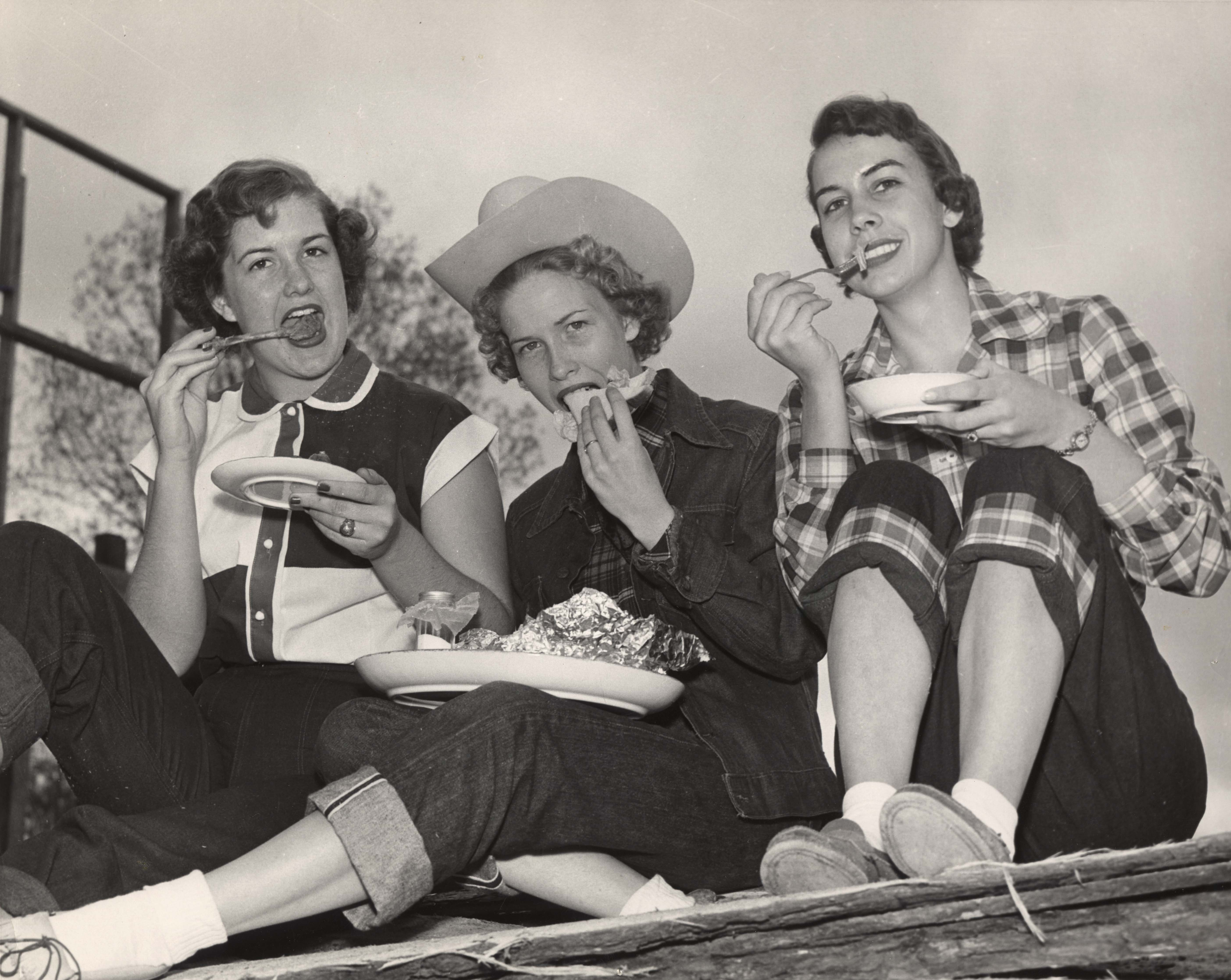
Three students eating

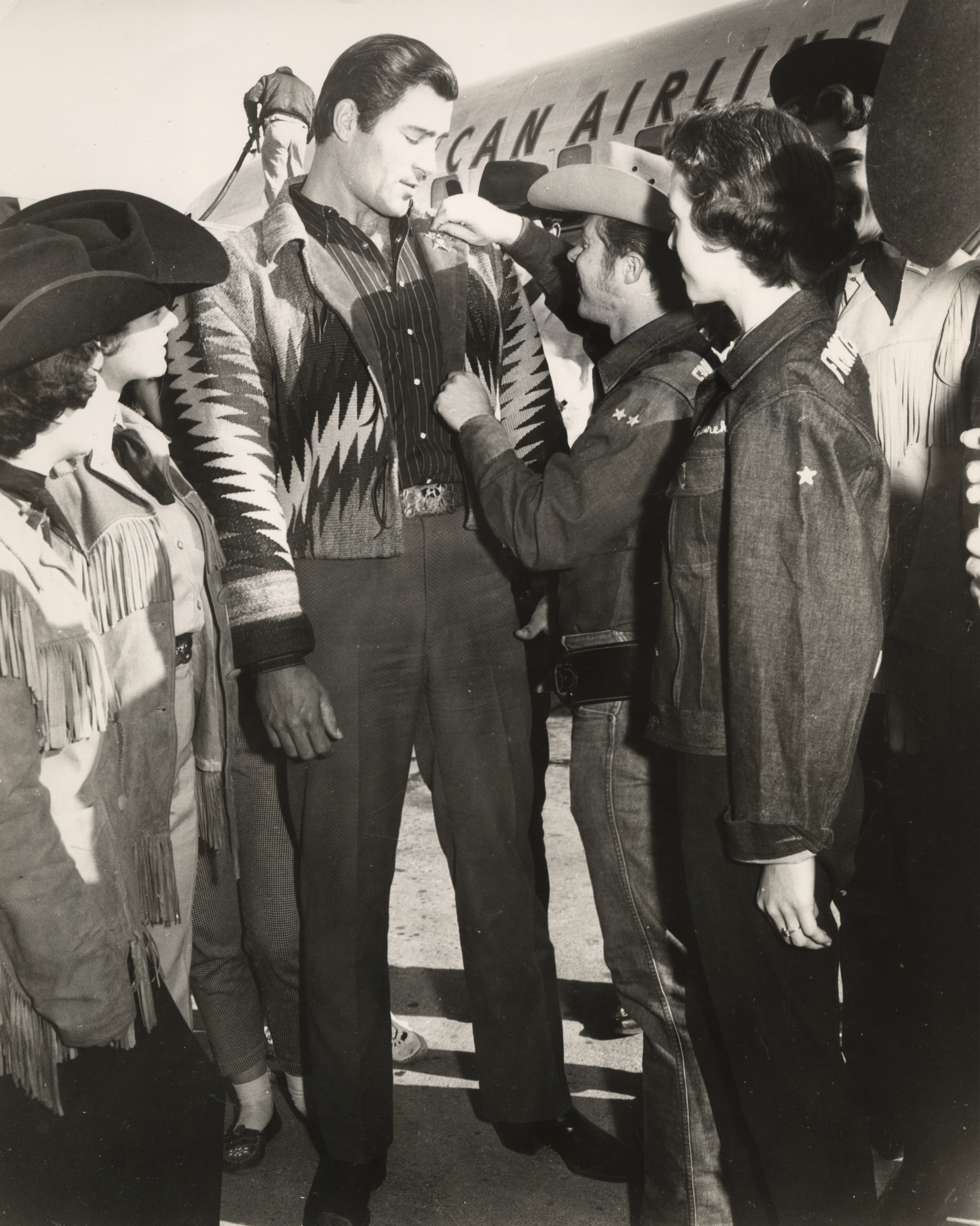
Badge Pinning, Pinning on a Sheriff's badge

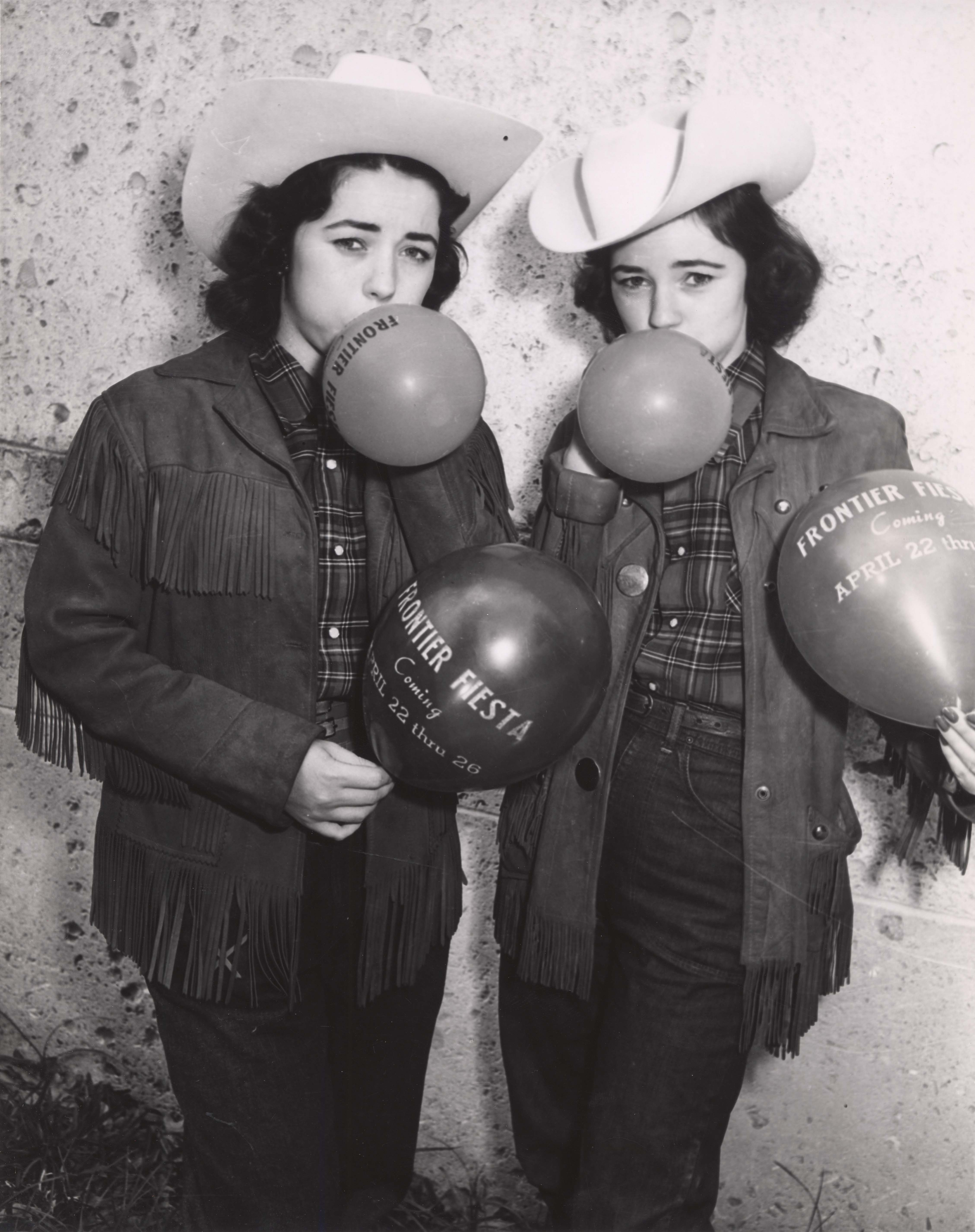
Blowing up balloons, Two female students in costume blowing up balloons
